= Derdas =

Derdas was the name of a series of kings of ancient Elimiotis:

- Derdas I
- Derdas II
- Derdas III
