= Macedonia (Greece) =

Macedonia Μακεδονία
- Geographic region of Greece

Greek transcription(s)
  - Latin: Makedonía
- Flag Emblem
- Anthem: Μακεδονία ξακουστή Makedonía xakoustí ("Famous Macedonia")
- Greek Macedonia (blue)
- Coordinates: 40°45′N 22°54′E
- Country: Greece
- Administrative regions: Central Macedonia; Eastern Macedonia and Thrace (in part); Western Macedonia
- Established: 1913
- Disestablished: 1987 (split)

Area
  - Total: 34,177 km^{2} (13,196 sq mi)
- Highest elevation (Mount Olympus): 2,917 m (9,570 ft)
- Lowest elevation (Sea level): 0 m (0 ft)

Population (2020)
  - Total: 2,366,747
  - Density: 69.250/km^{2} (179.36/sq mi)
- Demonym: Macedonian
- Largest city: Thessaloniki
- The flag, Vergina Sun, and regional anthem are unofficial but their use is widespread.; Eastern Macedonia is part of the region of Eastern Macedonia and Thrace.

Macedonia, (Note: /ˌmæsɪˈdoʊniə/ MASS-ih-DOH-nee-ə; Greek: Μακεδονία, romanized: Makedonía, pronounced [maceðoˈni.a]) also called Greek Macedonia or Makedonia, (Note: /ˌmækɪˈdoʊniə/ MAK-ih-DOH-nee-ə) is a geographic and former administrative region of Greece, in the southern Balkans. Macedonia is the largest and second-most-populous geographic region of Greece, with a population of 2.36 million (as of 2020). Part of Northern Greece, it is highly mountainous, with major urban centres such as Thessaloniki, Katerini and Kavala being concentrated on its southern coastline. Greek Macedonia encompasses entirely the southern part of the wider region of Macedonia, making up 51% of the total area of that region. Additionally, it widely constitutes Greece's borders with three countries: Albania to the northwest, North Macedonia to the north, and Bulgaria to the northeast.

Greek Macedonia incorporates most of the territories of Macedon, a Greek kingdom ruled by the Argeads, whose most celebrated members were Alexander the Great and his father Philip II. Before the expansion of Macedonia under Philip in the 4th century BC, the kingdom of the Macedonians covered an area corresponding roughly to the administrative regions of Western and Central Macedonia in modern Greece. The name Macedonia was later applied to a number of widely-differing administrative areas in the Roman and Byzantine empires. With the gradual conquest of south-eastern Europe by the Ottomans in the late 14th century, the name of Macedonia disappeared as an administrative designation for several centuries and was rarely displayed on maps. With the rise of nationalism in the Ottoman Empire, the name Macedonia was revived in the nineteenth century as a geographical term, and for educated Greeks it corresponded to the ancient historical land. The economic ascent of Thessaloniki and of the other urban centres of Macedonia coincided with the cultural and political renaissance of the Greeks. The leader and coordinator of the Greek Revolution in Macedonia was Emmanouel Pappas, today considered a Greek hero along with the unnamed Macedonians that fought with him.

The fall and massacre of Naoussa marked the end of the Greek Revolution in Macedonia, and the region remained in the Ottoman Empire. In the early 20th century the region was already a national cause, contested among the states of Greece, Bulgaria and Serbia. The southern part of the region of Macedonia became part of the Greek state, in the aftermath of the Balkan Wars and the Treaty of Bucharest (1913). It continued as an administrative division of Greece until the reform of 1987, when it was split into the second-level administrative divisions of Western Macedonia and Central Macedonia; while the eastern part, into the Drama-Kavala-Xanthi Super-prefecture until 2010, and part of the Eastern Macedonia and Thrace division after 2010. The region is further divided between the third-level administrative divisions of the Decentralized Administration of Macedonia and Thrace, and the Decentralized Administration of Epirus and Western Macedonia. It also includes the autonomous monastic community of Mount Athos, which is under the jurisdiction of the Ministry of Foreign Affairs (through the civil administrator of Mount Athos) in its political aspect, and of the Ecumenical Patriarch of Constantinople in its religious aspect.

The region remains an important economic centre for Greece. Macedonia accounts for the majority of Greece's agricultural production and is also a major contributor to the country's industrial and tourism sectors. The metropolis of the region, Thessaloniki is the second-largest city and a major economic, industrial, cultural, commercial and political centre of Greece. Central Macedonia is Greece's fourth-most-popular tourist region and the most popular destination that is not an island. It is home to four UNESCO World Heritage sites, including Aigai (modern-day Vergina, about 12 km (7 mi) from Veria), the first Macedonian capital, where Philip II was assassinated and Alexander the Great was crowned king of Macedon. Pella (about 1 km (0.62 mi) from modern town of Pella and about 7 km (4.3 mi) from Giannitsa), which replaced Aigai as the capital of Macedon in the fourth century BC and was the birthplace of Alexander the Great, is also located in the region. Stagira, which was the birthplace of Aristotle, is also located in the region.

== Etymology ==
The name Macedonia derives from the Greek: Μακεδονία (Makedonía), a kingdom (later, region) named after the ancient Macedonians, who were the descendants of a Bronze-Age Greek tribe. Their name, Μακεδόνες (Makedónes), is cognate to the Ancient Greek adjective μᾰκεδνός (makednós), meaning 'tall, slim'. It is traditionally derived from the Indo-European root *meh₂ḱ-, meaning 'long' or 'slender'. Linguist Robert S. P. Beekes supports the idea that both terms are of Pre-Greek substrate origin and cannot be explained in terms of Indo-European morphology. However, Beekes' views are not mainstream and De Decker argues that his arguments are insufficient. The region has historically also been known as Македония (Makedonija) in Bulgarian and the local South Slavic dialects, Makedonya in Turkish, and Machedonia in Aromanian. Machedonia is also the name for the region in Megleno-Romanian.

The term "Aegean Macedonia" arose after the Balkan Wars in reference to the region. Yugoslavs and Bulgarians have used the term "Aegean Macedonia" instead of "Greek Macedonia". Macedonian textbooks with maps depicting an enlarged Macedonia (including Greek and Bulgarian Macedonia) were used in the Yugoslav period and after North Macedonia's independence in 1991. Ethnic Macedonians have envisioned Greek Macedonia (referred to as "Aegean Macedonia") as part of a "Greater Macedonia". They have circulated maps depicting this concept. Aegean Refugee Associations have also promoted the irredentist concept United Macedonia. It appears that the name "Aegean Macedonia" sometimes challenges the legitimacy of Greek sovereignty over the area. The name has not been recognized in Greece. Macedonian members of the Joint Macedonian–Greek Committee agreed with the removal of the term from textbooks.

== History ==
=== Prehistory ===
Macedonia lies at the crossroads of human development between the Aegean and the Balkans. The earliest signs of human habitation date back to the palaeolithic period, notably with the Petralona cave in which was found the oldest yet known European humanoid, Archanthropus europaeus petraloniensis. The Ouranopithecus macedoniensis is perhaps the oldest, dating to 9.6–8.7 million years ago. During the early Neolithic period, the settlement of Nea Nikomedeia was developed. In the Late Neolithic period (c. 4500 – c. 3500 BC), trade took place with quite distant regions, indicating rapid socio-economic changes. One of the most important innovations was the start of copper working.

=== Early history of Argead Macedonia ===
According to Herodotus, the history of Macedonia began with the tribe of Makednoi, among the first to use the name, migrating to the region from Histiaeotis in the south. There they lived near Thracian tribes and Bryges; the latter would later leave Macedonia for Anatolia and become known as Phrygians. Macedonia was named after Makedon. Accounts of other toponyms such as Emathia are attested to have been in use before that. Herodotus claims that the Macedonians invaded Southern Greece towards the end of the second millennium B.C., and upon reaching the Peloponnese they were renamed Dorians, triggering the accounts of the Dorian invasion. The Makedones claimed to be Dorian Greeks with their Argead kings originating from Argos, Peloponnese. However, N. G. L. Hammond, based on a passage of Hellanicus, as well on the myth of Thessalian Magnes (son of Aeolus) being brother of Makedon, suggested that ancient Macedonian was an Aeolic Greek dialect. For centuries, the tribes of Upper Macedonia were organised in the independent kingdoms of Orestis, Tymphaea, Lynkestis, and Elimiotis. There were also many Ionian colonies in the coastal regions. For centuries, the tribes of Upper Macedonia were organised in the independent kingdoms of Orestis, Tymphaea, Lynkestis, and Elimiotis. In Upper Macedonia, the tribes of Elimiotae, Orestae, Lyncestae, and Pelagones, were all Epirotic tribes and used the Northwest Greek dialect. The Argead Macedonians established the kingdom of Macedon centered around Aigai, in Lower Macedonia, which corresponds roughly to parts of current Central Macedonia.

Most scholars maintain that ancient Macedonian was a Greek dialect, probably of the Northwestern Doric group in particular. The rest of the region was inhabited by various Thracian and Illyrian tribes as well as mostly coastal colonies of other Greek city-states such as Amphipolis, Olynthos, Potidea, Stageira and many others, and to the north another tribe dwelt, called the Paeonians. During the late 6th and early 5th century BC, the region came under Persian rule until the destruction of Xerxes at Plataea.

During the Peloponnesian War, Macedonia became the theatre of many military actions by the Peloponnesian League and the Athenians, and saw incursions of Thracians and Illyrians, as attested by Thucydides. Perdiccas II of Macedon and his son Archelaus allied both to the Athenians and the Spartans several times (both the Spartans and the Macedonians were considered Dorian, while the Athenians Ionian), but Athens maintained the colony of Amphipolis under her control until it was seized by Brasidas.

=== Rise of Macedon under Philip II and Alexander ===
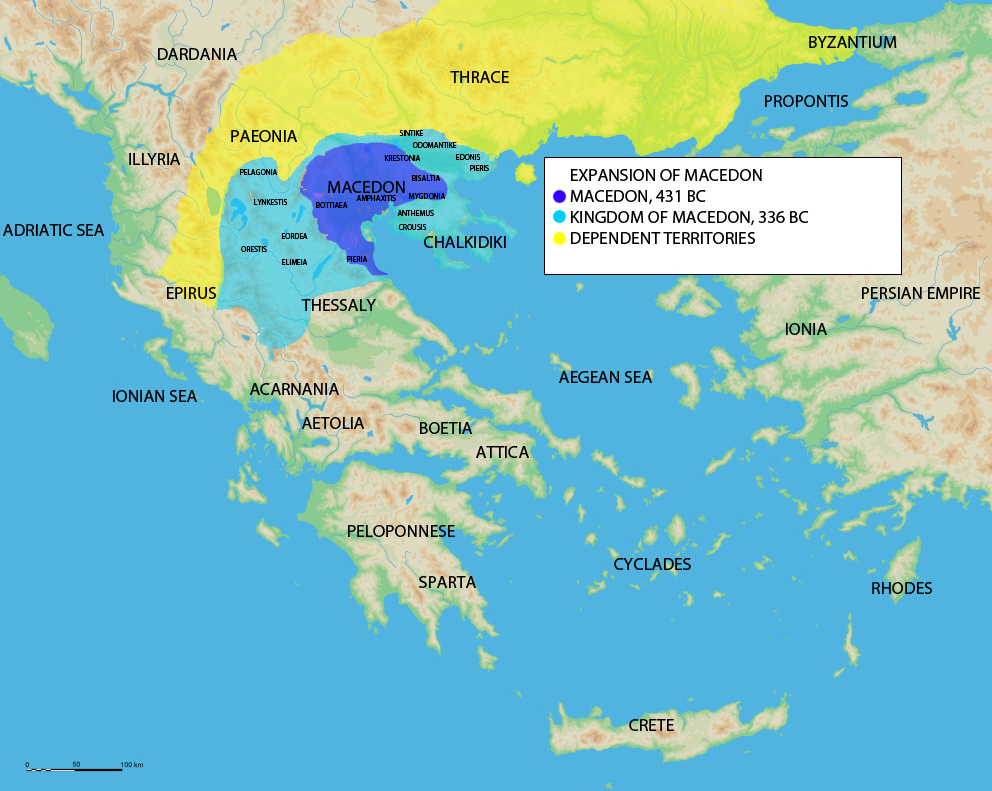
The expansion of the ancient Macedonian Kingdom up to the death of Phillip II

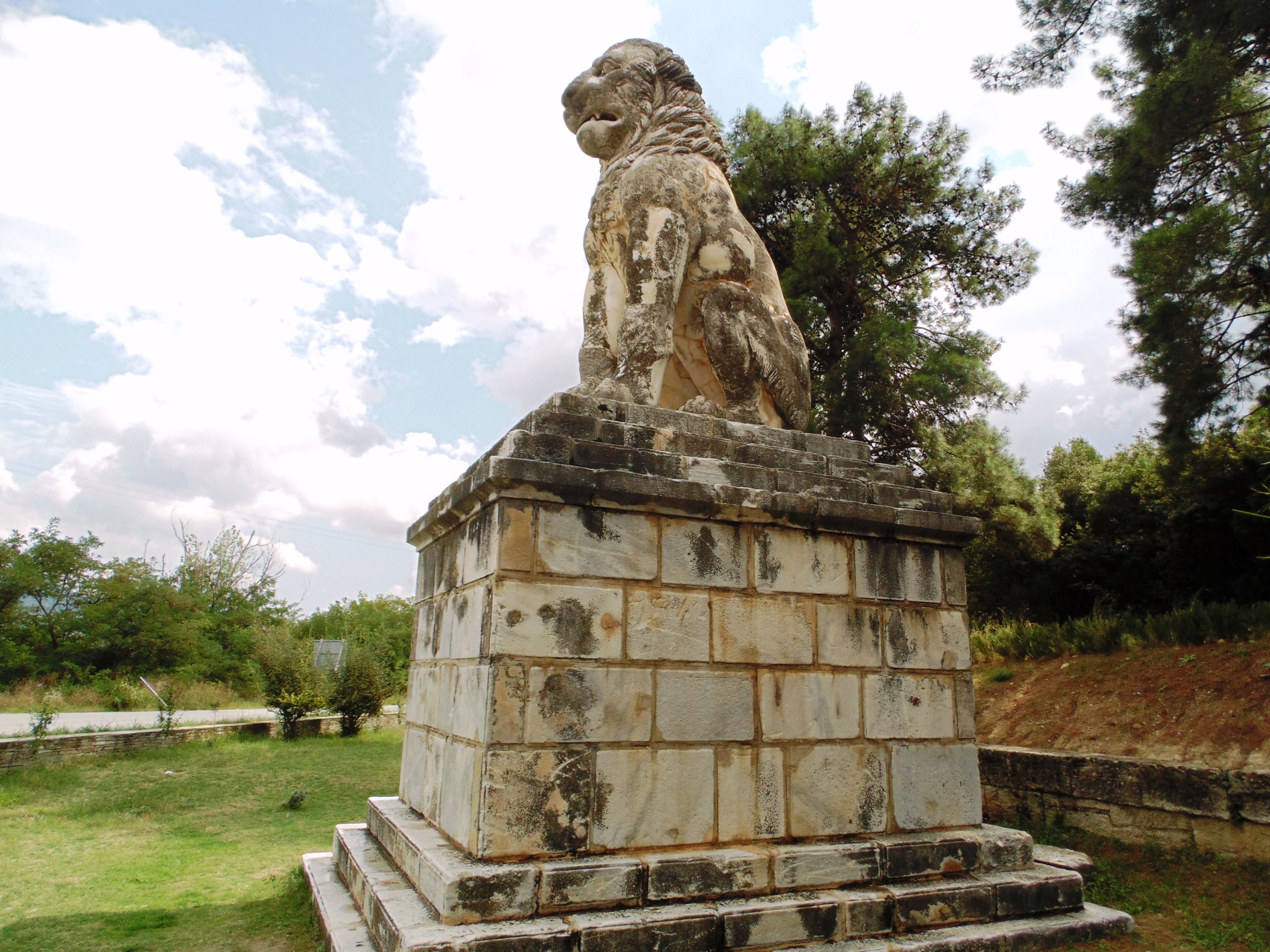
The Lion of Amphipolis; erected in 4th BC in honour of Laomedon of Mytilene, general of Alexander the Great

The kingdom of Macedon with its capital at Pella, was reorganised by Philip II and achieved the union of most of ancient Greece by forming the League of Corinth under his leadership. After his assassination at Aigai, his son Alexander the Great succeeded to the throne of Macedon and carrying the title of Hegemon of the Hellenic League, started his long campaign towards the east against the Achaemenid empire. Before his death at Babylon in 323 BC, his empire stretched from Greece to India.

=== Hellenistic period ===
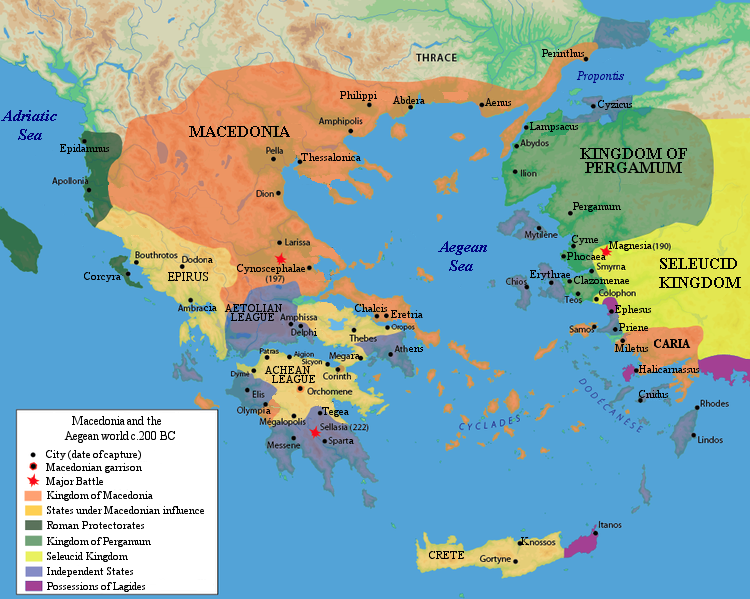
The Kingdom of Macedonia (orange) under Philip V (r. 221–179 BC), with Macedonian dependent states (dark yellow)

After the death of Alexander the Great and the Wars of the Diadochi, Macedonia was a powerful state of Hellenistic Greece. It was ruled by Cassander, son of Antipater, who founded Thessaloniki, named after his wife Thessalonike of Macedon (half-sister of Alexander the Great), and then the throne of Macedon was contested between Lysimachus, Pyrrhus of Epirus, Demetrius Poliorcetes and his son Antigonus Gonatas until 272 BC. A Macedonian League called the "Koinon of the Macedonians" was established. Antigonid Macedon remained an important and powerful state until the end of the Second Macedonian War and the defeat of Philip V by Rome. The Battle of Pydna (22 June 168 BC), in which the Roman general Aemilius Paulus defeated the last Antigonid king Perseus, ended the reign of the Antigonid dynasty over Macedonia. Macedon was divided into four administrative districts by the Romans in the hope that this would make revolts more difficult, but this manoeuvre failed when Andriscus led a revolt.

=== Roman period and early Byzantine period ===
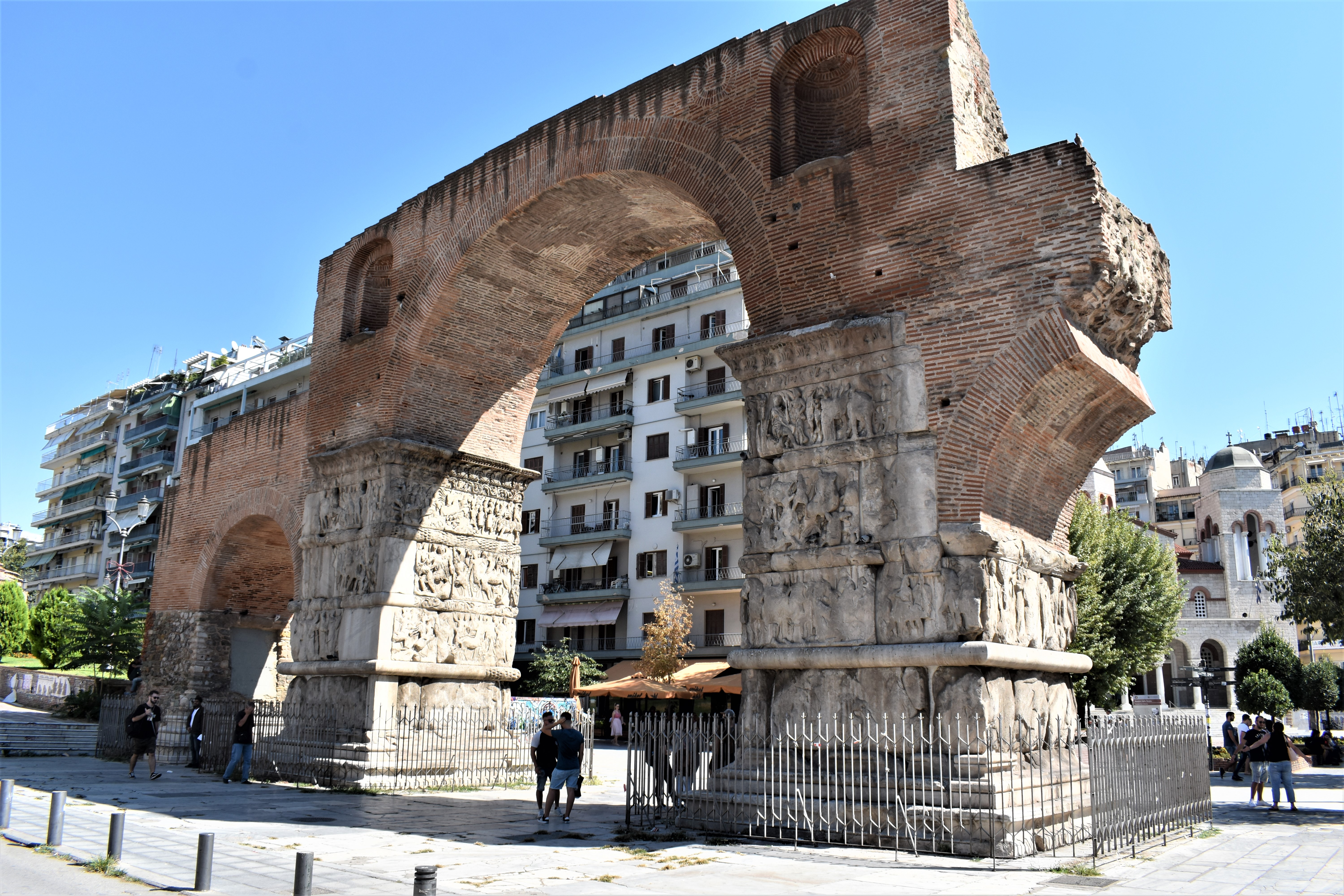
View of the Roman-era Arch of Galerius in Thessaloniki, capital of Roman Macedonia

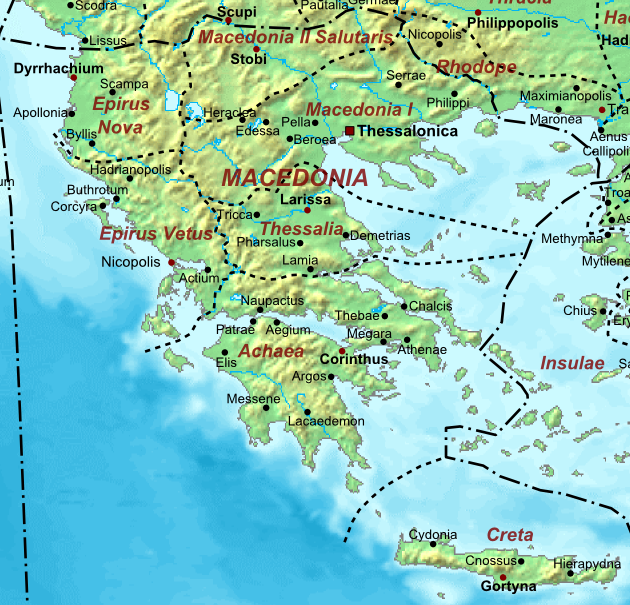
The late Roman Diocese of Macedonia, including the provinces of Macedonia Prima, Macedonia Secunda or Salutaris (periodically abolished), Thessalia, Epirus vetus, Epirus nova, Achaea, and Crete

Then in 148 BC, Macedonia was fully annexed by the Romans. The northern boundary at that time ended at Lake Ohrid and Bylazora, a Paeonian city near the modern city of Veles. Strabo, writing in the first century AD places the border of Macedonia on that part at Lychnidos, Byzantine Achris and presently Ochrid. Therefore, ancient Macedonia did not significantly extend beyond its current borders (in Greece). To the east, Macedonia ended according to Strabo at the river Strymon, although he mentions that other writers placed Macedonia's border with Thrace at the river Nestos, which is also the present geographical boundary between the two administrative districts of Greece. The Acts of the Apostles records a vision in which the apostle Paul is said to have seen a 'man of Macedonia' pleading with him, saying, "Come over to Macedonia and help us".

Subsequently the provinces of Epirus and Thessaly as well as other regions to the north were incorporated into a new Provincia Macedonia, but in 297 AD under a Diocletianic reform many of these regions were removed and two new provinces were created: Macedonia Prima and Macedonia Salutaris (from 479 to 482 AD Macedonia Secunda). Macedonia Prima coincided approximately with Strabo's definition of Macedonia and with the modern administrative district of Greece and had Thessaloniki as its capital, while Macedonia Salutaris had the Paeonian city of Stobi (near Gradsko) as its capital. This subdivision is mentioned in Hierocles' Synecdemon (527–528) and remained through the reign of emperor Justinian.

The Slavic, Avar, Bulgarian and Magyar invasions in the 6–7th centuries devastated both provinces with only parts of Macedonia Prima in the coastal areas and nearer Thrace remaining in Byzantine hands, while most of the hinterland was disputed between the Byzantine Empire and the First Bulgarian Empire. The Macedonian regions under Byzantine control passed under the tourma of Macedonia to the province of Thrace.

=== Medieval history ===
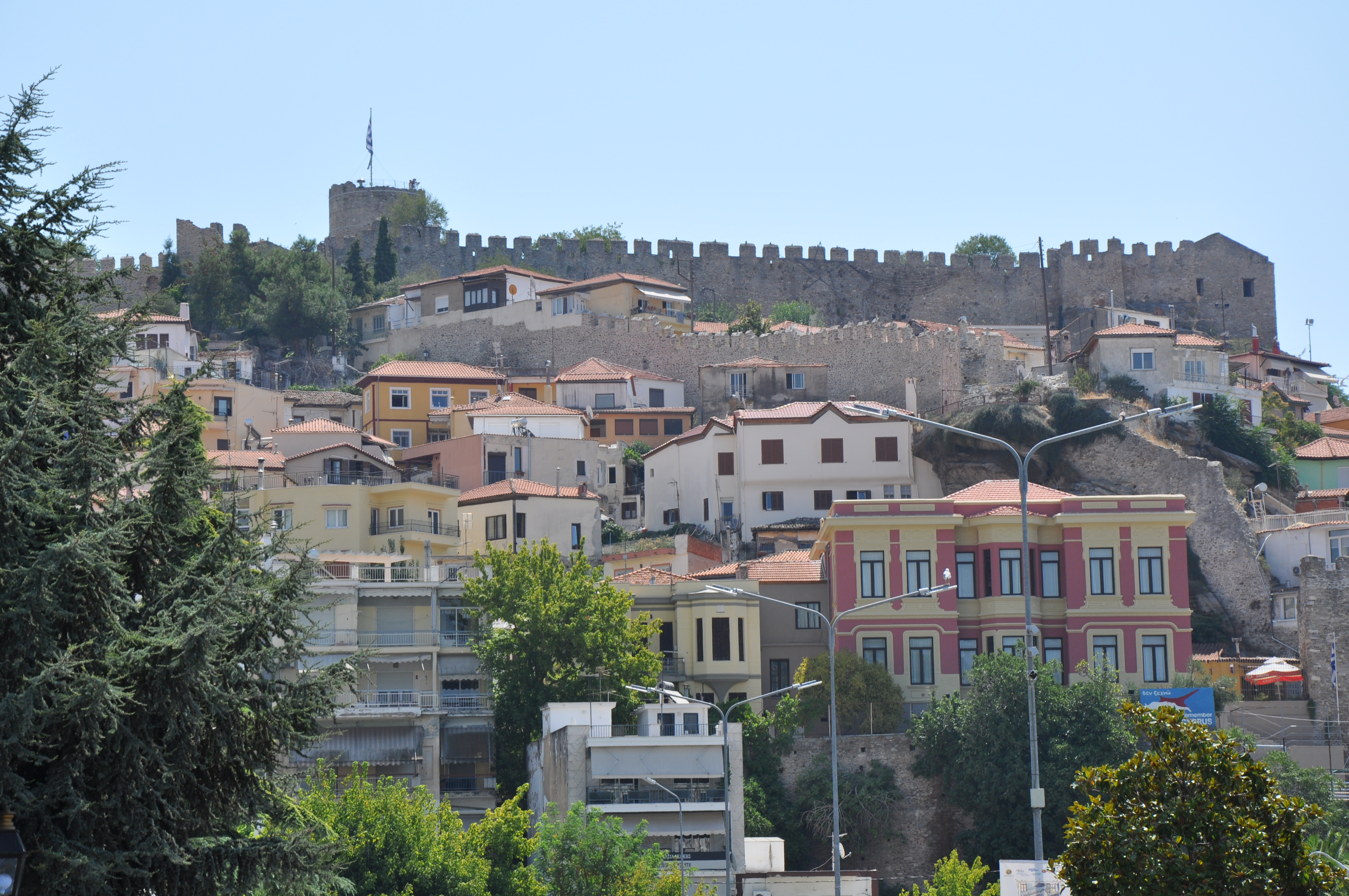
View of the Byzantine fortress in the old town of Kavala

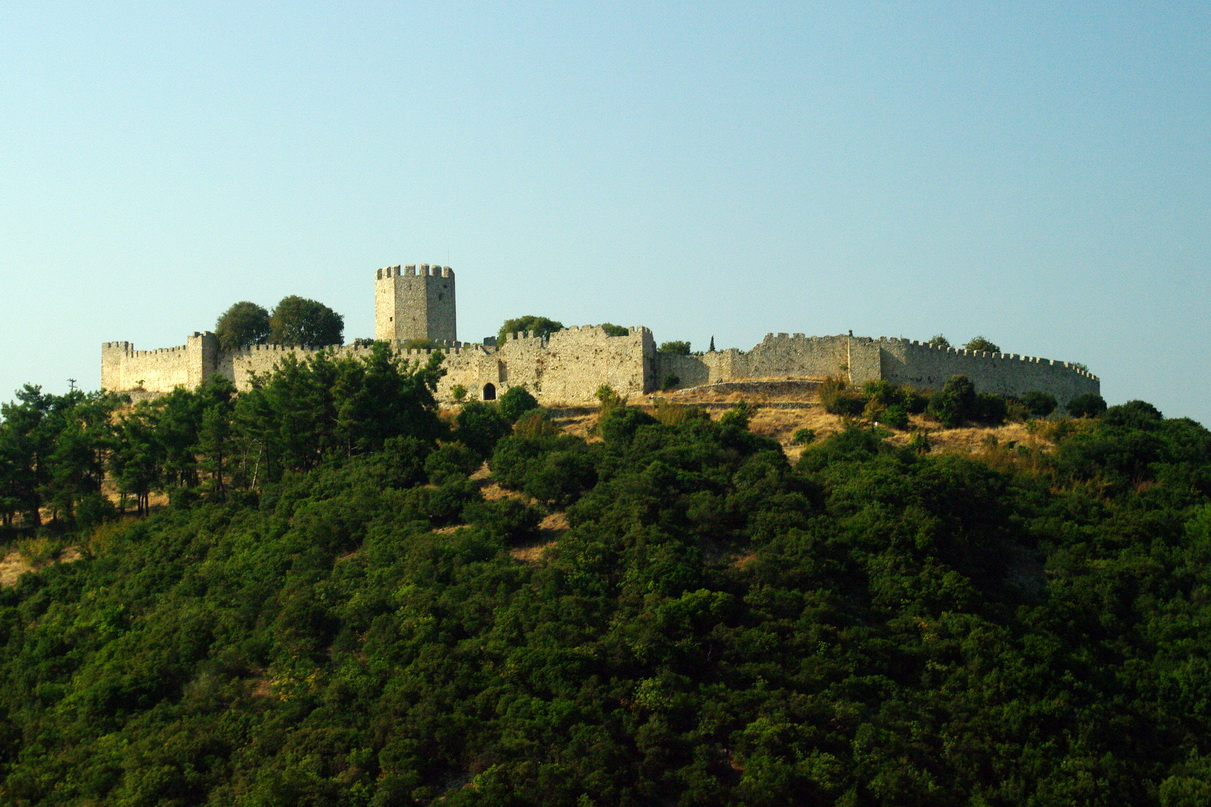
The Frankish Platamon Castle

A new system of administration came into place in 789–802 AD, following the Byzantine Empire's recovery from these invasions. The new system was based on administrative divisions called Themata. The region of Macedonia Prima (the territory of modern Greek administrative district of Macedonia) was divided between the Thema of Thessaloniki and the Thema of Strymon, so that only the region of the area from Nestos eastwards continued to carry the name Macedonia, referred to as the Thema of Macedonia or the Thema of "Macedonia in Thrace". The Thema of Macedonia in Thrace had its capital in Adrianople.

Familiarity with the Slavic element in the area led two brothers from Thessaloniki, Saints Cyril and Methodius, to be chosen to convert the Slavs to Christianity. Following the campaigns of Basil II, all of Macedonia returned to the Byzantine state. Following the Fourth Crusade 1203–1204, a short-lived Crusader realm, the Kingdom of Thessalonica, was established in the region. It was subdued by the co-founder of the Greek Despotate of Epirus, Theodore Komnenos Doukas in 1224, when Greek Macedonia and the city of Thessaloniki were at the heart of the short-lived Empire of Thessalonica. Returning to the restored Byzantine Empire shortly thereafter, Greek Macedonia remained in Byzantine hands until the 1340s, when all of Macedonia (except Thessaloniki, and possibly Veria) was conquered by the Serbian ruler Stefan Dušan. After the Battle of Maritsa (1371), Byzantine rule was reestablished in eastern regions, including Serres. During the 1380s, the region was gradually conquered by the advancing Ottomans, with Serres holding out until 1383, and Thessaloniki until 1387. After a brief Byzantine interval in 1403–1430 (during the last seven years of which the city was handed over to the Venetians), Thessaloniki and its immediate surrounding area returned to the Ottomans.

=== Ottoman rule ===
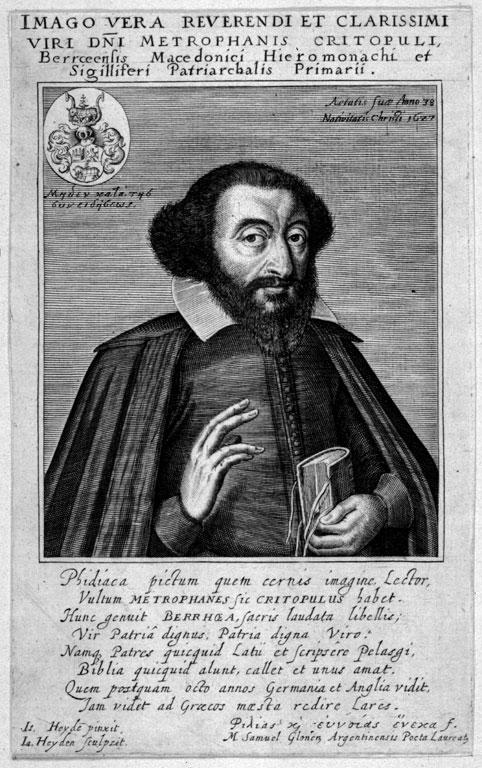
Metrophanes Kritopoulos, theologian, monk and Patriarch of Alexandria who was born in Veria in 1589.

The capture of Thessaloniki in 1430 threw the Byzantine world into consternation, being regarded correctly as a prelude to the fall of Constantinople itself. The memory of the event has survived through folk traditions containing fact and myths. Apostolos Vacalopoulos records the following Turkish tradition connected with the capture of Thessaloniki:

"While Murad was asleep in his palace at Yenitsa, the story has it that, God appeared to him in a dream and gave him a lovely rose to smell, full of perfume. The sultan was so amazed by its beauty that he begged God to give it to him. God replied, "This rose, Murad, is Thessalonica. Know that it is to you granted by heaven to enjoy it. Do not waste time; go and take it". Complying with this exhortation from God, Murad marched against Thessalonica and, as it has been written, captured it."

Thessaloniki became a centre of Ottoman administration in the Balkans. While most of Macedonia was ruled by the Ottomans, in Mount Athos the monastic community continued to exist in a state of autonomy. The remainder of the Chalkidiki peninsula also enjoyed an autonomous status: the "Koinon of Mademochoria" was governed by a locally appointed council due to privileges obtained on account of its wealth, coming from the gold and silver mines in the area.

=== Modern history ===
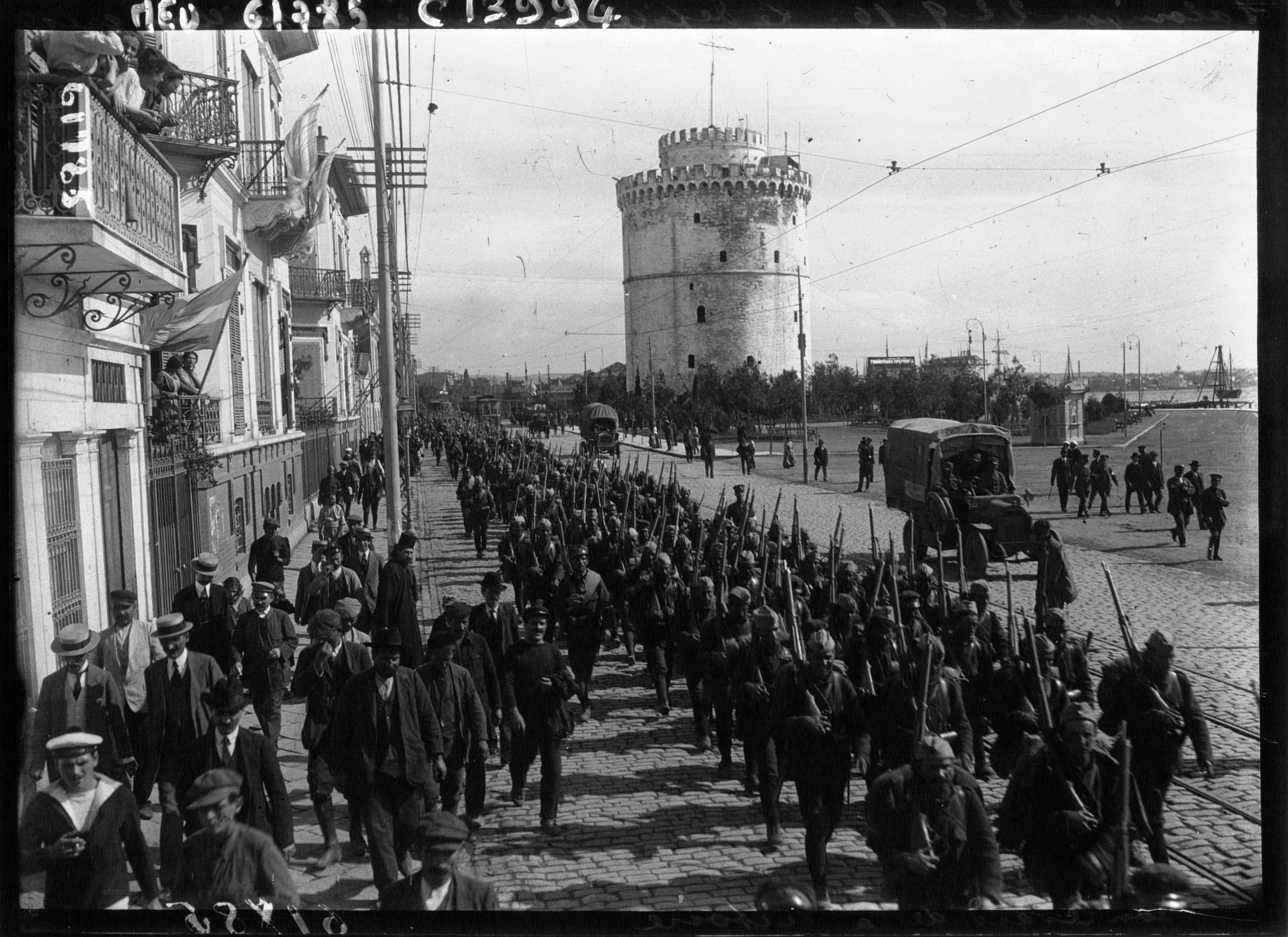
The 1st Battalion of the National Defence marches on its way to the Front, during WWI.

There were several uprisings in Macedonia during Ottoman rule, including an uprising after the Battle of Lepanto that ended in massacres of the Greek population, the uprising in Naousa of the armatolos Zisis Karademos in 1705, a rebellion in the area of Grevena by a Klepht called Ziakas (1730–1810). The Greek Declaration of Independence in Macedonia by Emmanuel Pappas in 1821, during the Greek War of Independence. The revolt spread from Central to Western Macedonia. In the autumn of 1821, Nikolaos Kasomoulis was sent to southern Greece as the "representative of South-East Macedonia", and met Demetrius Ypsilantis. At the beginning of 1822, Anastasios Karatasos and Angelis Gatsos arranged a meeting with other armatoloi and decided that the insurrection should be based on three towns: Naoussa, Kastania, and Siatista. In 1854 Theodoros Ziakas, the son of the klepht Ziakas, together with Dimitrios Karatasos, who had been among the captains at the siege of Naousa in 1821, led another uprising in Western Macedonia that has been profusely commemorated in Greek folk song.

To strengthen Greek efforts for Macedonia, the Hellenic Macedonian Committee was formed in 1903, under the leadership of Dimitrios Kalapothakis; its members included Ion Dragoumis and Pavlos Melas. Its fighters were known as Makedonomachoi ("Macedonian fighters"). Greece helped the Macedonians to resist both Ottoman and Bulgarian forces, by sending military officers who formed bands made up of Macedonians and other Greek volunteers, something that resulted in the Macedonian Struggle from 1904 to 1908, which ended with the Young Turk Revolution. The Macedonians fought alongside the regular Greek army during the struggle for Macedonia. There are monuments in Macedonia commemorating the Makedonomachoi, the local Macedonian and other Greek fighters, who took part in the wars and died to liberate Macedonia from the Ottoman rule, officially memorialized as heroes.

Greece gained the southern parts of the region (with Thessaloniki), which corresponded to that of ancient Macedonia attributed as part of Greek history and had a strong Greek presence, from the Ottoman Empire after the First Balkan War, and expanded its share in the Second Balkan War against Bulgaria. The boundaries of Greek Macedonia were finalised in the Treaty of Bucharest. In World War I, Macedonia became a battlefield. The Greek Prime Minister, Eleftherios Venizelos, favoured entering the war on the side of the Entente, while the Germanophile King Constantine I favoured neutrality. Invited by Venizelos, in autumn 1915, the Allies landed forces in Thessaloniki to aid Serbia in its war against Austria-Hungary and Bulgaria, but their intervention came too late to prevent the Serbian collapse. The Macedonian front was established, with Thessaloniki at its heart, while in summer 1916 the Bulgarians took over Greek eastern Macedonia without opposition. This provoked a military uprising among pro-Venizelist officers in Thessaloniki, resulting in the establishment of a "Provisional Government of National Defence" in the city, headed by Venizelos, which entered the war alongside the Allies. After intense diplomatic negotiations and an armed confrontation in Athens between Entente and royalist forces the King abdicated, and his second son Alexander took his place. Venizelos returned to Athens in June 1917 and Greece, now unified, officially joined the war on the side of the Allies.

In World War II Macedonia was occupied by the Axis (1941–44), with Germany taking western and central Macedonia with Thessaloniki and Bulgaria occupying and annexing eastern Macedonia.

At the beginning of the 19th century, Slavic peasants identified themselves based on belonging to their family, village, or local region, or as "Rum Millet", i.e. members of the Greek-dominated community of Orthodox Christians. The Slavs of Macedonia generally referred to themselves and were known as "Bulgarians". By the middle of the 19th century, peasant communities of Macedonia experienced the formation of deep divisions with rise of nationalism in the Ottoman Empire. From then, the Slavic speaking communities of northern Greece split into two hostile and opposed groups with two different national identities – Greek and Bulgarian. However, clear national consciousness existed mostly among a small educated class of the population, i.e. intelligentsia, revolutionaries and clergy, while on the other hand the peasantry was not involved in national debates. Thus, as seen by observers, the affiliation of Macedonian Slavs to different national camps was not indeed belonging to an ethnic group, but rather political and flexible option. By the Second World War and following the defeat of Bulgaria, another further split between the Slavic groups occurred. Conservatives departed with the occupying Bulgarian Army to Bulgaria. Leftists who identified as Macedonians (Slavic), joined the KKE-led Democratic Army of Greece during the Greek Civil War. At the conclusion of the Civil War (1946–49), most Macedonians of Slavic background followed other DSE forces who fled to the Yugoslav Socialist Republic of Macedonia and other countries in Eastern and Central Europe. Some also immigrated to Canada, Australia, and the United States. Current Greek law still forbids the reentry and restitution of property by Macedonians that are not "Greek by origin."

== Geography ==
Macedonia is the largest and second-most-populous Greek region after Roumeli. The landscape is characterized by variety, since Western and Eastern Macedonia is mountainous with the exception of some fertile valleys, while the Thessaloniki-Giannitsa plain, the largest in Greece, is located in Central Macedonia. Mount Olympus, the highest mountain in Greece, is located in the Olympus Range on the border between Thessaly and Macedonia, between the regional units of Pieria and Larissa, about 80 km (50 mi) southwest from Thessaloniki. Some other mountain ranges are Vermio Mountains, Pierian Mountains, Voras Mountains. The islands of Macedonia are Thasos, opposite the coasts of Eastern Macedonia and the port of Kavala, and Ammouliani, opposite the coasts of Central Macedonia, in Chalkidiki. Haliacmon, which flows through Kastoria, Grevena, Kozani, Imathia and Pieria regional units, is the longest river in Greece. Some other rivers are Axios (Vardar), Strymonas, Loudias.

=== Climate ===
Macedonia for the most part enjoys a Mediterranean climate (Köppen: Csa). Some parts have a humid subtropical climate (Cfa), while higher elevations border a humid continental climate (Dfa). Thessaloniki has a cold semi-arid climate (BSk) while downtown Thessaloniki and Neos Marmaras are the only areas of Macedonia with a hot semi-arid climate (Köppen climate classification: BSh). The coldest winters are found in Florina, while the mildest are found in Neos Marmaras and Great Lavra, which fall in hardiness zone 10a.

Climate data for Aristotle University of Thessaloniki 32 m asl, 1991–2020 normals (extremes 1930–present)
Month	Jan	Feb	Mar	Apr	May	Jun	Jul	Aug	Sep	Oct	Nov	Dec	Year
Record high °C (°F)	22.5 (72.5)	25.1 (77.2)	30.1 (86.2)	32.2 (90.0)	37.8 (100.0)	41.2 (106.2)	43.3 (109.9)	41.6 (106.9)	40.3 (104.5)	33.4 (92.1)	28.1 (82.6)	24.4 (75.9)	43.3 (109.9)
Mean daily maximum °C (°F)	10.6 (51.1)	12.4 (54.3)	15.6 (60.1)	19.7 (67.5)	25.2 (77.4)	30.0 (86.0)	32.3 (90.1)	32.3 (90.1)	27.8 (82.0)	22.1 (71.8)	16.6 (61.9)	11.8 (53.2)	21.4 (70.5)
Daily mean °C (°F)	7.0 (44.6)	8.4 (47.1)	11.2 (52.2)	14.9 (58.8)	20.0 (68.0)	24.7 (76.5)	27.0 (80.6)	27.1 (80.8)	22.7 (72.9)	17.7 (63.9)	12.8 (55.0)	8.3 (46.9)	16.8 (62.3)
Mean daily minimum °C (°F)	3.4 (38.1)	4.4 (39.9)	6.8 (44.2)	10.1 (50.2)	14.9 (58.8)	19.4 (66.9)	21.8 (71.2)	21.9 (71.4)	17.6 (63.7)	13.4 (56.1)	9.0 (48.2)	4.9 (40.8)	12.3 (54.1)
Record low °C (°F)	−12.6 (9.3)	−8.9 (16.0)	−8.2 (17.2)	−0.4 (31.3)	5.2 (41.4)	8.6 (47.5)	12.0 (53.6)	10.3 (50.5)	7.7 (45.9)	1.4 (34.5)	−2.8 (27.0)	−8.2 (17.2)	−12.6 (9.3)
Average precipitation mm (inches)	34.1 (1.34)	33.6 (1.32)	39.5 (1.56)	37.5 (1.48)	51.0 (2.01)	31.6 (1.24)	27.0 (1.06)	25.1 (0.99)	37.4 (1.47)	43.7 (1.72)	40.9 (1.61)	48.2 (1.90)	449.6 (17.7)
Source: Aristotle University of Thessaloniki, World Meteorological Organization

Climate data for Florina (1961–2010)
Month	Jan	Feb	Mar	Apr	May	Jun	Jul	Aug	Sep	Oct	Nov	Dec	Year
Record high °C (°F)	18.0 (64.4)	23.0 (73.4)	25.8 (78.4)	31.2 (88.2)	33.8 (92.8)	39.0 (102.2)	40.8 (105.4)	38.6 (101.5)	36.0 (96.8)	32.2 (90.0)	26.6 (79.9)	21.0 (69.8)	40.8 (105.4)
Mean daily maximum °C (°F)	4.7 (40.5)	7.4 (45.3)	12.0 (53.6)	16.8 (62.2)	22.0 (71.6)	26.4 (79.5)	29.0 (84.2)	29.0 (84.2)	24.7 (76.5)	19.0 (66.2)	12.2 (54.0)	5.9 (42.6)	17.4 (63.4)
Daily mean °C (°F)	0.6 (33.1)	2.8 (37.0)	7.0 (44.6)	11.7 (53.1)	16.9 (62.4)	21.1 (70.0)	23.4 (74.1)	22.8 (73.0)	18.2 (64.8)	12.9 (55.2)	7.2 (45.0)	2.0 (35.6)	12.2 (54.0)
Mean daily minimum °C (°F)	−3.1 (26.4)	−1.7 (28.9)	1.5 (34.7)	5.4 (41.7)	9.5 (49.1)	12.8 (55.0)	14.8 (58.6)	14.7 (58.5)	11.4 (52.5)	7.1 (44.8)	2.6 (36.7)	−1.8 (28.8)	6.1 (43.0)
Record low °C (°F)	−25.1 (−13.2)	−23.0 (−9.4)	−13.6 (7.5)	−5.0 (23.0)	0.0 (32.0)	2.4 (36.3)	6.6 (43.9)	4.0 (39.2)	−1.4 (29.5)	−5.0 (23.0)	−12.6 (9.3)	−18.6 (−1.5)	−25.1 (−13.2)
Average precipitation mm (inches)	56.8 (2.24)	51.1 (2.01)	57.8 (2.28)	60.4 (2.38)	59.4 (2.34)	37.3 (1.47)	33.9 (1.33)	30.6 (1.20)	50.1 (1.97)	69.2 (2.72)	71.3 (2.81)	85.6 (3.37)	663.5 (26.12)
Average precipitation days	11.0	10.6	11.1	10.6	10.7	7.2	5.5	5.3	6.5	7.6	9.7	11.8	107.6
Average snowy days	7.5	6.3	4.5	0.8	0.0	0.0	0.0	0.0	0.0	0.3	1.8	5.9	27.1
Average relative humidity (%)	81.2	76.4	68.8	63.2	62.8	58.6	55.4	56.9	63.3	71.4	77.8	81.7	68.1
Source: Hellenic National Meteorological Service

Climate data for Neos Marmaras 6 m a.s.l.
Month	Jan	Feb	Mar	Apr	May	Jun	Jul	Aug	Sep	Oct	Nov	Dec	Year
Record high °C (°F)	20.7 (69.3)	22.8 (73.0)	22.8 (73.0)	26.5 (79.7)	32.4 (90.3)	36.4 (97.5)	39.9 (103.8)	41.6 (106.9)	37.0 (98.6)	29.3 (84.7)	26.1 (79.0)	19.8 (67.6)	41.6 (106.9)
Mean daily maximum °C (°F)	12.3 (54.1)	14.1 (57.4)	15.6 (60.1)	19.5 (67.1)	24.3 (75.7)	29.3 (84.7)	32.1 (89.8)	32.5 (90.5)	27.9 (82.2)	22.5 (72.5)	18.0 (64.4)	14.0 (57.2)	21.8 (71.3)
Daily mean °C (°F)	9.5 (49.1)	11.0 (51.8)	12.2 (54.0)	15.4 (59.7)	20.0 (68.0)	24.9 (76.8)	27.7 (81.9)	28.7 (83.7)	24.0 (75.2)	19.1 (66.4)	15.0 (59.0)	11.3 (52.3)	18.2 (64.8)
Mean daily minimum °C (°F)	6.7 (44.1)	7.9 (46.2)	8.7 (47.7)	11.3 (52.3)	15.6 (60.1)	20.5 (68.9)	23.2 (73.8)	23.6 (74.5)	20.1 (68.2)	15.7 (60.3)	12.1 (53.8)	8.6 (47.5)	14.5 (58.1)
Record low °C (°F)	−4.2 (24.4)	−0.5 (31.1)	0.6 (33.1)	4.2 (39.6)	10.5 (50.9)	13.1 (55.6)	16.3 (61.3)	18.6 (65.5)	13.2 (55.8)	9.9 (49.8)	3.7 (38.7)	−0.6 (30.9)	−4.2 (24.4)
Average rainfall mm (inches)	58.5 (2.30)	28.9 (1.14)	50.1 (1.97)	27.4 (1.08)	21.7 (0.85)	33.9 (1.33)	28.0 (1.10)	11.6 (0.46)	29.0 (1.14)	33.6 (1.32)	43.3 (1.70)	74.1 (2.92)	440.1 (17.31)
Source: National Observatory of Athens (Feb 2014 – Jan 2025), Neos Marmaras N.O.A station and World Meteorological Organization

== Regions and local government ==
Topographic map of Macedonia

Köppen climate classification map of Macedonia

Since 1987 Macedonia has been divided into three regions (Greek: περιφέρειες). These are Western Macedonia, Central Macedonia, and Eastern Macedonia, which is part of the region of Eastern Macedonia and Thrace. These three regions are subdivided into 14 regional units (περιφερειακές ενότητες) which are in turn further divided into municipalities (δήμοι – roughly equivalent to British shires or American Townships). They are overseen by the Ministry for the Interior, while the Deputy Minister for Macedonia and Thrace is responsible for the coordination and application of the government's policies in all three Macedonian regions. Prior to 1987 Macedonia was a single administrative and geographical unit.

The heads of the various administrative units are elected. The last Greek local elections were in 2014, and saw Apostolos Tzitzikostas elected regional governor of Central Macedonia, Giorgos Pavlidis in Eastern Macedonia and Thrace, and Theodoros Karypidis in Western Macedonia. Tzitzikostas and Pavlidis are members of the centre-right New Democracy party, while Karypidis is an independent. Elections take place in a two-round system, where the two candidates with the most votes face each other in a second round if no one has managed to get a majority of more than 50% of the votes in the first round. Regional councils, mayors, and other officials are also elected in this way. The next local elections will take place in 2019. The Deputy Minister for Macedonia and Thrace is not an elected position, and is instead appointed at the pleasure of the Prime Minister of Greece. The current Deputy Minister in the Cabinet of Kyriakos Mitsotakis is Konstantinos Gioulekas of New Democracy. The various regions of Greece are also constituencies to the Hellenic Parliament, and Macedonia is represented through its 66 members of parliament. Thessaloniki is split into two constituencies, Thessaloniki A and Thessaloniki B, while Grevena is the smallest constituency with only 1 seat. Thessaloniki A is the second-largest constituency in Greece with 16 MPs.

Macedonia is bordered by the neighbouring Greek regions of Thessaly to the south, Thrace (part of Eastern Macedonia and Thrace) to the east, and Epirus to the west. It also includes the autonomous monastic community of Mount Athos, which has existed as a religious sanctuary since the Middle Ages. The community of the mount Athos is under the ecclesiastical jurisdiction of the Ecumenical Patriarchate of Constantinople and is inaccessible to women, punishable by a penalty of incarceration of up to twelve months. This has been criticised by the European Parliament. The territory of Mount Athos is a self-governing part of Greece, and the powers of the state are exercised through a governor appointed by the Ministry of Foreign Affairs. The European Union takes this special status into consideration, particularly on matters of taxation exemption and rights of installation. Macedonia borders the sovereign states of Albania to the north-west, North Macedonia to the north, and Bulgaria to the north-east. The table below is a concise list of the various subdivisions of Macedonia:

Map of Macedonia	Subdivisions as of 2011	Capital	Area	Population
	West Macedonia	Kozani	9,451 km^{2}	283,689
	1. Kastoria	Kastoria	1,720 km^{2}	50,322
	2. Florina	Florina	1,924 km^{2}	51,414
	3. Kozani	Kozani	3,516 km^{2}	150,196
	4. Grevena	Grevena	2,291 km^{2}	31,757
	Central Macedonia	Thessaloniki	18,811 km^{2}	1,882,108
	5. Pella	Edessa	2,506 km^{2}	139,680
	6. Imathia	Veria	1,701 km^{2}	140,611
	7. Pieria	Katerini	1,516 km^{2}	126,698
	8. Kilkis	Kilkis	2,519 km^{2}	80,419
	9. Thessaloniki	Thessaloniki	3,683 km^{2}	1,110,551
	10. Chalkidiki	Polygyros	2,918 km^{2}	105,908
	11. Serres	Serres	3.968 km^{2}	176,430
	East Macedonia (Part of East Macedonia and Thrace)	Kavala	5,579 km^{2}	238,785
	12. Drama	Drama	3,468 km^{2}	98,287
	13. Kavala	Kavala	1,728 km^{2}	124,917
	14. Thasos	Thasos	379 km^{2}	13,770
	15. Mount Athos (autonomous)	Karyes	336 km^{2}	1,811
	Macedonia (total)	Thessaloniki	34,177 km^{2}	2,406,393

== Economy and transport ==
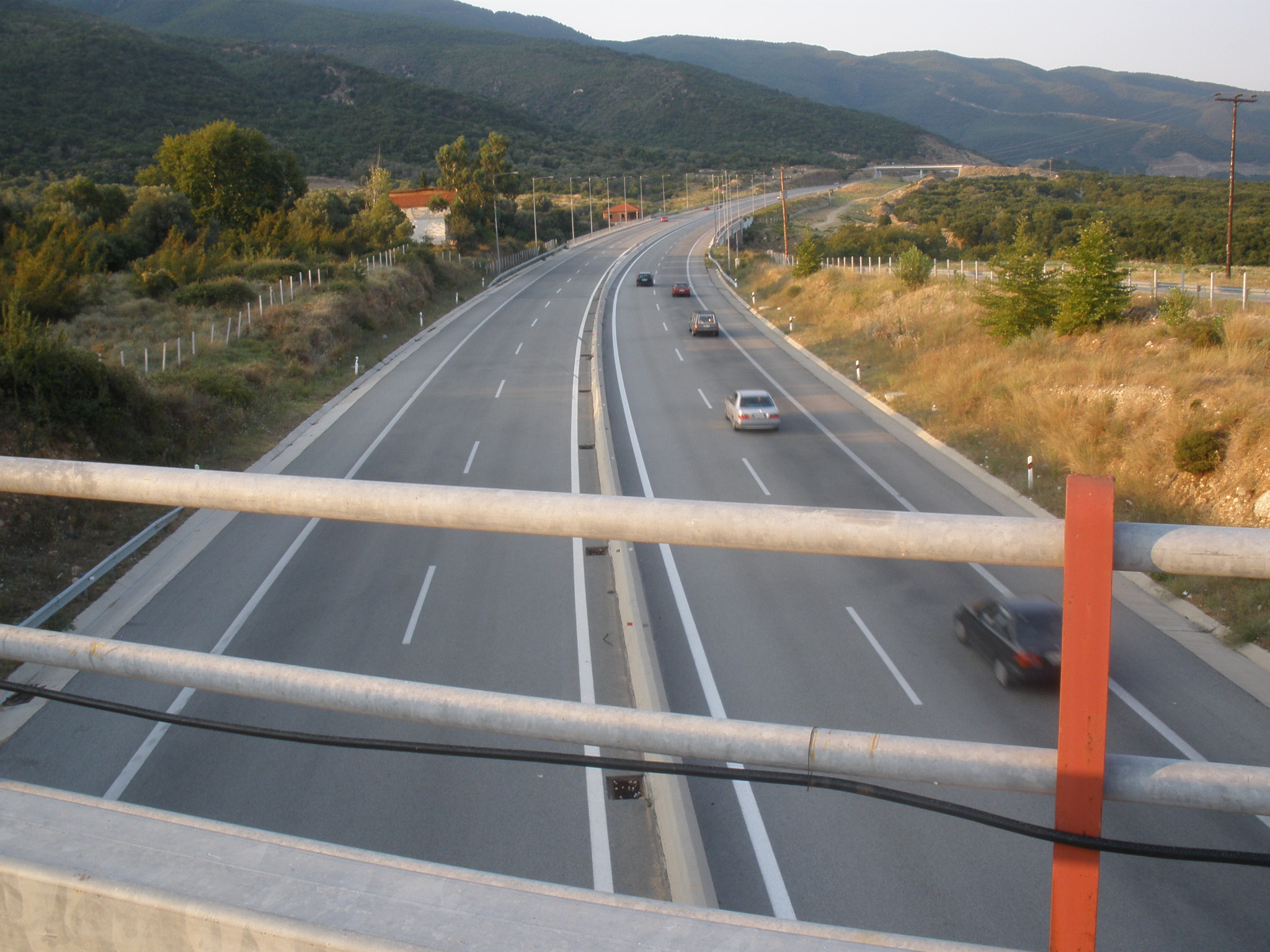
View of the A2 motorway (Egnatia Odos)

The gross domestic product of Macedonia peaked at €41.99 billion ($47.44 billion) in nominal value and €46.87 billion ($52.95 billion) in purchasing power parity just before the Great Recession in 2008; it has since then contracted to its lowest point in 2015, during the Greek government-debt crisis, to €30.85 billion ($34.85 billion) and €38.17 billion ($43.12 billion); a decrease of 26.5%. Greece exited its recession, which began in 2009, in 2016 but data from that year onward is not available for the whole of Macedonia; Central Macedonia grew by 0.57% in real terms that year to €23.85 billion ($26.94 billion), while Western Macedonia contracted by 10.6% to €3.85 billion ($4.35 billion). Almost half of the economy, 49%, is centred in the Thessaloniki regional unit.

The recession had an impact on the per capita income of the region, especially when compared with the European Union average. Western Macedonia, the region with the highest per capita income, saw it drop from 83% the EU average in 2008 to 59% in 2016. The per capita income of Macedonia in 2015 was €12,900 in nominal and €15,900 in purchasing power terms. The Macedonian economy is primarily service-based, with services contributing €16.46 billion (60.4%) of the region's gross value added in 2015. The industrial and agricultural sectors contributed €9.06 billion (33.3%) and €1.72 billion (6.3%) respectively. The regional labour force was similarly mostly employed in services (60.4%), with industry and agriculture making up 25.6% and 14.0% of the labour force.

Macedonia is home to Greece's richest farmland, and the region accounts for 9,859 square kilometres (3,807 sq mi) of the country's agricultural area (30% of total). Macedonia's agricultural production has historically been dominated by tobacco, with the cash crop being grown in large quantities due to its value. Central and Western Macedonia still produce 41% of Greece's total tobacco, but it only represents 1.4% of these regions' agricultural production value. Nowadays the regional agricultural economy is centered around cereal, fruit, and industrial crops. Overall Central and Western Macedonia account for 25% of the value of Greek agricultural produce (including 41% of fruit and 43% cereal). A brand identity for products made in Macedonia, called "Macedonia the GReat", was launched in 2019 by the Greek government.

The European Union considers most of Macedonia to be a less developed region of the Union for its 2014–2020 funding cycle, and so the region has in recent years benefited from a number of megaprojects co-financed by the Greek government and the EU. These included the A2 motorway (Egnatia Odos) freeway (€5.93 billion) and the Thessaloniki Metro (€1.85 billion) while the railway network has also been partly electrified, allowing Thessaloniki to be linked with Athens in 3.5 hours through a high speed railway. The Thessaloniki Regional Railway links the regional capital with Florina, in Western Macedonia, and Larissa, in Thessaly.

Macedonia benefits from EU programs promoting cross-border economic collaboration both between members of the Union (Bulgaria), as well as the Republic of North Macedonia, an EU candidate country, and Albania. The EU invested €210 million ($237.24 million) in these three programmes for the 2014–2020 funding cycle. A€10 billion ($11.3 billion) Egnatia Railway crossing Macedonia and linking Alexandroupoli in Western Thrace with Igoumenitsa in Epirus was proposed to the European Commission in 2017 but remains in planning with a projected start date in 2019. If completed, the 565 km (351 mi) railway line will be Europe's largest rail megaproject.

=== Airports ===
Thessaloniki Airport "Makedonia" is the third-busiest in the country, and the Athens–Thessaloniki air route was the EU's tenth busiest in 2016. Macedonia's three other airports are Kavala International Airport "Alexander The Great", Kozani Airport, and Kastoria Airport; the two busiest airports, Thessaloniki and Kavala, are operated by Fraport.

=== Ports ===
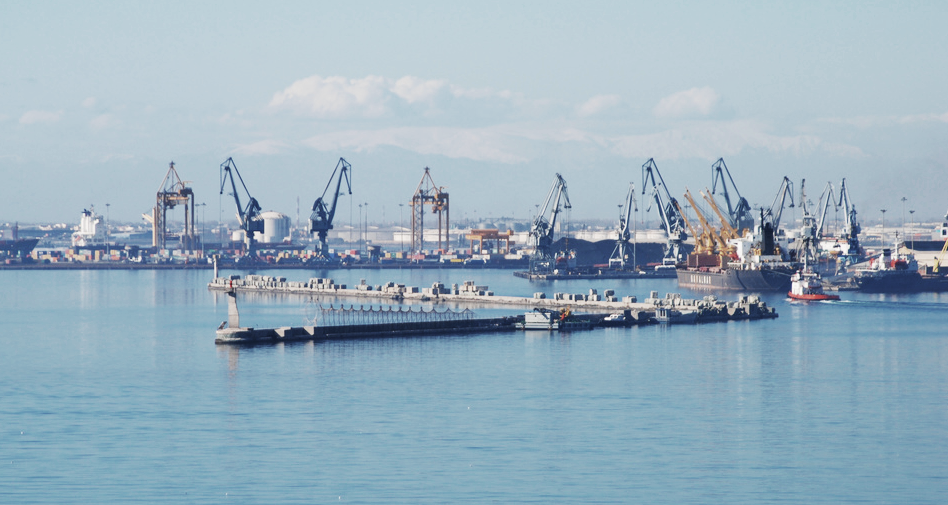
The port of Thessaloniki, the major economic and industrial centre

The Port of Thessaloniki is Greece's second-largest in domestic freight and fourth-largest in international freight by tonnage, while Kavala is Macedonia's other major port.

== Tourism ==
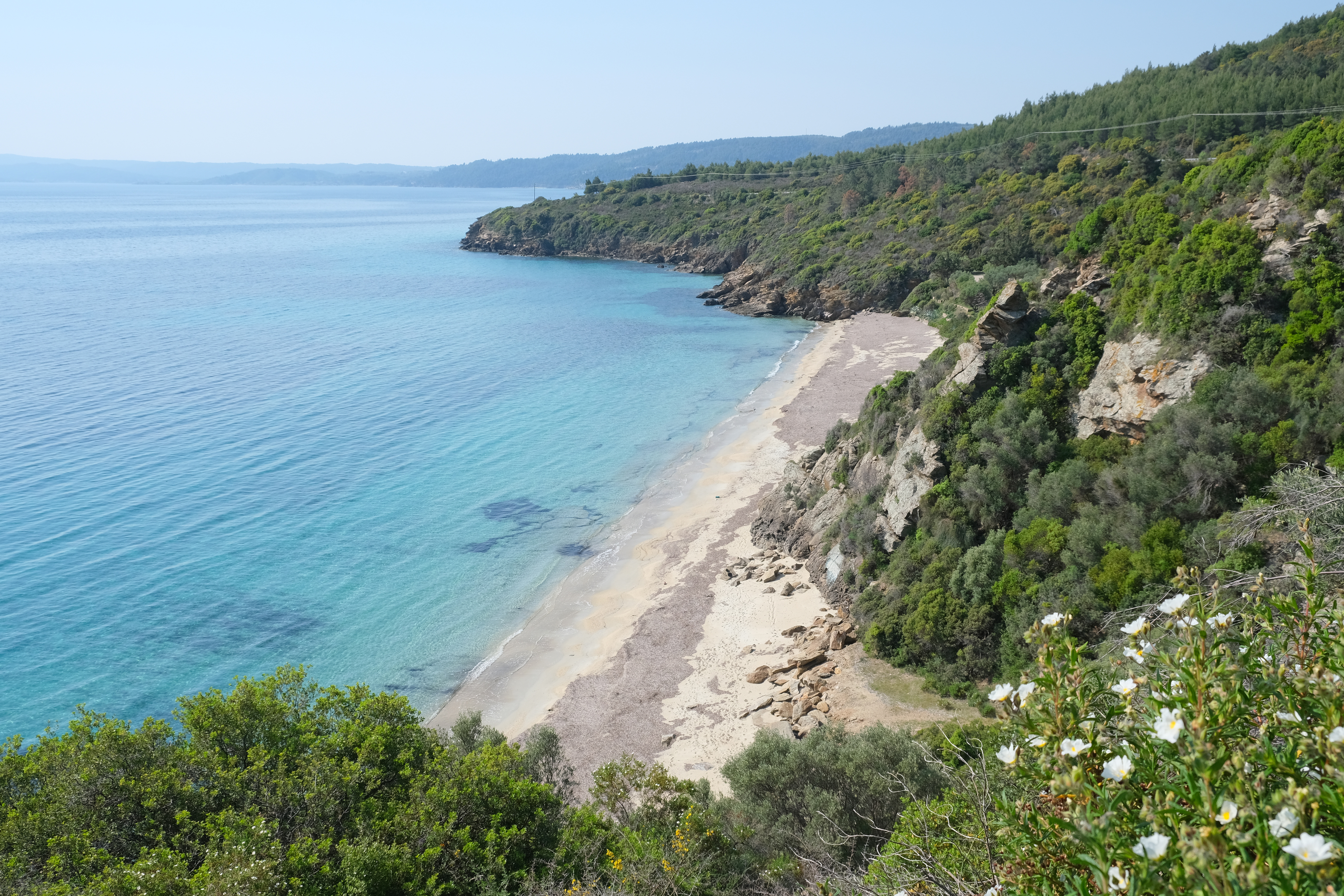
A beach in Chalkidiki

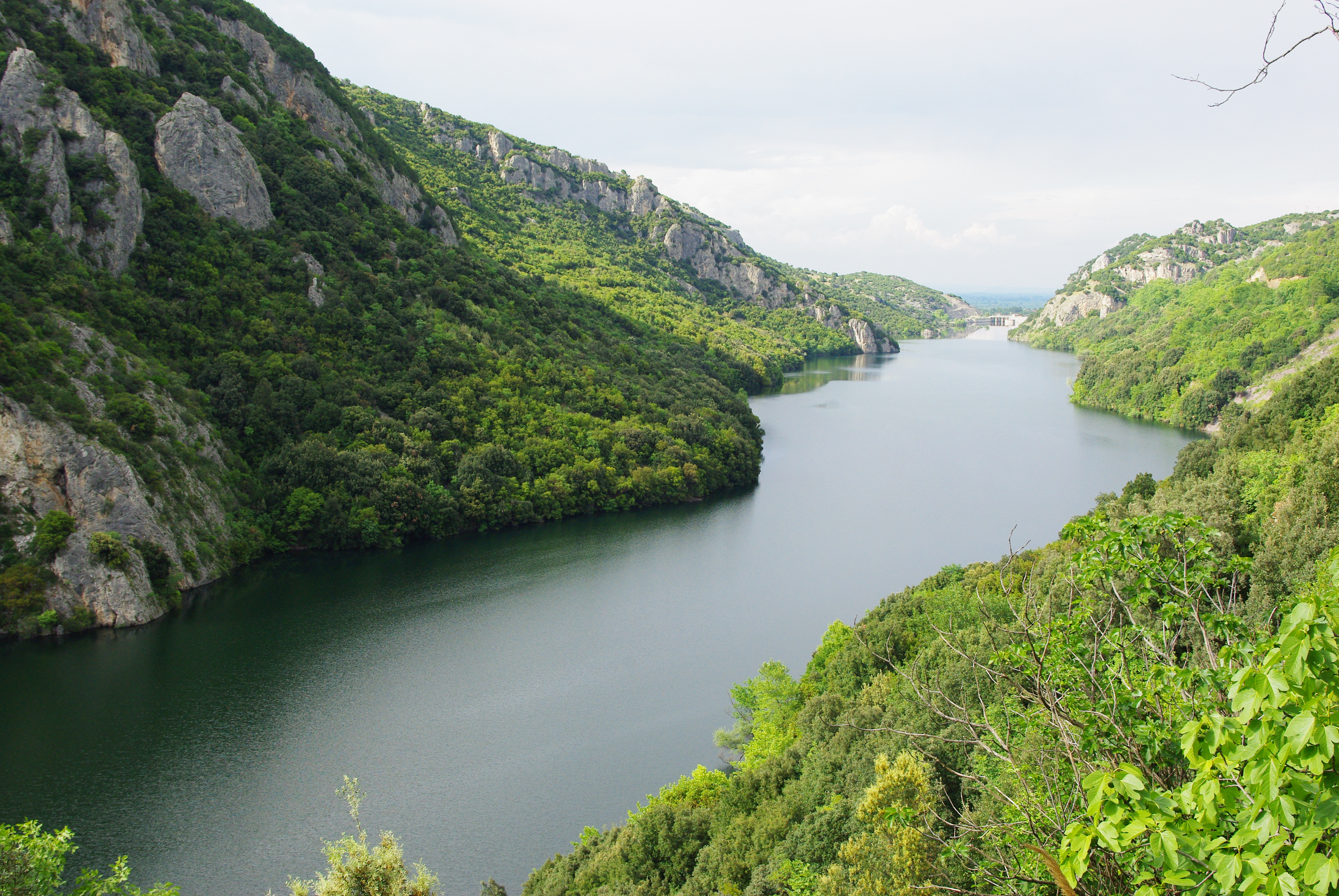
Polyphytos artificial lake on the Haliacmon, the longest river in Greece

Central Macedonia is the most popular tourist destination in Greece that is not an island, and its fourth overall, outperforming all other regions of the Greek mainland with 9.7 million overnight stays in 2017. There were a further 2.1 million stays in Eastern Macedonia and Thrace and 294 thousand in Western Macedonia.

Macedonia is a diverse region which allows it to cater to a variety of different types of tourism. The Chalkidiki peninsula is Macedonia's most popular beach destination, combining 550 kilometres (340 mi) of sandy beaches with dense forests. There were 116 Blue Flag beaches in Macedonia in 2018, 85 of which were in Chalkidiki. Additionally, the region was home to three Blue Flag marinas and one sustainable boating tourism operator. Kavala is an important economic centre of Northern Greece, a center of commerce, tourism, fishing and oil-related activities. Pieria combines extensive plains, high mountains and sandy beaches and the region's beauty gives it a great potential for further tourist development. The island of Thasos, lying close to the coast of eastern Macedonia, is another tourist destination. Chalkidiki is home to Mount Athos, which is an important centre of religious tourism. The mountainous interior allows for hiking activities and adventure sports, while ski resorts like Vasilitsa also operate in the winter months. Macedonia is home to four of Greece's 18 UNESCO World Heritage sites. Vergina is best known as the site of ancient Aigai (Αἰγαί, Aigaí, Latinized: Aegae), the first capital of Macedon. Aigai has been awarded UNESCO World Heritage Site status. In 336 BC Philip II was assassinated in Aigai's theatre and his son, Alexander the Great, was proclaimed king. The most important recent finds were made in 1977 when the burial sites of several kings of Macedon were found, including the tomb of Philip II of Macedon. It is also the site of an extensive royal palace. The archaeological museum of Vergina was built to house all the artifacts found at the site and is one of the most important museums in Greece. Pella, which replaced Aigai as the capital of Macedon in the fourth century BC, is also located in Central Macedonia, as well as Dion in Pieria and Amphipolis. Philippi, located in eastern Macedonia, is another UNESCO World Heritage Site. These are important poles for cultural tourism. Thessaloniki is home to numerous notable Byzantine monuments, including the Paleochristian and Byzantine monuments of Thessaloniki, a UNESCO World Heritage Site, as well as several Roman, Ottoman and Sephardic Jewish structures. Apart from being the cultural centre of Macedonia, Thessaloniki is also a hub for urban tourism and gastronomy. Macedonia is also home to various lake and wetland tourist destinations.

== Culture ==
=== Religion ===
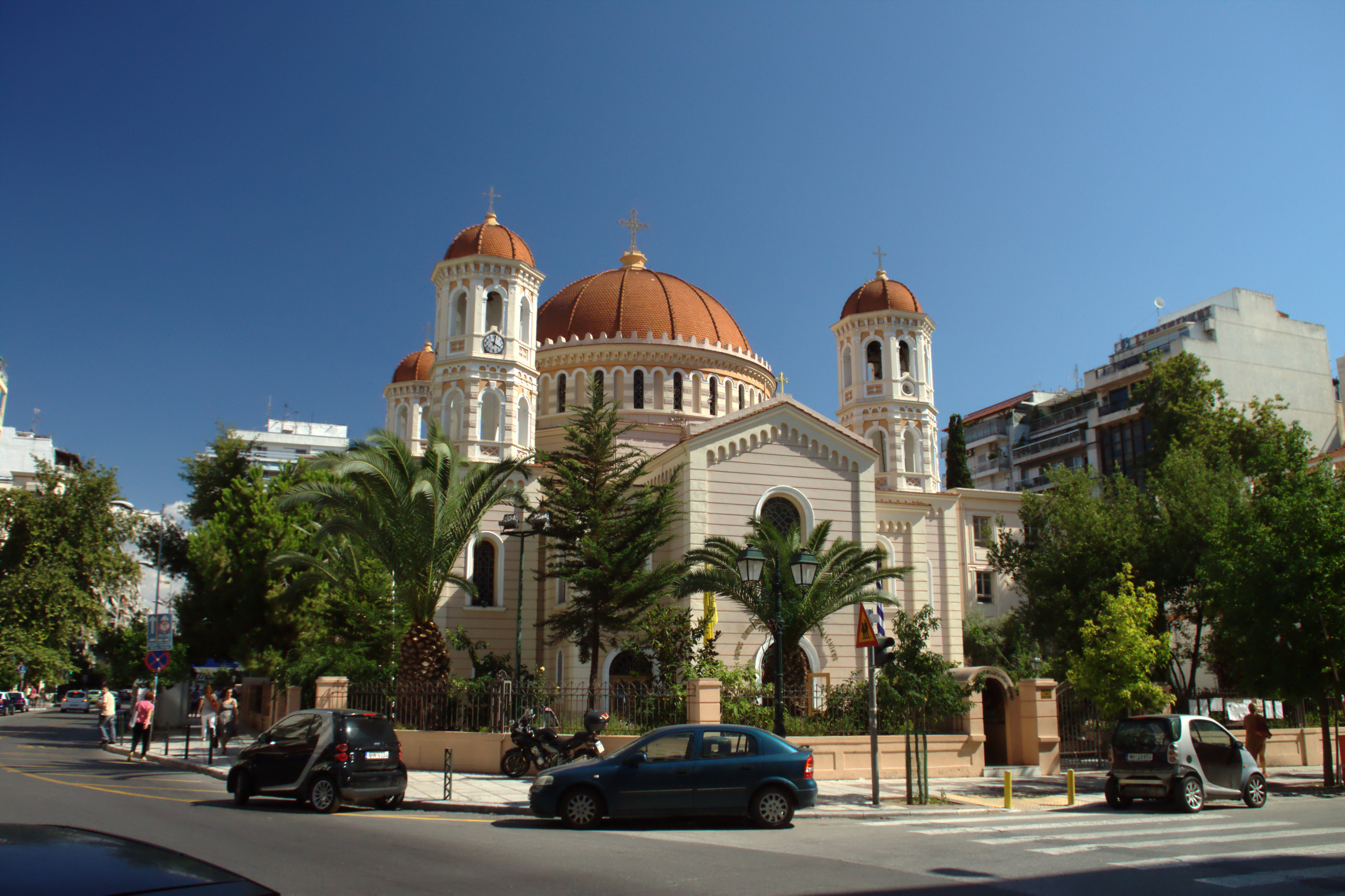
Saint Gregory Palamas Metropolitan Cathedral in Thessaloniki

The main religion in the Greek region of Macedonia is Christianity, with majority of population belonging to the Eastern Orthodox Church. In early centuries of Christianity, the see of Thessaloniki became the metropolitan diocese of the ancient Roman province of Macedonia. The archbishop of Thessaloniki also became the senior ecclesiastical primate of the entire Eastern Illyricum, and in 535 his jurisdiction was reduced to the administrative territory of the Diocese of Macedonia. In the 8th century, from Rome it came under the jurisdiction of the Ecumenical Patriarch of Constantinople, and remained the main ecclesiastical centre in the historical region of Macedonia throughout the Middle Ages, and up to the modern times.

=== Macedonian cuisine ===
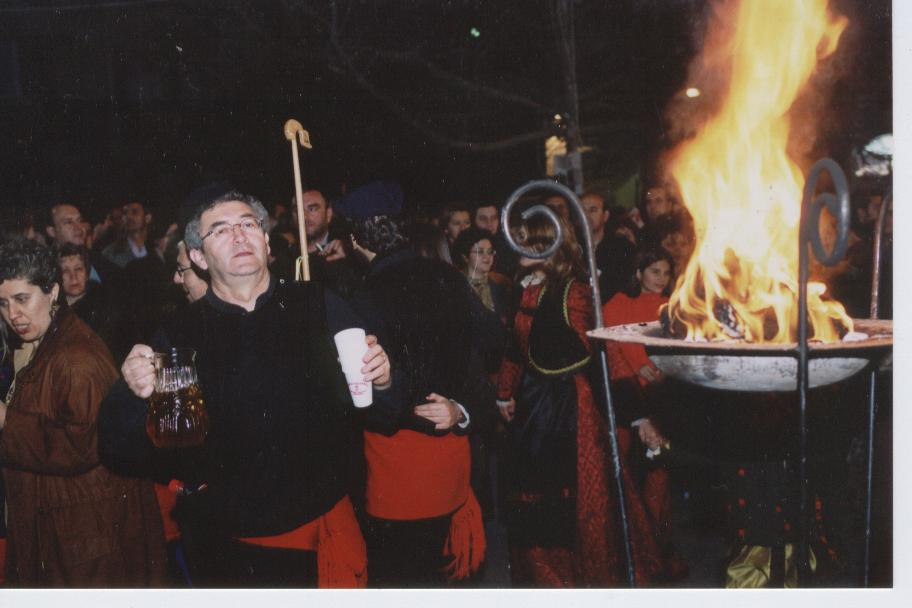
Fanos, an old carnival custom of Kozani

Contemporary Greek Macedonian cooking shares much with general Greek and wider Balkan and Mediterranean cuisine, including dishes from the Ottoman past. Specific influences include dishes of the Pontic, Aromanian, Armenian and Sephardi Jewish population. The mix of the different people inhabiting the region gave the name to the Macedonian salad.

=== Macedonian music ===
Music of Macedonia is the music of the geographic region of Macedonia in Greece, which is a part of the music of whole region of Macedonia. Notable element of the local folk music is the use of trumpets and koudounia (called chálkina in the local dialect). Famous Macedonia is often regarded as the regional anthem.

== Demographics ==
Population pyramid of Macedonia from the 2011 census

In 2011 the permanent population of the region stood at 2,406,393 residents, a decrease from 2,422,533 in 2001. As of 2017, the population of Macedonia is estimated to have further decreased to 2,382,857. In the 2011 Greek census the capital city, Thessaloniki, had an urban population of 824,676, up from 794,330 in 2001, while its metropolitan population increased to over a million. 281,458 people in Macedonia (or 12% of the population) were born in a foreign country, compared to 11.89% for the whole of Greece. 51.32% of the population was female, and 48.68% male. Like the rest of Greece Macedonia is faced with an aging population; the largest age group in the region is that of the over 70, at 15.59% of the population, while the 0–9 and 10–19 groups combined made up 20.25% of the population. The largest urban centres in Macedonia in 2011 were:

Largest cities and towns in Macedonia (Greece) Greek census 2021
Rank		Pop.	Rank		Pop.
1	Thessaloniki	802,572	11	Oraiokastro	23,626
2	Serres	59,260	12	Thermi	19,602
3	Katerini	59,189	13	Naousa	18,049
4	Kavala	54,065	14	Edessa	17,848
5	Drama	44,257	15	Florina	17,188
6	Kozani	43,316	16	Peraia	16,995
7	Veria	43,212	17	Kastoria	16,393
8	Ptolemaida	31,575	18	Alexandria	15,906
9	Giannitsa	30,498	19	Grevena	12,515
10	Kilkis	24,130	20	Diavata	11,876

=== Demographic history ===
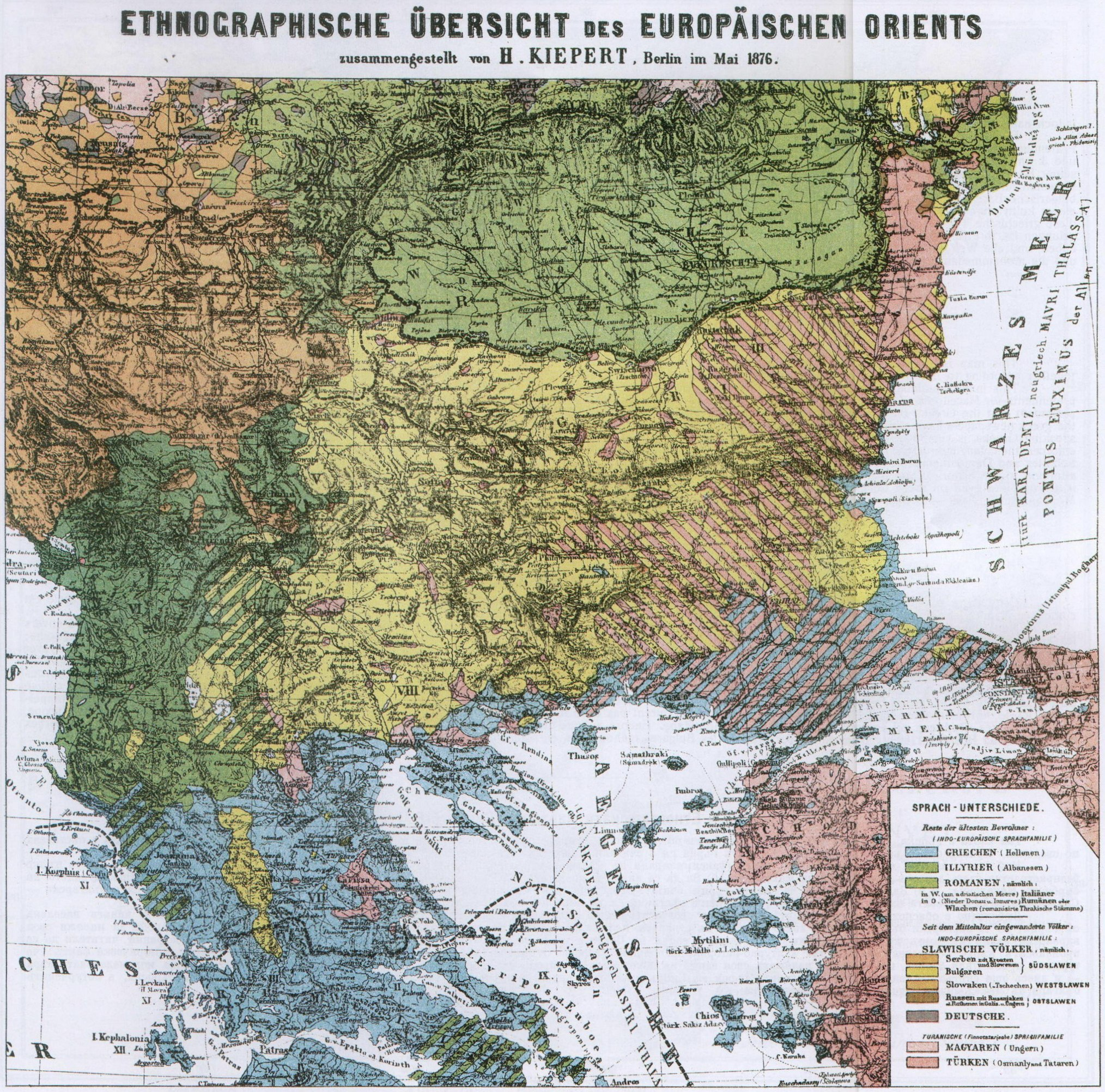
Ethnic map of the Balkans in 1876

The inhabitants of Greek Macedonia are nowadays overwhelmingly ethnic Greeks, and most are also Greek Orthodox Christians. From the Middle Ages to the early 20th century, the ethnic composition of the region of Macedonia is characterised by uncertainty both about numbers and identification. The earliest estimation we have is from the Greek consulate of Thessaloniki in 1884, which according to it the nowadays Greek region of Macedonia had 1,073,000 Greeks (Grecophones, Slavophones, Albanophones), 565,000 Muslims, 215,000 Bulgarians and 16,000 Aromanians. The 1904 Ottoman census of Hilmi Pasha people were assigned to ethnicity according which church/language they belonged, it recorded 373,227 Greeks in the vilayet of Selânik (Thessaloniki), 261,283 Greeks in the vilayet of Monastir (Bitola) and 13,452 Greeks in the villayet of Kosovo. Of those 648,962 Greeks by church, 307,000 identified as Greek speakers, while about 250,000 as Slavic speakers and 99,000 as "Vlach" (Aromanian or Megleno-Romanian). However, these figures extend to territories both inside and outside of Greek Macedonia. Hugh Poulton, in his Who Are the Macedonians, notes that "assessing population figures is problematic" for the territory of Greek Macedonia before its incorporation into the Greek state in 1913. The area's remaining population was principally composed of Ottoman Turks (including non-Turkish Muslims of mainly Bulgarian and Greek Macedonian convert origin) and also a sizeable community of mainly Sephardic Jews (centred in Thessaloniki), and smaller numbers of Romani, Albanians, Aromanians and Megleno-Romanians.

When Macedonia was first incorporated in Greece in 1913, however, Greeks were a marginal plurality in the region. The treaties of Neuilly (1919) and Lausanne (1923) mandated a forceful exchange of populations with Bulgaria and Turkey respectively, and some 776,000 Greek refugees (mostly from Turkey) were resettled in Macedonia, displacing 300,000–400,000 non-Greeks who were forced to move as part of the population exchange. The population of ethnic minorities in Macedonia dropped from 48% of the total population in 1920 to 12% in 1928, with the Great Greek Encyclopedia noting in 1934 that those minorities that remained "do not yet possess a Greek national consciousness".

The population of Macedonia was greatly affected by the Second World War, as it was militarily occupied by Nazi Germany while its ally, Bulgaria, annexed eastern Macedonia. Germany administered its occupation zone by implementation of the Nuremberg Laws, which saw some 43,000–49,000 of Thessaloniki's 56,000 Jews exterminated in the Auschwitz and Bergen-Belsen concentration camps. In its own zone of annexation, Bulgaria actively persecuted the local Greek population with the help of Bulgarian collaborationists. Further demographic change happened in the aftermath of the Greek Civil War, when many Slavs of Macedonia who fought on the side of the Democratic Army of Greece and fought to separate Greek Macedonia from the rest of Greece under the auspices of Yugoslavia, left Greece. These expatriates were the primary source of ethnic Macedonian irredentism and the appropriation of ancient Macedonian heritage.

=== Regional identity of Greek Macedonians ===
Apogevmatini headline quoting Kostas Karamanlis: "I myself am a Macedonian, just as 2.5 million Greeks."

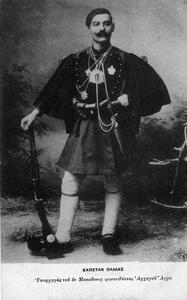
A man in Macedonomachos uniform

Macedonians (Greek: Μακεδόνες, Makedónes [makeˈðones]) is the term by which ethnic Greeks originating from the region are known. Macedonians came to be of particular importance prior to the Balkan Wars, during the Macedonian Struggle, when they were a minority population inside the multiethnic Ottoman Macedonia. The Macedonians now have a strong regional identity, manifested both in Greece and by emigrant groups in the Greek diaspora. This sense of identity has been highlighted in the context of the Macedonia naming dispute in the aftermath of the break-up of Yugoslavia, in which Greece objected to its northern neighbour calling itself the "Republic of Macedonia" (now North Macedonia). This objection is the result of this regional identity, and a matter of heritage for northern Greeks. A characteristic expression of this self-identification was manifested by Prime Minister Kostas Karamanlis at a meeting of the Council of Europe in Strasbourg in January 2007, declaring that "I myself am a Macedonian, and another two and a half million Greeks are Macedonians". The naming dispute was finally resolved in 2018 by the Prespa agreement, which includes an explicit clarification that the citizens of the Republic of North Macedonia are not related to the ancient Hellenic civilization that inhabited the northern region of modern-day Greece. Specifically, Article 7 mentions that both countries acknowledge that their respective understanding of the terms "Macedonia" and "Macedonian" refers to a different historical context and cultural heritage; when reference is made to Greece, these terms denote the area and people of its northern region, as well as the Hellenic civilization, history and culture of that region. When reference is made to the Republic of North Macedonia, these terms denote its territory, language and people, with their own, distinct, history and culture.

In the early-to-mid 20th century Greece was invaded by Bulgaria three times with the aim of capturing portions Macedonia; during the Second Balkan War, during the First World War, and during the Second World War. Additionally, Nazi Germany had promised Thessaloniki to Yugoslavia as a reward for joining the Axis powers. The perceived existence of a foreign danger had a particularly strong effect on the emergence of a distinct regional identity in Macedonia. The representation of the Macedonian Struggle in Penelope Delta's popular 1937 teen novel Secrets of the Swamp solidified the image of the chauvinist clash between Greeks and Bulgarians in Macedonia in the minds of many Greeks. Bulgaria was specifically mentioned as the enemy in Greek Macedonia's unofficial anthem, Famous Macedonia, the reference only being replaced by vague 'Barbarians' with the normalization of Greco-Bulgarian relations in the 1970s. During the same period, Manolis Andronikos made major archaeological discoveries at Aigai, the first capital of ancient Macedonia, which included the tomb of Phillip II, Alexander the Great's father. His discoveries were drawn upon as evidence of ethnic and cultural links between the ancient Macedonians and southern Greek city-states by Greeks in Macedonia.

The distinct regional identity of Greek Macedonians is also the product of the fact that it (especially Thessalonica) was closer to the centres of power in both the Byzantine and Ottoman period, was considered culturally, politically, and strategically more important than other parts of Greece during these two periods, and also the fact that the region had a far more ethnically and religiously diverse population in both the medieval and Ottoman periods. In the late Byzantine period Greek Macedonia had also been the centre of significant Byzantine successor states, such as the Empire of Thessalonica, the short-lived state established by the rival Byzantine emperor, Theodore Komnenos Doukas, and – in parts of western Macedonia – the Despotate of Epirus, all of which helped promote a distinct Greek Macedonian identity.

In the contemporary period this is reinforced by Greek Macedonia's proximity to other states in the southern Balkans, the continuing existence of ethnic and religious minorities in Eastern Macedonia and Thrace not found in southern Greece, and the fact that migrants and refugees from elsewhere in the Balkans, southern Russia, and Georgia (including Pontic Greeks and Caucasus Greeks from northeastern Anatolia and the south Caucasus) have usually gravitated to Greek Macedonia.

=== Languages and minorities ===
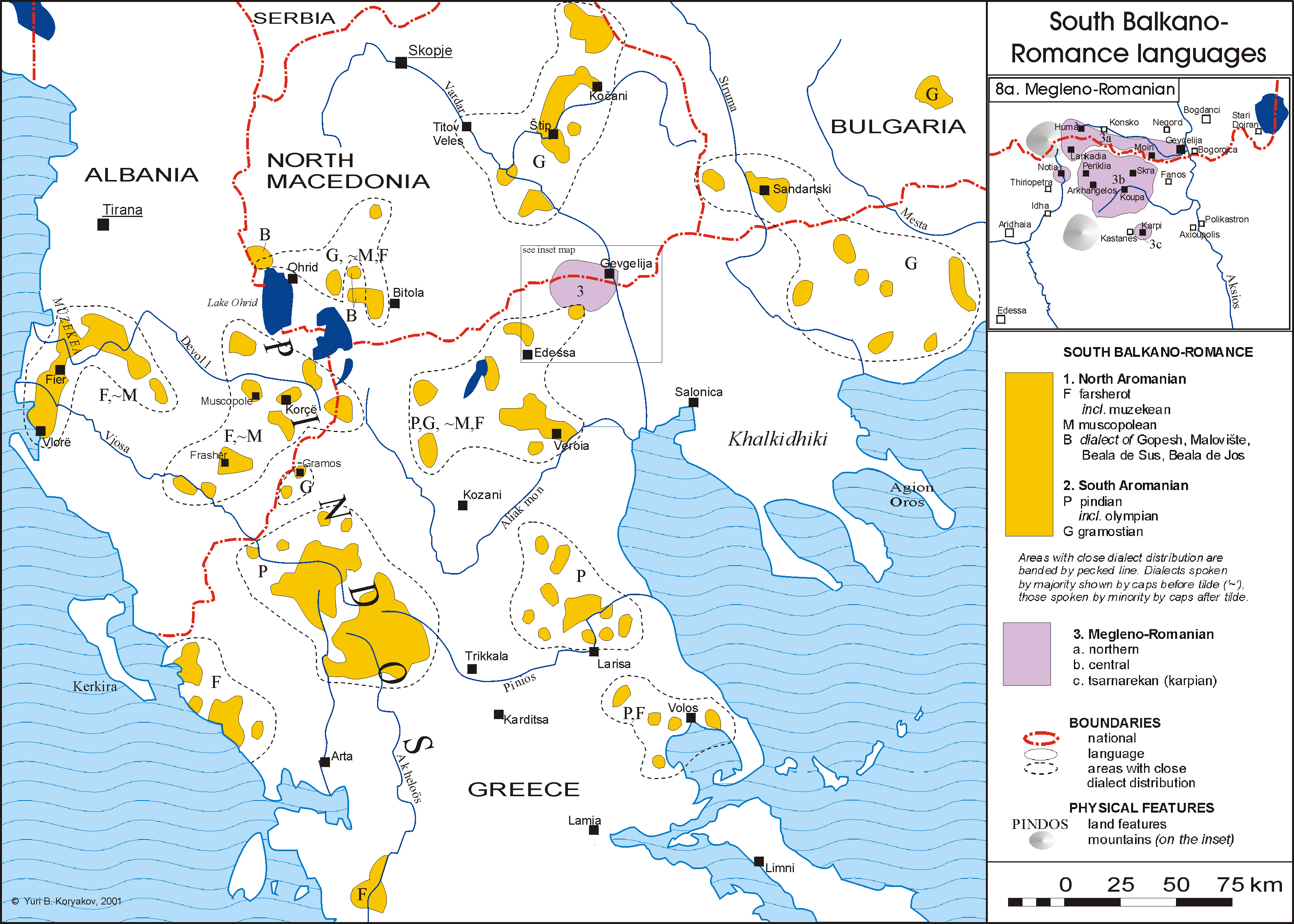
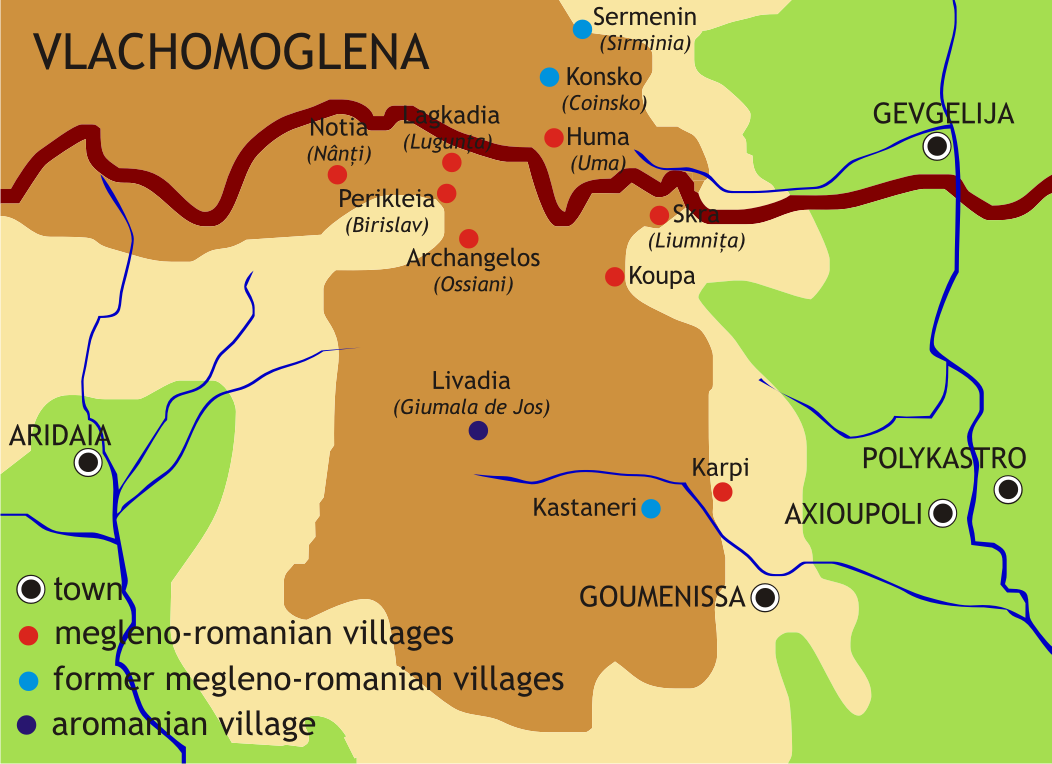
Right: The Megleno-Romanian and the Aromanian linguistic area.
Left: Map of the Megleno-Romanians settlements.

Greek is the majority language throughout Greece today, with an estimated 5% of the population speaking a language other than Greek, and is the only language of administration and education in the region. Greek is spoken universally in Greek Macedonia, even in the border regions where there is a strong presence of languages other than Greek. The Greek government exhibits some tolerance toward the use of minority languages, though Greece is one of the countries which has not signed the European Charter for Regional or Minority Languages; a number of court cases have been brought to the attention of the European Parliament regarding the suppression of minority linguistic rights.

Apart from Standard Modern Greek, a number of other Greek dialects are spoken in Macedonia. This includes Pontic Greek, a language spoken originally on the shores of the Black Sea in northeastern Anatolia and the Caucasus, as well as a dialect indigenous to Greek Macedonia and other parts of Northern Greece known as Sarakatsánika (Greek: Σαρακατσάνικα); spoken by the traditionally transhumant Greek subgroup of Sarakatsani.

Macedonia is also home to an array of non-Greek languages. Slavic languages are the most prevalent minority languages in the region, while Aromanian, Arvanitic, Megleno-Romanian, Turkish, and Romani are also spoken. Judaeo-Spanish, also known as Ladino, was historically the language of the Jewish community of Thessaloniki, although the Holocaust nearly eradicated the city's previously-vibrant Jewish community of 70,000 to a mere 3,000 individuals today.

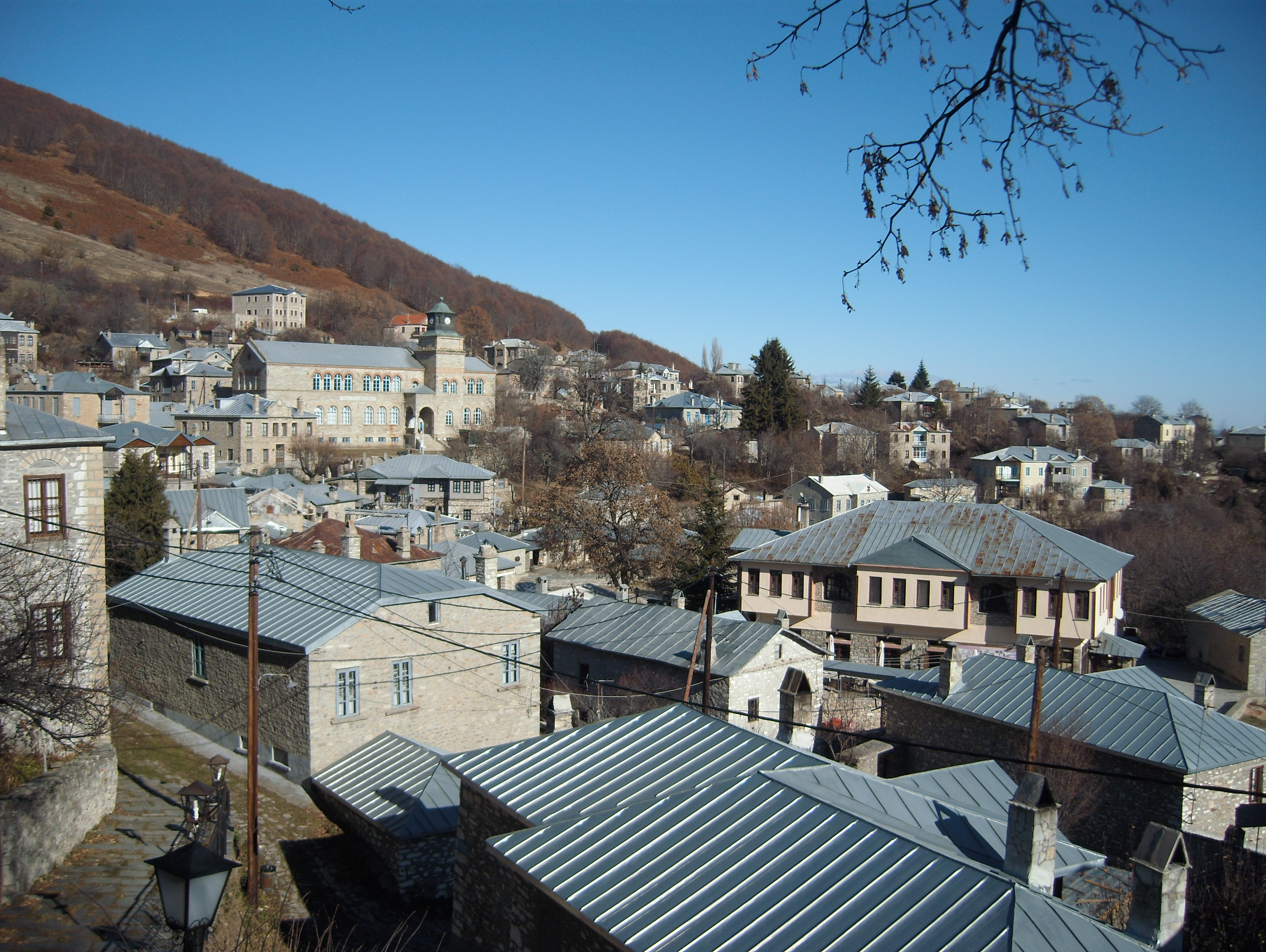
The Aromanian (Vlach) village of Nymfaio, example of traditional architecture

The exact size of the linguistic and ethnic minority groups in Macedonia is not known with any degree of scientific accuracy, as Greece has not conducted a census on the question of mother tongue since 1951. Aromanians form a minority population throughout much of Macedonia. They largely identify as Greeks and most belong to the Greek Orthodox Church, many refusing to be called a minority group. In the 1951 census they numbered 39,855 in all Greece (the number in Macedonia proper is unknown). Many Aromanian villages can be found along the slopes of the Vermion Mountains and Mount Olympus. Smaller numbers can be found in the Prespes region and near the Gramos mountains. Megleno-Romanians can be found in the Moglena region of Macedonia. The Megleno-Romanian language is traditionally spoken in the 11 Megleno-Romanian villages spread across Greece and the Republic of North Macedonia, including Archangelos, Notia, Lagkadia, and Skra. They are generally adherents to the Orthodox Church while the former majority in Notia was Muslim. Arvanite communities exist in Serres regional unit, while many can also be found in Thessaloniki. There are three Arvanite villages in the Florina regional unit (Drosopigi, Lechovo and Flampouro) with others located in Kilkis and Thessaloniki regional units. Other minority groups include Armenians and Romani. Romani communities are concentrated mainly around the city of Thessaloniki. An uncertain number of them live in Macedonia from the total of about 200,000–300,000 that live scattered on all the regions of Greece.

==== Ethnic Macedonian minority and language ====
Distribution of the Macedonian and other languages in the Florina and Aridaia regions of Greek Macedonia

The Macedonian language, a member of the South Slavic languages closely related to Bulgarian, is today spoken mostly in the regional units of Florina and Pella. Due to the sensitivity of the use of term 'Macedonian', the language is euphemistically referred to as dópia (ντόπια, 'local') or nasi (Macedonian: наши or naši, 'our (language)').

The exact number of the minority is difficult to know as Greece has not collected data on languages as part of its census since 1951. The 1928 census listed 81,984 speakers of 'Slavomacedonian' in Greece, but internal government documents from the 1930s put the number of Macedonian speakers in the Florina prefecture alone at 80,000 or 61% of the population. A field study conducted in 1993 in these two regions under the auspices of the European Parliament found that of the 74 villages studied, Macedonian was spoken in various degrees of vitality in 49 villages and was the primary language in 15 villages. To a lesser extent Macedonian is also present in the regional units of Kastoria, Imathia, Kilkis, Thessaloniki, Serres, and Drama. The Greek language remains dominant in all regions, even in those where Macedonian and other minority languages are present. The total number of 'slavic speakers' in Greece is estimated to range between as low as 10,000 and as high as 300,000.

Greece has had varied policies toward the Macedonian language. In 1925 the Greek government introduced the first Macedonian alphabet book, known as the Abecedar, based on the Florina dialect of the language; this never entered classrooms due to opposition from Serbia and Bulgaria, as well as an outcry against it in Greece. Efforts to assimilate resulted in instances of populations rejecting their Slavic language, as in the village of Atropos in 1959, where the villagers took "the oath before God" to cease speaking the local Slavic idiom and to only speak Greek. The Macedonian language has survived despite efforts by Greek authorities to assimilate the population into the Greek majority. The vast number of Macedonian speakers are ethnic Greeks or possess a Greek national consciousness. It is difficult to ascertain the number of those with a different national consciousness, but estimates of the number of people within Greece that possess an ethnic Macedonian national identity range between 5,000 and 30,000.

Greece claims to respect the human rights of all its citizens, including the rights of individuals to self-identify, but also claims its policy of not recognising an ethnic Macedonian minority is based "on solid legal and factual grounds". However, reports by organisations such as the Organization for Security and Co-operation in Europe, the Council of Europe, and the United States Department of State have all concluded that Greek authorities are actively discriminatory against the existence of a Macedonian language, minority, or national identity, even if the situation has improved markedly. An ethnic Macedonian political party, Rainbow, has competed in Greek elections for the European Parliament since 1995. In the 2019 election it received 6,364 votes or 0.11% of the national vote and came 35th in the results table, with most its support coming from Florina where it received 3.33% of the vote.

==== Jews of Thessaloniki and other cities ====
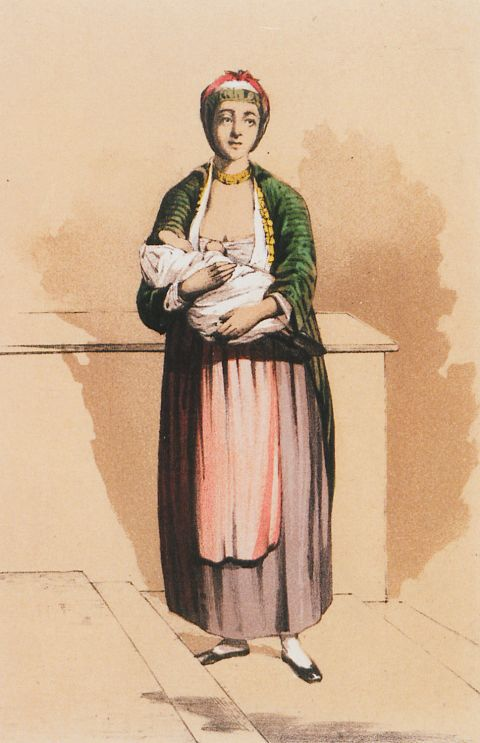
Jewish woman from Thessaloniki, gravour of late 19th century

Northern Greece has had Jewish communities since ancient times, including the historically-significant and Greek-speaking Romaniote community. During the Ottoman era Thessaloniki became the centre of a Sephardi community which comprised more than half the city's population, as Ottoman authorities invited Jews who had been expelled from Castille in the aftermath of the Alhambra Decree of 1492 to resettle in the Ottoman Empire. The community nicknamed the city la madre de Israel (the mother of Israel) and Jerusalem of the Balkans, and brought with it the Judaeo-Spanish, or Ladino, language which became the mother tongue of Thessaloniki Jews. By the 1680s about 300 families of Sephardi followers of Sabbatai Zevi had converted to Islam, becoming a sect known as the Dönmeh (converts), and migrated to Thessaloniki, whose population was by that time majority-Jewish. They established an active community that thrived for about 250 years. Many of their descendants later became prominent in trade. Thessaloniki Jews later became pioneers of socialism and the labour movement in Greece.

Between the 15th and early 20th centuries, Thessaloniki was the only city in Europe where Jews were a majority of the population. The Great Thessaloniki Fire of 1917 destroyed much of the city and left 50,000 Jews homeless. Many Jews emigrated to the United States, Palestine, and Paris after the loss of their livelihoods, being unable to wait for the government to create a new urban plan for rebuilding, which was eventually done. The aftermath of the Greco-Turkish War and the expulsion of Greeks from Turkey saw nearly 100,000 ethnic Greeks resettled in Thessaloniki, reducing the proportion of Jews in the total community. Following the demographic shift, Jews made up about 20% of the city's population. During the interwar period, Greece granted the Jews the same civil rights as other Greek citizens.

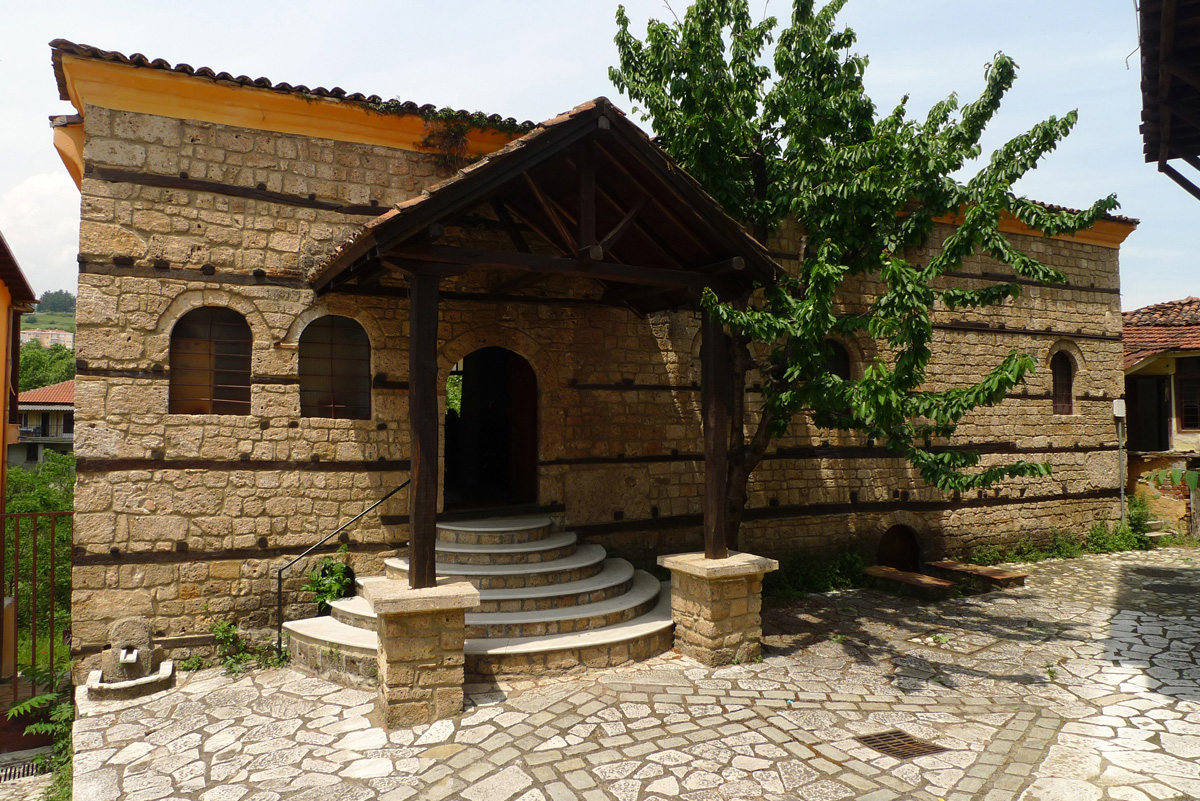
The Jewish synagogue of Veria

According to Misha Glenny, such Greek Jews had largely not encountered "anti-Semitism as in its North European form". Though antisemitism was used both by the Metaxas dictatorship and by newspapers such as Makedonia as part of the wider mechanism for identifying leftists, Greek Jews were either neutral or supportive of Metaxas. By the 1940s, the great majority of the Jewish Greek community firmly identified as both Greek and Jewish. World War II was disastrous for Greek Jews; the Battle of Greece saw Greek Macedonia occupied by Italy, Bulgaria, and Nazi Germany, with the latter occupying much of Central Macedonia and implementing the Nuremberg Laws against the Jewish population. Greeks of the Resistance and Italian forces (before 1943) tried to protect the Jews and managed to save some. In 1943 the Nazis began actions against the Jews in Thessaloniki, forcing them into a ghetto and beginning their deportation to concentration camps in German-occupied territories. They deported 56,000 of the city's Jews, by use of 19 Holocaust trains, to Auschwitz and Bergen-Belsen concentration camps, where 43,000–49,000 of them were killed. Today, a community of around 1,200 remains in the city. Communities of descendants of Thessaloniki Jews – both Sephardic and Romaniote – live in other areas, mainly the United States and Israel. Other cities of Greek Macedonia with significant Jewish population (Romaniote or Sephardi) in the past included Veria, Kavala and Kastoria.

== Archaeological sites ==
- Pella
- Aigai
  - Vergina Tombs
- Amphipolis
  - Kasta Tomb
- Aiani
- Dion
- Philippi
- Stageira
- Europus (Macedonia)
- Paleochristian and Byzantine monuments of Thessaloniki
- Arch of Galerius and Rotunda
- Mieza
- Agios Athanasios, Thessaloniki
- Tomb of Judgement, Lefkadia
- Tomb of Lyson and Kallikles

== See also ==
- List of Macedonians (Greek)
- Ancient Macedonian Greek
- Seleucus I Nicator
- Ptolemy I
