= Derdas III =

4th century BCE archon of Elimiotis

Derdas III (Ancient Greek: Δέρδας) was probably the ruler of Elimiotis in mid 4th century BCE, or at least one of its military commanders. He was probably of the same family as Derdas I and Derdas II, but no evidence exists to say what the relationships were. There are two brief mentions of him in ancient sources, both passed on by Athenaeus.

Dicæarchus relates in the third book of his Life in Greece., “But Philip,” says he, “was always marrying new wives in war time. For, in the twenty-two years which he reigned, as Satyrus relates in his History of his Life, having married Audata the Illyrian, he had by her a daughter named Cynna, and he also married Phila, a sister of Derdas and Machatas…”

The reference here is to Philip II of Macedon, father of Alexander the Great. Philip was credited by Satyrus with seven wives, foremost of which were Olympias, Alexander’s mother, and Cleopatra, a late love-match that brought total discord into his house. His marriage to Phila was a minor affair, no doubt concluded for political reasons to secure his alliance with Elimiotis. There is no mention of any resulting offspring. For the record, Derdas’ brother Machatas had two sons who joined Alexander on his expedition to Asia: Harpalos (Alexander’s treasurer) and Philip (later appointed satrap of India by Alexander). A second report from Athenaeus said:

And Theopompus gives a regular catalogue of men fond of drinking and addicted to drunkenness… And in his twenty-third book, speaking of Charidemus of Oreum, whom the Athenians made a citizen, he says: “For it was notorious that he spent every day in the greatest intemperance, and in such a manner that he was always drinking and getting drunk, and endeavoring to seduce free-born women; and he carried his intemperance to such a height that he ventured to beg a young boy, who was very beautiful and elegant, from the senate of the Olynthians, who had happened to be taken prisoner in the company of Derdas the Macedonian.”

The reference here is to the year 348, when Olynthus was under attack from Philip II’s Macedonian army. The Olynthians had asked Athens for help repelling this encroachment on its territory, and the Athenians sent their general Chares in 349, to little effect, and Charidemus in 348, who apparently had some minor success, if we can surmise from this report that the Olynthians were holding Derdas and this young boy captive.

Other than these two references, there is no evidence of his existence.
