= Tauron =

Tauron may refer to:

- Tauron Group, Polish energy group
- Tauron, Macedonian aristocrat, one of Alexander the Great's commanders
- One of the Twelve Colonies in the Battlestar Galactica science fiction franchise
