= Aiani =

Town in Western Macedonia, Greece

Aiani Αιανή
- Municipal unit
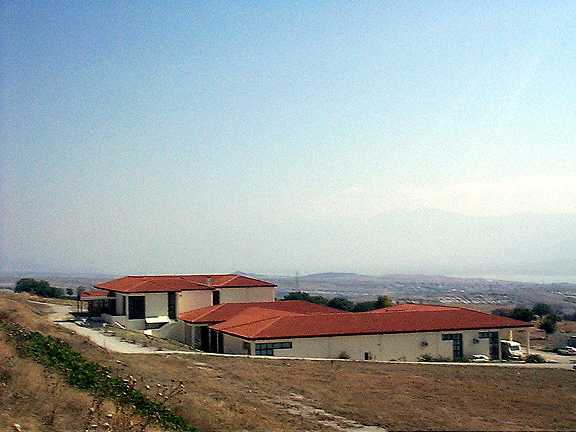

- Location within the regional unit

- Location within Greece
- Coordinates: 40°10′N 21°49′E
- Country: Greece
- Administrative region: West Macedonia
- Regional unit: Kozani
- Municipality: Kozani

Area
  - Municipal unit: 156.004 km^{2} (60.233 sq mi)
  - Community: 52.336 km^{2} (20.207 sq mi)

Population (2021)
  - Municipal unit: 2,826
  - Municipal unit density: 18.11/km^{2} (46.92/sq mi)
  - Community: 1,586
  - Community density: 30.30/km^{2} (78.49/sq mi)
- Time zone: UTC+2 (EET)
  - Summer (DST): UTC+3 (EEST)
- Postal code: 500 04
- Area code: +30-2461
- Vehicle registration: KZ

Aiani (Greek: Αιανή, before 1926: Καλλιανή - Kalliani) is a town and a former municipality in the Kozani regional unit, Macedonia, Greece. Since the 2011 local government reform it is part of the municipality Kozani, of which it is a municipal unit and historical seat of the municipality of Kozani. It is located near Haliacmon river and is 22 km south of the city of Kozani. The municipal community of Aianis is classified as an urban semi-mountainous settlement. The 2021 census recorded 1,586 residents in the village and 2,826 residents in municipal unit of Aiani. The municipal unit has an area of 156.004 km^{2}, the community 52.336 km^{2}.

== Name ==
It took its name from the Aianus (Ancient Greek: Αἰανος). According to the Greek mythology Aianus was the son of Elymus., the supposed Trojan ancestor of the Elymians, an indigenous people of Sicily in Greek and Roman legend.

== History ==
Hunters' and farmers' dwellings on the banks of the Haliacmon river, such as Vervir, Pulimistra and Karamaczouks, are mentioned as the first settlements.

In ancient times, Aiani belonged to the kingdom of Elimiotis, which together with the rest of the Greek kingdoms (Tymphaea, Orestis, Lynkestis, Eordaia, Pelagonia and Derriopos) constituted the Upper Macedonia of Ancient Greece. According to the founding myth saved by Stephanus of Byzantium, Aiani, "city of Macedonia" was built by Aianos, son of Elymos and founder of Elimiotis. The existence of the city of Aiani is confirmed by two epigraphic testimonies.

The excavation brought to light architectural remains of the city, clusters of tombs and organized cemeteries, dating from the prehistoric to the late Hellenistic era. These new findings confirm that very early Aiani occupied the position of capital in the kingdom of Elemia.

In prehistoric times Aiani was a notable production center of the so-called dark-colored pottery, the origin of which goes back to Middle Helladic (1900-1600 BC) standards of southern Greece. Its residents are considered to be the northwestern Greek tribes, to which the Macedonians belonged, who, according to Herodotus, migrated from Pindus to Dryopis and Peloponnese, where they were called Dorians. At the same time the abundance of Mycenaean finds from the area makes the existence of Mycenaean facilities in Upper Macedonia more and more likely. Amongst the archaic pottery, some of the oldest samples of writing were found. Amongst them we have names inscribed like ΔΟΛΙΟ (DOLIO) and ΘΕΜΙΔΟΣ (THEMIDOS), which prove that the society of that region of Macedonia, spoke and wrote Greek before the 5th century BC. A single example of linear writing similar to that of southern Greece has been found, but its significance still remains unknown.

The ancient city is identified with the city that develops on the overlapping plateaus of a hill with the characteristic name of Megali Rahi. Three large public buildings and many private residences have been excavated with rich finds. The two buildings, conventionally known as the Great Buildings and the Stoic Building, are characterized by porticoed spaces and despite the destruction, especially of the marble architectural members, they have pieces of painted gutters, doric and ionic capitals, as well as semi-column flywheels. These presuppose the existence of a first floor and testify to the magnificence and correct architectural organization of the space. The so-called Stoic Building of the middle platform is probably interpreted as an ancient market. In the courtyard of the third building, on the top plateau, a huge circular tank carved into the rock was revealed, which, by collecting rainwater, contributed to the city's water supply. The earliest construction phases of the above buildings date back to the beginning of the 5th century BC. and continue uninterrupted until the 1st c. BC, rather peacefully and moved to another area, apparently with the dominance of the Romans. The areas of the houses are in some cases divided, due to the slope of the ground at different levels. Stairs with stone steps lead to the upper rooms, while at the same time basements are formed on the back side. Houses had small courtyards, rooms with hearths, storerooms with pithoen (storage areas filled with jars for keeping liquid and solid food) and rooms - workshops with stone hand mills in the corners. You can visit the houses with the conventional names House of Pitharias, House of Stairs and House of Agnithes (stones used in ancient weaving), which go back to the Hellenistic period (300-100 BC).

The city had direct cultural and commercial relations with the rest of Hellenism. At the same time it operated independently with its own workshops for metalwork, coroplast (artisan) (clay figurines) and ceramics. The discovery of public and private buildings shapes the image of an organized city already from the Late Archaic and Classical years (beginnings of the 5th - 4th centuries BC, while the 6th century is also represented by ceramic finds), which substantiates the opinion that there were prosperous and organized cities in Upper Macedonia long before the unification of Macedonian Hellenism by Philip II, to whom historians attribute the founding of the first city-urban centers. At the same time the discovery of archaic and classical inscriptions confirms the use of the written word and proves that the lack of early inscriptions until now was due to the limited and not systematic excavation research of the Macedonian land.

Known kings of Elimia were Arrhidaeus (c. 472 BC), three kings with the name Derdas (I c. 442 BC, II c. 382 BC, III c. 358 BC) and "Pausanias and other brothers" of Derdas I as mentioned. Finally Phila, sister of Derdas III and Mahatas, was the first of the seven wives of Philip II, while according to one opinion, Eurydice, daughter of Sirras and mother of Philip II, came from Elimia.

== Communities ==
The municipal unit Aiani is subdivided into the following communities:

- Agia Paraskevi
- Aiani
- Chromio
- Kerasea
- Kteni
- Rodiani
- Rymnio

== See also ==
- List of settlements in the Kozani regional unit
