= Aiani Archaeological Museum =

Museum in Aiani, Greece

Archaeological Museum of Aiani
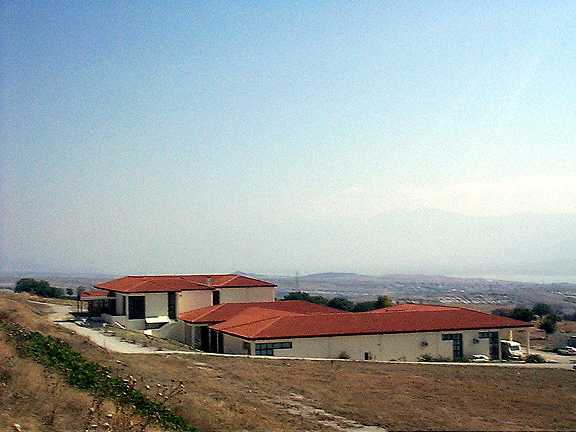
- Established: 1970
- Location: AIani, Kozani, 50004
- Coordinates: 40.16832°N 21.82584°E
- Website: https://www.mouseioaianis.gr

The Aiani Archaeological Museum is a museum in Aiani, West Macedonia, Greece.

Although the museum was inaugurated in 1970, with a collection of antiquities of the ancient city but in 1983 a number of major additional finds meant that the museum had to be expanded considerably to house the new objects.

The building of a new museum began in 1992 but was delayed by events such as an earthquake on 13 March 1995. After storage in various places including the town hall, the museum was eventually completed in 1997, but only two of the museums exhibition rooms opened in October 2002.

Now located in a two-storey building, the Archaeological Museum of Aiani displays the history of ancient Aiani, capital of Elimiotis which was one of the most important kingdoms of Upper Macedonia.

Important collections include finds of the Late Bronze Age (1500 -1200 BC) and the Archaic and Classical periods (600 -500 BC), which provide an important insight into the formation of the Doric-Macedonian peoples in the region and the civilian and political development of Aiani, particularly during the Sixth Century B.C.

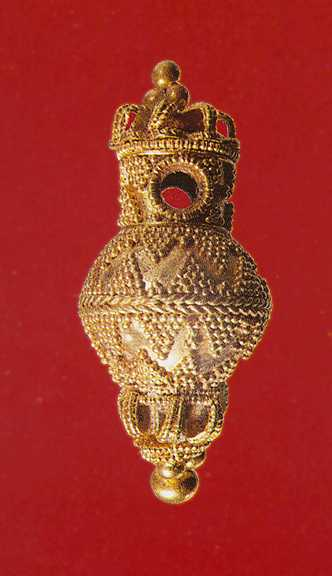
A gold fibula from the 2nd half of the 6th century BC

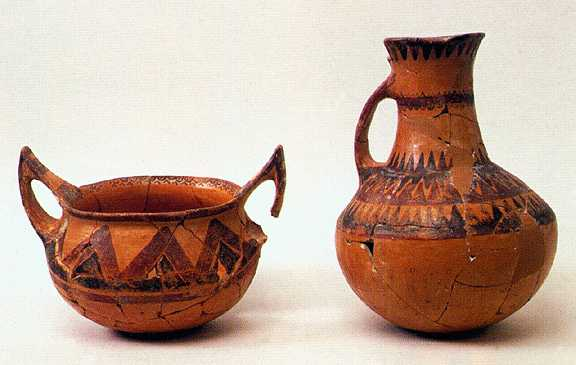
Vessels with matt-painted decoration from the 14th century BC

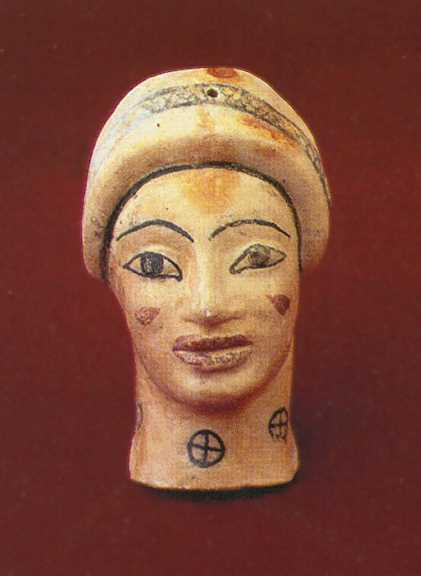
Clay figurine of a kore (young woman), dated to the second half of the 6th century B.C.

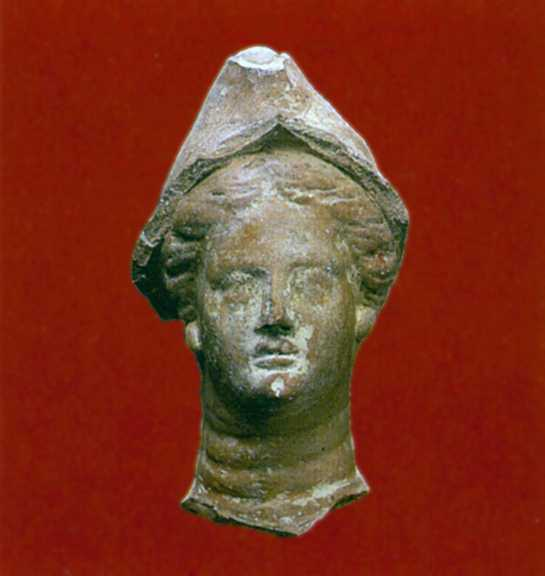
Clay figurine of ancient Greek Goddess Athena

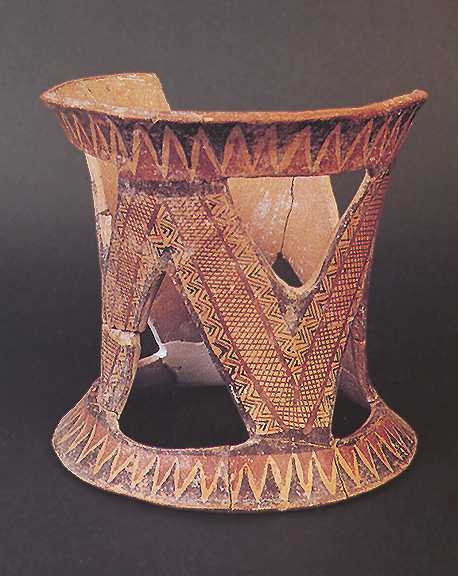
A clay stand with matt-painted decoration from the 14th century BC
