= Stena =

Stena may refer to:

- Ştena, a commune in Romania
- Stena (Macedonia), a station in ancient Macedonia
- Stena Sphere, Swedish conglomerate
  - Stena Line, a ferry operator
- Stena (walrus), an animal in Finland

== See also ==
- Kteni, a village in the region of Macedonia, Greece; whose name in Macedonian is Стени (transliteration, "Steni")
