= Derdas II =

4th-century BC ruler of Elimiotis

Derdas II (Ancient Greek: Δέρδας) was the ruler of the region of Elimiotis (Ἐλιμιώτις), also rendered as Elymia (Ἐλιμία) and Elimeia (Ἐλίμεια), in the early 4th century BCE. Elimiotis was a client state of Macedon.

The year 394/3 was a time of dynastic uncertainty in Macedon. The Macedonian king Aëropus, who had usurped the throne in 398/7 died this year of an illness and was succeeded by his son Pausanias. His reign was short, as we learn from Diodorus Siculus:

Pausanias too, the king of the Macedonians, died after a reign of one year, being assassinated by Amyntas, who seized the kingship and reigned twenty-four years.

In this report Diodorus missed a step. Pausanias was, indeed, killed by "Amyntas", but not the man who reigned for twenty-four years. Aristotle, in a discussion of royal assassinations, said in his Politics:

Any sort of insult (and there are many) may stir up anger, and when men are angry, they commonly act out of revenge, and not from ambition. For example… Amyntas the Little [was killed] by Derdas, because he boasted of having enjoyed his youth.

Scholars today give Aristotle credit for knowing the order events better than Diodorus, primarily because he lived at the Macedonian court only a few years after these events and would have known many of the witnesses. The accepted conclusion is that Amytas the Little (who was the son of either the rebellious Philip discussed above or his brother Menelaus) was, in turn, eliminated by Amyntas, son of Arrhidaeus, from another branch of the royal family (who became Amyntas III). Rather than do the deed himself, Amyntas III prevailed upon Derdas, a scion of the ruling family of Elimiotis, and probably either the son or grandson of Derdas I to act for him. Aristotle's comment suggests that Derdas already had reasons to resent Amyntas the Little.

Derdas II was later an active participant in a four-year campaign (382–379) waged by Sparta against Olynthus, the leading city of the Chalcidike, which was attempting to build a league of cities on that peninsula. Two cities under pressure to join, Akanthos and Apollonia, sought help from Sparta in resisting this threat. Sparta, having assumed responsibility for keeping the peace throughout Greece since defeating Athens in the Peloponnesian War, committed to the project of reining in Olynthus.

During the next four summers, Sparta repeatedly sent armies north to the region to attack Olynthus. In this effort, they sought troops from within the Peloponnese, Boeotia, Thessaly and Macedon. Among those from the last was a four-hundred man cavalry under the command of Derdas, “ruler of Elimeia”. In the first summer, it appears that Derdas' participation was somewhat reluctant. When mounting an attack on Olynthus, the Spartan commander Teleutias stationed Derdas and his cavalry:

next to himself on the left… He did this both because he admired this cavalry unit and because he wished to honor Derdas, so that he would be glad he had joined the expedition.

The attack faltered at one point and

the entire force would probably been defeated if Derdas had not immediately advanced toward the gates of the city with his entire cavalry force… The Olynthian cavalry realized what was happening and, becoming afraid they would be cut off from the gates, turned about and returned to the city in great haste. And that is where Derdas killed a great number of the cavalry as they attempted to pass by him…

Olynthos was not defeated, however, and the next summer (381) Derdas anticipated the renewal of campaign by taking his cavalry to Apollonia in the spring. The Olynthians chose to attack the city before the Spartan army arrived, but as they approached the gates, Derdas counterattacked, routing them and chasing them all the way back to Olynthos itself. After this, the Olynthians kept close to home.

The campaign went on for another two summers, but eventually the Olynthians sued for peace (379) and made a formal alliance with Sparta.
