= Rymnio =

Rymnio Ρύμνιο
- Community
- Location within Greece
- Coordinates: 40°08′00″N 21°52′16″E
- Country: Greece
- Administrative region: Western Macedonia
- Regional unit: Kozani
- Municipality: Kozani
- Municipal unit: Aiani
- Elevation: 330 m (1,080 ft)

Population (2021)
  - Community: 115
- Time zone: UTC+2 (EET)
  - Summer (DST): UTC+3 (EEST)
- Postal code: 50500
- Area code: +30 24640

Rymnio (Greek: Ρύμνιο) is a village located in Aiani municipal unit, Kozani regional unit, in the Greek region of Macedonia. It is situated on the south shore of the Aliakmon River at an altitude of 330 meters. At the 2021 census, the population was 115. The town of Kozani, the seat of the region, is 29 km from Rymnio.
