= Kerasea, Kozani =

Community in Kozani regional unit in the Greek region of Macedonia

Kerasea Κερασέα
- Community
- Location within Greece
- Coordinates: 40°11′45″N 21°47′43″E
- Country: Greece
- Administrative region: Western Macedonia
- Regional unit: Kozani
- Municipality: Kozani
- Municipal unit: Aiani

Population (2021)
  - Community: 144
- Time zone: UTC+2 (EET)
  - Summer (DST): UTC+3 (EEST)
- Postal code: 50150
- Area code: +30 2461

Kerasea (or Kerasia) is a community located in Aiani municipal unit, Kozani regional unit, in the Greek region of Macedonia. It is situated at an altitude of 540 meters above sea level. At the 2021 census, the population was 144.
