= Rodiani =

Rodiani Ροδιανή
- Community
- Location within Greece
- Coordinates: 40°12′09″N 21°45′10″E
- Country: Greece
- Administrative region: Western Macedonia
- Regional unit: Kozani
- Municipality: Kozani
- Municipal unit: Aiani
- Elevation: 680 m (2,230 ft)

Population (2021)
  - Community: 246
- Time zone: UTC+2 (EET)
  - Summer (DST): UTC+3 (EEST)
- Postal code: 50150
- Area code: 24610

Rodiani (Greek: Ροδιανή), known before 1927 as Radouvista (Ραδουβίστα), is a community located in Aiani municipal unit, Kozani regional unit, in the Greek region of Macedonia. It is situated at an altitude of 680 meters. At the 2021 census, the population was 246. The town of Kozani, seat of the region, is 14 km from Rodiani.
