= Hellanicus =

Hellanicus or Hellanikos (Ancient Greek: Ἑλλάνικος) may refer to:

- Hellanicus of Lesbos (5th century BC), Greek logographer and historian
- Hellanicus (grammarian) (3rd century BC), Greek grammarian; see Chorizontes
- Hellanicus (mythology), one of the suitors of Penelope
- Hellanicus, supposed author of the Hieronyman Theogony
