= Tauron (son of Machatas) =

Macedonian aristocrat and commander

Tauron (Ancient Greek: Ταύρων), son of Machatas and brother of Harpalus and Philip, was the commander of archers under the service of Alexander the Great. Late in 331 BC or early in 330 BC he was sent by Alexander with a force to attack a town of the Uxii. Along with Seleucus and Antigenes, in 326 BC he led a phalanx against Porus in the battle of the Hydaspes.
