= Chorizontes =

Chorizontes (Ancient Greek: χωρίζοντες; "separators") was the name given to a group of ancient Alexandrian scholars who argued that the Iliad and Odyssey were not written by the same person. The best known of them were the grammarians Xenon and Hellanicus, but they are nonetheless extremely obscure figures about whom nothing else is known. Aristarchus of Samothrace was one of their opponents.

== See also ==
- Homeric scholarship
