= Machatas of Elimeia =

4th-century BC Elimiotis noble

Machatas of Elimiotis (Ancient Greek: Μαχάτας) was an Upper Macedonian, father of Harpalus, Tauron and Philip (the satrap of India). He was a brother of Derdas and Phila, one of the many wives of Philip II, and belonged to the family of the princes of Elimiotis. After the expulsion of those princes he seems to have resided at the court of Philip, though it would appear from an anecdote recorded by Plutarch that he hardly enjoyed consideration corresponding to his former rank.
