= Kteni =

Kteni Κτένι
- Community
- Location within Greece
- Coordinates: 40°10′35″N 21°46′20″E
- Country: Greece
- Administrative region: Western Macedonia
- Regional unit: Kozani
- Municipality: Kozani
- Municipal unit: Aiani
- Elevation: 680 m (2,230 ft)

Population (2021)
  - Community: 55
- Time zone: UTC+2 (EET)
  - Summer (DST): UTC+3 (EEST)
- Postal code: 50150
- Area code: +30 2461

Kteni (Greek: Κτένι) is a village located in Aiani municipal unit, Kozani regional unit, in the Greek region of Macedonia. It is situated at an altitude of 680 meters. At the 2021 census, the population was 55. The town of Kozani, seat of the regional unit, is 21 km from Kteni.

There is also a nearby castle, that was destroyed in 1649 by Albanian gangs. Its ruins are still present to this day. The village of Kteni lies close to Mount Bourinos.
