= Derdas I =

5th-century BC ruler of Elimiotis

Derdas I (Ancient Greek: Δέρδας) was the ruler of the region of Elimiotis (Ἐλιμιώτις), also rendered as Elymia (Ἐλιμία) and Elimeia (Ἐλίμεια), in the mid 5th century BCE.

Almost all information about him comes from a few passages in Thucydides, who said that in the lead up to the Peloponnesian War (431–404), the Athenians allied with one Philip, brother of the Macedonian king Perdiccas II, who sought to claim the throne for himself. The reason for this alliance was not explained in ancient sources, but Konstantinos Karathanasis has speculated that, in response to the recent Athenian settlement at Amphipolis (437) on Macedon's eastern frontier, Perdiccas began to restrict sales of timber to Athens, and that this was the spur that induced the Athenians to support Philip.

Thucydides, in the above cited passage, reported that in this campaign Philip was aided by Derdas, who was not specifically identified, but was presumably a member of the Macedonian nobility and probably a relative. Why Derdas would support Philip in this internecine struggle is also not known.

Derdas appears to have died shortly after this series of events began. After giving some background on the situation, Thucydides reported that Philip was now supported by the "brothers of Derdas". He later said that when the Athenians were marching on Potidaea (one of the early engagements of the war), they were joined by "six hundred Macedonian horsemen, the followers of Philip and Pausanias". A later scholiast commented that Pausanias was either a son or brother of Derdas.
