= Elimiotis =

Historical region of Upper Macedonia

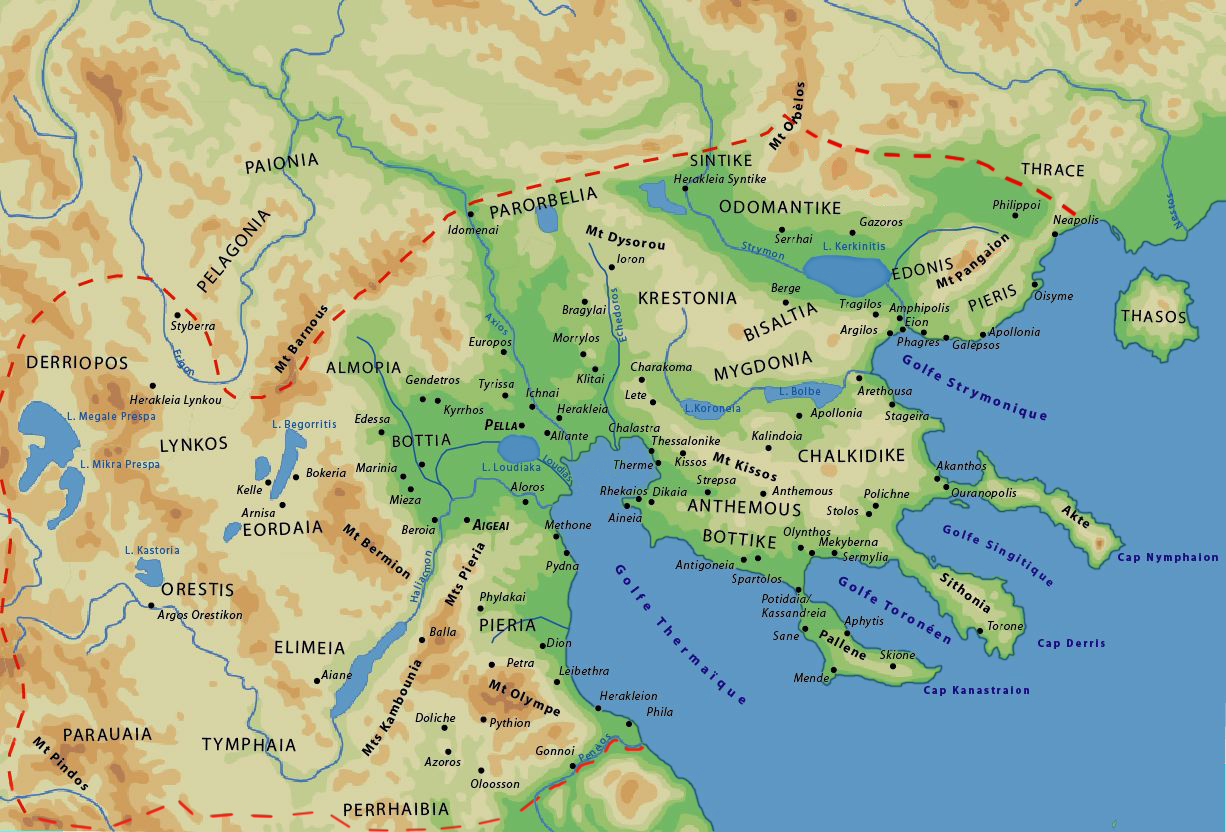
Map of the Kingdom of Macedon with Elimiotis located in the south-western districts of the kingdom

Elimiotis or Elimeia (Ancient Greek: Ἐλιμιῶτις or Ἐλιμία or Ἐλίμεια) was a region of Upper Macedonia that was located along the Haliacmon river, and was inhabited by the Molossian tribe of Elimiotes or Elimiotae (Ancient Greek: Ἐλιμιῶται), who spoke a Northwest Greek dialect.

== History ==
The capital of Elimiotis was Aiani, located in the modern municipality of Kozani, Western Macedonia, Greece. It was bordered by Tymphaea and Parauaea in the west, Orestis and Eordaea in the north, Pieria in the east, and Perrhaebia (Thessaly) in the south.

In earlier times, it was independent and the Derdas family ruled the local kingdom from its capital Aiane. However, later it lost its independence and by 355 BC, Elimiotis was part of the kingdom of Macedon ruled by Philip II of Macedon. Phila of Elimeia, sister of Derdas III and Machatas of Elimeia, was the first or second wife of Philip II.

== Archons of Elimiotis ==
- Arrhidaeus (born before 513 BC)
- Derdas I (505–435)
- Sirras (437–390)
- Derdas II (385–360)
- Derdas III (360–355), last king of Elimiotis

== Notable people ==
- Antigonus I Monophthalmus (382–301 BC), Hellenistic ruler, founder of the Antigonid dynasty
- Calas, general and satrap of Alexander the Great
- Coenus, general of Alexander the Great
- Phila of Elimeia, wife of Philip II of Macedon
- Cleander, officer of Alexander the Great
- Harpalus, noble and boyhood friend of Alexander the Great
- Machatas of Elimeia, noble of Elimiotis
- Philip of Machatas, general of Alexander the Great
- Polemocrates, noble of Elimiotis

== See also ==
- Aiani Archaeological Museum
- Phiale of Megara
- Lynkestis
- Epirus (ancient state)
- Aeolic Greek
