= Harpalus =

Macedon aristocrat

- Born: 4th century BC
- Died: 323 BC; Crete
- Occupation: Treasurer
- Years active: 330 BC-324 BC
- Children: Calas
- Father: Machatas of Elimeia

Harpalus (Greek: Ἅρπαλος), son of Machatas, was a Macedonian aristocrat and childhood friend of Alexander the Great in the 4th century BC. Harpalus was repeatedly entrusted with official duties by Alexander and absconded with large sums of money on three occasions. Alexander appointed him treasurer of his empire in Babylon in 330 BC. In 324 BC he fled from Babylon to Athens with a large sum of money. The resulting political controversy in Athens ("the Harpalus Affair") was a contributing factor in the Lamian War.

== Life ==
Lame in one leg and therefore exempt from military service, Harpalus did not follow Alexander into the Persian Empire, but was nevertheless given a post in Asia Minor. Alexander is said to have contacted him to request some reading material for his leisure time. Harpalus sent the king plays by Aeschylus, Sophocles and Euripides, the History of Philistus and odes by Philoxenus and Telestes.

=== Harpalus Affair ===
In 324 BC, Harpalus sought refuge in Athens. He was imprisoned by the Athenians at the instigation of Demosthenes and Phocion, despite the opposition of Hypereides, who wanted an immediate—and certain to fail—uprising against Alexander. The Ecclesia, at the suggestion of Demosthenes, decided to guard Harpalus' money, which was entrusted to a committee headed by Demosthenes himself. When the committee counted the money, they found 350 talents, although Harpalus had declared that he had 700 talents.

When Harpalus escaped and fled to Crete, the orator faced a new wave of public outrage. The Areopagus held an inquiry, the results of which led to Demosthenes being charged with the misuse of 20 talents from the money Harpalus had brought. At Demosthenes' trial in the Heliaia before an unusually large jury of 1,500, Hypereides, the chief prosecutor, pointed out that Demosthenes had admitted taking the money, but said that he had used it for the people and had borrowed it free of interest. The prosecutor rejected this argument and accused Demosthenes of being bribed by Alexander. Demosthenes was found guilty, fined 50 talents and imprisoned, as he was unable to pay such a huge sum, but after a few days, thanks to the carelessness or connivance of some citizens, he escaped and travelled around Calauria, Aegina and Troezen. The Athenians soon overturned the sentence and sent a ship to Aegina to bring Demosthenes back to the port of Piraeus.

Demosthenes did not return to Athens until nine months later, after Alexander's death. On his return he "received from his countrymen an enthusiastic welcome, such as had never been accorded to any returning exile since the days of Alkibiades". It remains unclear whether the charges against him were justified or not, but such a reception, the circumstances of the case, the Athenians' need to appease Alexander, the urgency of accounting for the missing funds, Demosthenes' patriotism and desire to free Greece from Macedonian rule, all support George Grote's view that Demosthenes was innocent, that the charges were politically motivated, and that he "was neither paid nor bought by Harpalus".

=== Death on Crete ===
According to Pausanias, "shortly after Harpalus ran away from Athens and crossed with a squadron to Crete, he was put to death by the servants who were attending him (in 323 BC), though some assert that he was assassinated by Pausanias, a Macedonian". The geographer also tells the following story: "The steward of his money fled to Rhodes, and was arrested by a Macedonian, Philoxenus, who also had demanded Harpalus from the Athenians. Having this slave in his power, he proceeded to examine him, until he learned everything about such as had allowed themselves to accept a bribe from Harpalus. On obtaining this information he sent a dispatch to Athens, in which he gave a list of such as had taken a bribe from Harpalus, both their names and the sums each had received. Demosthenes, however, he never mentioned at all, although Alexander held him in bitter hatred, and he himself had a private quarrel with him."

=== Legacy ===
According to Cicero, Diogenes the Cynic professed that Harpalus, by living such a high life despite his misdeeds, offered "a kind of witness (testimonium) against the gods".

Harpalus appears in the historical novel Fire From Heaven by Mary Renault. In it, he is entrusted by his teacher Aristotle with the task of observing and recording the lives of wild animals. Renault speculates that this would explain some of the fantastic accounts in Aristotle's zoological writings as Harpalian hoaxes.
