= Military tactics of Alexander the Great =

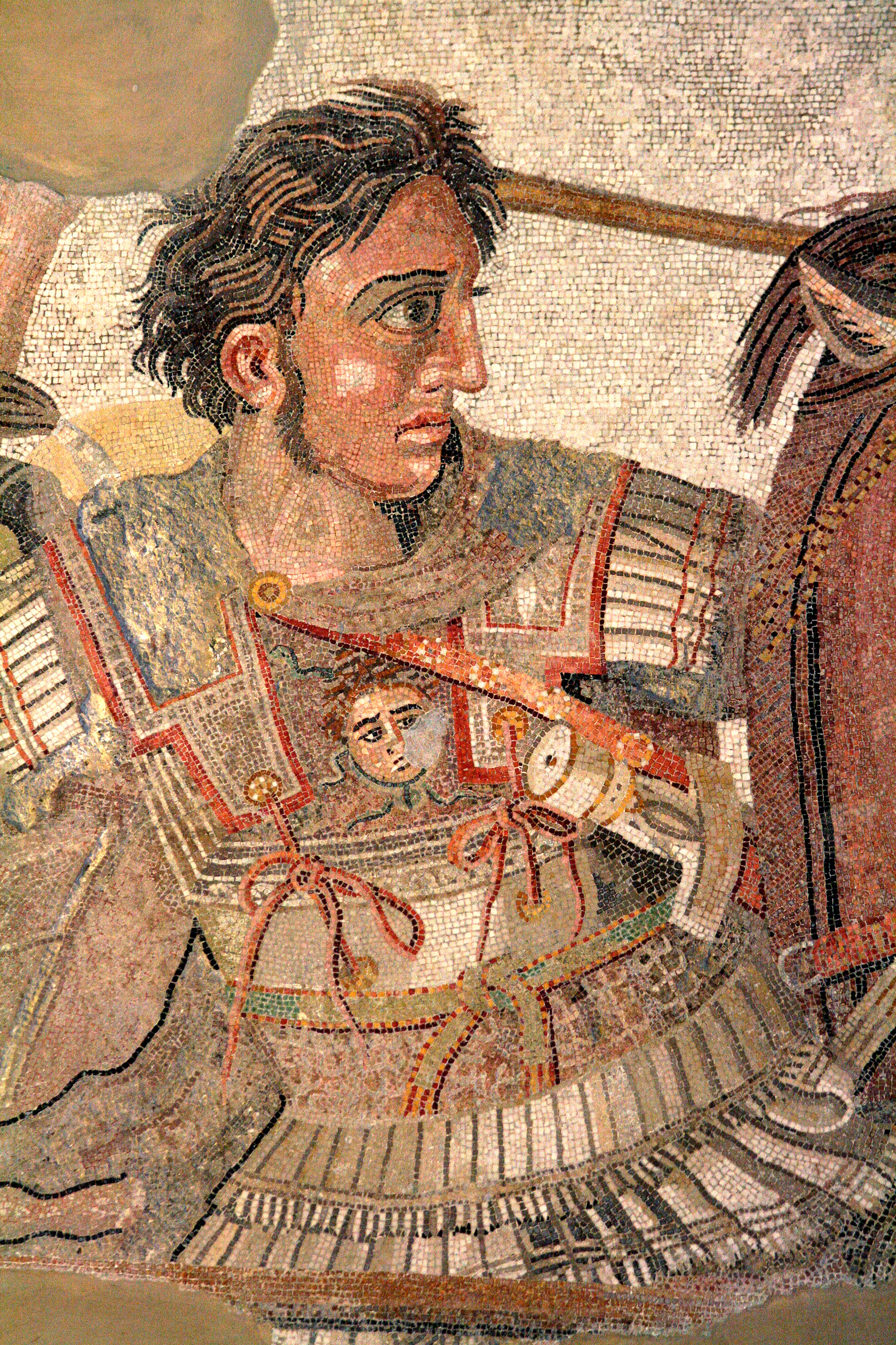
Alexander the Great in battle. Detail of the Alexander Mosaic (A Roman copy of a Hellenistic painting).

The military tactics of Alexander III of Macedon (356 BC - 323 BC), known as Alexander the Great, have been widely regarded as the core of his continuous success in battle throughout his campaigns. The Macedonian army that Alexander inherited had been created by his father, Philip II of Macedon. Additionally, Alexander employed and further refined the tactics his father had developed. At the battles of Granicius (334 BC) and Issus (333 BC), Alexander relied on the so-called 'hammer and anvil' tactic. At the Battle of Gaugamela (331 BC), he had to employ an innovative combat formation. Alexander arranged his units in a hollow square or box formation, to prevent the Persians, who were very strong in cavalry, from outflanking him and attacking his flanks and rear. However, the battle was still decided by the frontal attack of the phalanx (anvil) and the decisive charge of the Companion cavalry (hammer). Gaugamela was also an example of the refused flank tactic, regularly employed by the Macedonian heavy infantry when attacking.

== Troop composition and weapons ==
=== Infantry ===
The origin of Macedonian infantry conforming to the hoplite panoply and tactics of the Greek city states can be traced back to the reign of Archelaus.

...when Archelaus was king ... he organized his forces for war with a greater number of horses, weapons and resources than the other eight kings who had preceded him combined.

Before him, the only heavy infantry available to the Kingdom of Macedonia was supplied by the allied Greek cities.

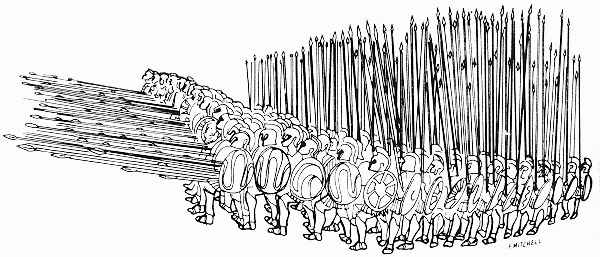
Macedonian phalanx. The Corinthian helmet was not as widespread as shown in the image.

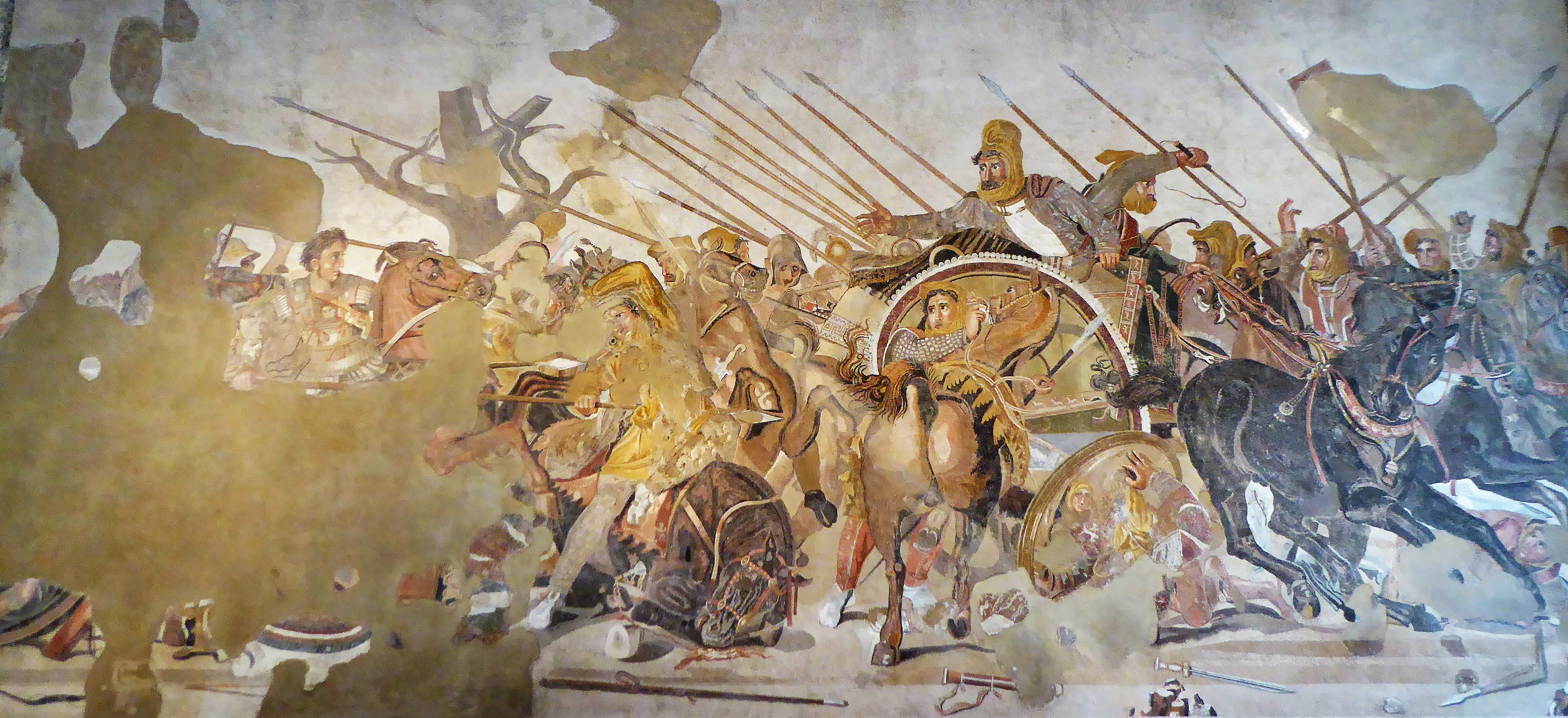
Battle of Issus, or Battle of Gaugamela, depicted on the Alexander Mosaic from House of the Faun in Pompeii, currently on display at MANN.

==== Foot companions (phalangites) ====
However, the true creator of a distinctively Macedonian infantry was Philip II, considered the inventor of the Macedonian phalanx: a particularly effective heavy infantry formation. The individual phalangite was equipped with slightly lighter defensive equipment than the traditional Greek hoplite. The shield was smaller, less dished and was rimless, Heavy cuirasses were replaced by a lighter armour, called the kotthybos. The doru (δόρυ) spear of the hoplite was replaced by the much longer sarissa, a type of pike (5.5 m or 18 ft), that required both hands to wield it, hence the larger, rimmed, hoplite shield (Argive shield) could not be employed.

A typical Macedonian battle formation.

The length of the sarissa allowed an increase the number of files of infantrymen that could be actively engaged in combat, as the spearpoints of a number of ranks (at least five) projected beyond the men of the front rank in the formation. The sarissa consisted of a shaft tapered towards the spearpoint to aid balance and allow it to be held closer to its base. It was heavy (5.6 kg or 12 lb) hence being a double-handed weapon. It also had a fluted metal counterweight at the butt end, called the sauroter, which also improved its balance.

The sarissa was particularly effective in breaking cavalry charges or in halting enemy phalanxes. But the Macedonian phalanx was also fearsome in offensive use. The principle was to create a steady momentum, employing a controlled, close-order advance, so that the impact of the massed pikes would be as devastating as possible. To this end, the Macedonian phalangites fought in a deep formation of 16 files, so tightly packed that they maintained maximum cohesion. The relative lightness of their defensive equipment allowed the heavy sarissa to be used without excessive fatigue. The effectiveness of the Macedonian phalanx was reliant on the highest levels of training in weapon use, cohesion, manoeuvring as a body and the smooth transition between the 'open order', used in manoeuvring, and the 'closed order' used in combat.

To provide a measure of protection from missiles, the sarissas were raised to the vertical during an advance—they formed a hedge-like barrier — they were lowered by the front ranks to the horizontal fighting position at the last moment.

Outside the tight formation of the phalanx, the sarissa was unwieldy during marches and, therefore, it was divided into two parts that were united by an iron sleeve before combat. It should be stressed that the archaeological discoveries show that the phalangites also used the traditional Greek hoplite spear, which was much shorter than the sarissa. The sources also indicate that the phalangites were on occasion armed with javelins. The sarissa would have been useless in siege warfare and other combat situations requiring a less cumbersome weapon.

==== Hypaspists ====
The Hypaspists (hypaspistai) were the elite arm of the Macedonian infantry. The word 'hypaspists' translates into English as 'shield-bearers'. During a pitched battle, such as Gaugamela, they acted as guard for the right flank of the phalanx and as a flexible link between the phalanx and the Companion cavalry. They were used for a variety of irregular missions by Alexander, often in conjunction with the Agrianians (elite skirmishers), the Companions and select units of phalangites. They were prominent in accounts of Alexander's siege assaults in close proximity to Alexander himself. The hypaspists were Macedonians and their senior chiliarchy (χιλιαρχία) formed the agema foot bodyguard of Alexander III.

The organisation of the hypaspist regiment seems to have been into units of 500 (pentakosiarchies) before 331 and later, by 327, it was divided into three battalions (chiliarchies) of 1,000 men, which were then further sub-divided in a manner similar to the Foot Companions. Each battalion would be commanded by a chiliarch, with the regiment as a whole under the command of an archihypaspist.

In terms of weaponry, they were probably equipped in the style of a traditional Greek hoplite with a thrusting spear or doru (shorter and less unwieldy than the sarissa) and the typical large round hoplite (Argive) shield.

==== Greek hoplites ====
The army led by Alexander the Great into the Persian Empire included Greek heavy infantry in the form of allied contingents provided by the League of Corinth and hired mercenaries. These infantrymen would have been equipped as hoplites with the traditional hoplite panoply. In appearance, they would have been almost identical to the hypaspists.

=== Cavalry ===
==== Macedonian ====
The second main element of the Macedonian army was the heavy cavalry recruited among the Macedonian nobility, called the Companion cavalry or Hetairoi (Ἑταῖροι). It consisted of 3,000 heavy, shock-capable cavalry, at the beginning of Alexander's campaigns, of which 1,800 accompanied him in Asia. It was divided into 12 squadrons, the first being the Royal Squadron (basilikè ilè). This squadron, also known as the άγεμα, agêma, 'that which leads', was 300 strong, while the other squadrons consisted of 250 lancers. "It is known that the Companion cavalry at Gaugamela were formed in eight squadrons or ilai (Arr. iii I 1.8), of which, one was the royal squadron par excellence, the agêma of the Companions." The Companion cavalry were the elite arm of the Macedonian army, and were the offensive force that made the decisive attack in most of the battles of Alexander the Great. They were unmatched in the pre-stirrup Ancient world in their ability to retain their seat and the control of their weapons through the impact of a charge.

The tactical formation of the Companions was the wedge, adopted by Philip II from the Scythians. The squadron commander was at the point of this triangular formation. The formation was very manoeuvrable, with the squadron following its leader at the apex, "like a flight of cranes".

The primary weapon of the Macedonian cavalry was the xyston, a double ended cornel-wood lance, with a sword as a secondary weapon. From descriptions of combat, it would appear that once in melee the Companion cavalryman used his lance to thrust at the chests and faces of the enemy. It is possible that the lance was aimed at the upper body of an opposing cavalryman in the expectation that a blow which did not wound or kill might have sufficient leverage to unseat. If the lance broke, the Companion could reverse it and use the other end, or draw his sword. Cleitus, an officer of the Companions, saved Alexander the Great's life at the Granicus by cutting off an enemy horseman's arm with his sword. Companion cavalrymen would normally have worn armour and a helmet in battle.

==== Thessalian ====
Alexander was Archon of the Thessalian League; the Thessalians provided a large force of heavy cavalry for the invasion of Persia, whose numbers, prowess and equipment were essentially identical to those of the Macedonian Companion cavalry. The Thessalians were considered the finest cavalry of Greece.

=== Light troops ===
Light troops, both infantry and cavalry, had important roles in Macedonian tactics. Light cavalry were often armed with javelins, though after Gaugamela many Asiatic horse-archers were added to Alexander's army. Light infantry were split between javelineers, called peltasts, and archers, slingers are also recorded. Light troops performed scouting and screening duties when the army was on the march. Their mobility meant that they often formed part of any force detached from the main army and were prominent in any force that needed to move swiftly. In battle their primary duty was to secure the flanks of the Macedonian army and to counter similar enemy troops. However, Macedonian light troops were sometimes pitted against enemy heavy infantry, heavy cavalry and even elephants, and acquitted themselves remarkably well.

=== Numbers ===
Alexander's army, when embarking on his conquest of Persia, consisted of 12,000 Macedonian infantrymen, divided into phalangites and hypaspists. The hypaspists operated to the left of the Companion cavalry and acted as a flexible connection with the phalanx. Greek allies provided 7,000 troops (mostly hoplites), 7,000 Odrysian, Triballian and other Balkan tribal levies, 1,000 light infantry (Agrianian peltasts, and archers) and 5,000 mercenaries (mostly Greek hoplites). There were 1,800 Macedonian cavalry, 1,800 Thessalian heavy cavalry and 1,500 other cavalry. Additionally, an advanced guard, of around 12,000 troops, was already in Anatolia; making totals of 43,000 infantry and 6,100 cavalry.

== Grand strategy ==
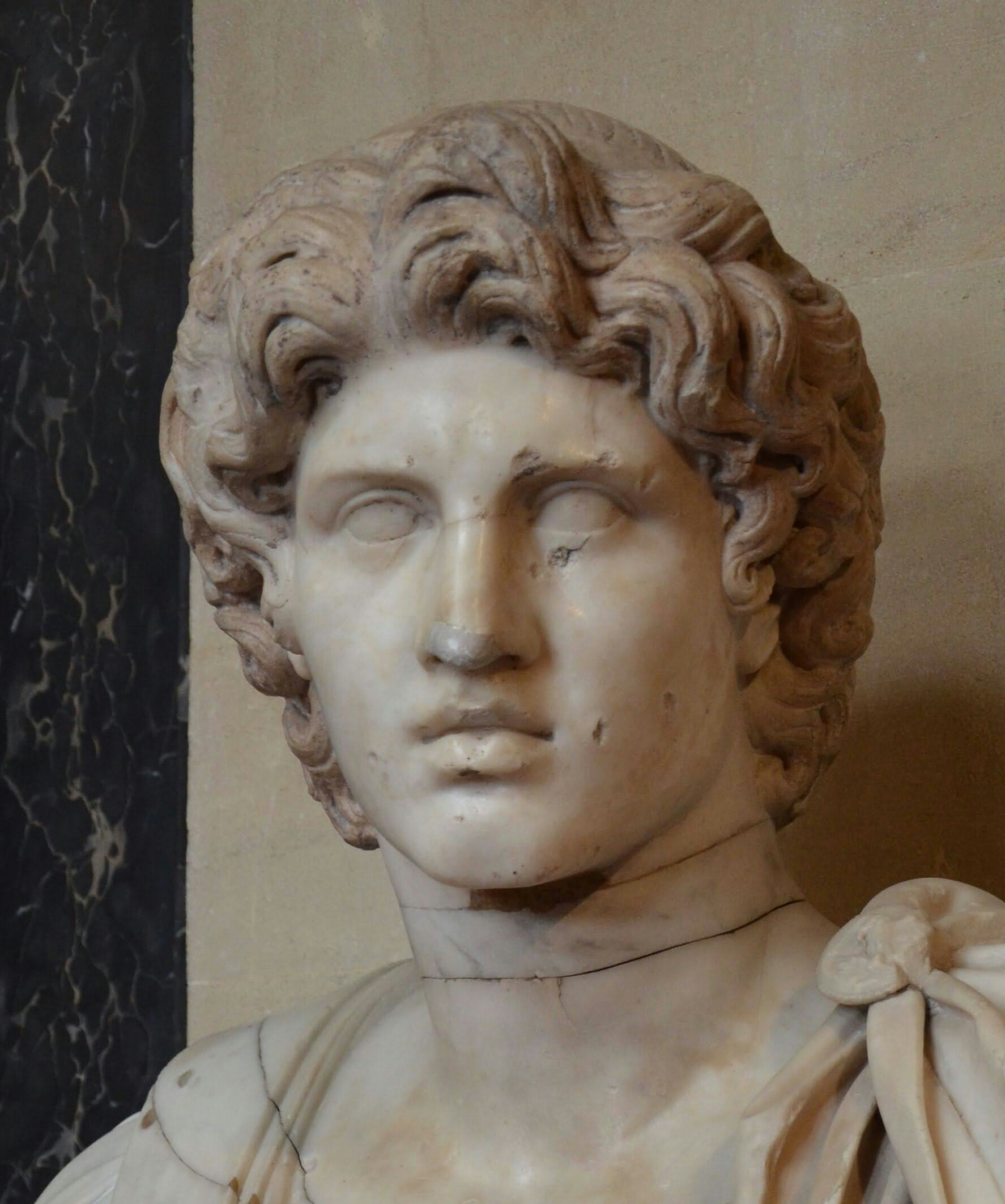
Roman bust of Alexander the Great, excavated at Herculaneum

In his book Strategy, Soviet military officer and theorist Alexander Svechin states that any offensive operation, by its very nature leads the attackers away from their base, stretches their communication, and places them under threat of attack in their turn. On the other hand, the enemy being attacked and retreating deep into his own country's territory finds his troops in a very favourable communication situation, as far as safety, convenience, and supply logistics are concerned. Svechin underlines the "basic precondition" for any operation but particularly offensive operations is to place one's troops in the most favourable "communication situation." He offers the precedent of Alexander the Great's invasion of Asia as resolving the problem of operations deep into enemy territory in an "exemplary manner."

Alexander first secured his dominance of Greece by subduing all political and military opposition: In 336 BC, Alexander's army, after marching 240 miles (390 km) from Pelion, (Note: Near modern Korçë, Albania) to Thebes, razed the city to the ground, and massacred some six thousand inhabitants, sparing only temples and Pindar’s house. All the survivors were sold into slavery. The severity of Alexander's wrath cowed all other Greek city-states into submission. Alexander left garrisons in Corinth, Chalcis, and the citadel of Thebes, Cadmea, and commenced preparations for his attack on Persia.

As long as the Greek cities in western Anatolia provided bases for the Persian fleet and the forces of Memnon of Rhodes, the most skilful general of Darius III, King of Persia, the invasion of the interior of the Persian Empire could not be undertaken. Additionally, freeing the Anatolian Greeks from the 'Persian yoke' was a stated aim of the League of Corinth, of which the King of Macedon was hegemon. Therefore, Alexander engaged in a campaign to secure all these cities, which he achieved in a relatively short time. However, he still refrained from campaigning into the hinterland of Persia. The strategy of the king was shaped by the dominance of the Persian fleet in the Mediterranean Sea, which was almost entirely dependant on the navies of the Persian-controlled Phoenician and Greek maritime cities. The Macedonians lacked a strong enough fleet to defeat the Persians at sea, therefore the need to eliminate that threat led Alexander to a larger campaign that achieved the conquest of the entirety of the Persian-dominated coastlines of Asia and Africa. Thus eliminating places where the Persian fleet could find a base and supplies. In so doing, Alexander captured the cities that provided the ships and crews for the Persian fleet, converting them into a Macedonian naval asset. Alexander's conquest of the maritime cities of Syria, Phoenicia and Palestine opened up the occupation of the wealthy Persian province of Egypt. In 332 BC, the Egyptians, whose hatred for the Persians ran deep, accepted Alexander as their lawful pharaoh."

Only then, after dedicating a long time securing his army's communication safety, through securing the Macedonians' sea-girt rear, did Alexander begin his move towards the Tigris river to confront the Persians in battle for their heartlands in Iran and Mesopotamia. The entire invasion is offered by the military theorist as a supreme example of a "strategic line" of conducting war, a line formed by "the chain of logic that connects operations into a single whole."

== General tactical approach ==
Unlike many armies of the Ancient World, such as the Roman army's reliance on the heavy infantry legionary, the Greek armies on heavy infantry hoplites and the nomadic Scythians on horse-archers, the Macedonian army was not reliant on one particularly prominent troop type. The Macedonian army perfected the co-ordination of different troop types in an early example of combined arms tactics—the heavy infantry phalanx, skirmish infantry, archers, light and heavy cavalry, and siege engines were all deployed in battle; each troop type being used to its own particular advantage and creating a synergy of mutual support. It used a variety of specialised troops to fulfil specific battlefield roles in order to form a combination that was a military machine of unparalleled effectiveness. Alexander was one of the first generals to appreciate the importance of retaining a reserve in battle. He usually retained his Companion cavalry out of combat until after the hypaspists and some units of the phalanx were in close combat, allowing him to deploy them to the greatest effect.

== Set-piece battle - hammer and anvil tactics ==
=== Principle ===
- The "anvil" was the frontal advance of the phalanx and the hypaspists (the elite infantry), they engaged and pinned the enemy infantry, holding it in place. They concentrated the attention of the enemy commander on them.
- The "hammer" was the charge of the Companion cavalry (heavy, 'shock- capable' cavalry), led by Alexander in person, which made the decisive breakthrough once the enemy ranks showed signs of disruption. The Companion cavalry squadrons were deployed in a wedge formation, which facilitated both manoeuvrability and the shock of the charge. The advantage of the wedge was that it offered a narrow point for piercing enemy formations and concentrated the leaders at its apex.

=== Phase 1: "The anvil" ===
The phalanx and hypaspists advance to engage the enemy infantry centre, to pin it in place. This causes casualties, disruption and threatens to 'steamroller' through the enemy ranks. It was usual practice for the Macedonian phalanx to advance in echelon with its left refused (held back). This tempted the enemy to respond by pushing their right forward to comply, hence increasing the possibility of them becoming disorganised or for gaps to appear between units.

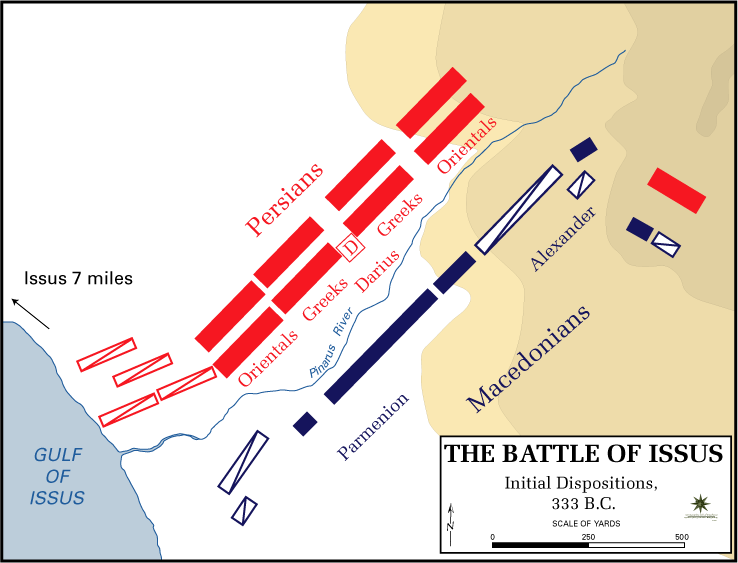
The battlefield at Issus. Initial dispositions. The phalanx will advance to engage the Persian infantry frontally - the 'anvil'

=== Phase 2: "The hammer" ===
Alexander scans the enemy front, looking for any gap or disorganisation in their ranks. Once this is noted, leading from the front, he heads the Companion cavalry in a decisive charge at this point. As the Companions penetrate the enemy ranks they 'explode laterally', rolling up the enemy infantry, or break through completely and attack the enemy from their rear. Once a breakthrough is made, the hypaspists and nearby phalangites move in to exploit it.

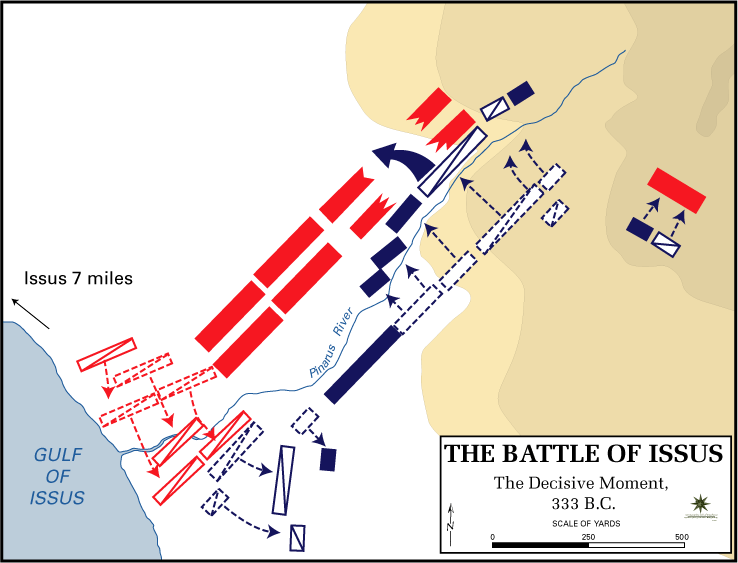
Alexander's decisive attack The Companion cavalry pierce the enemy's front at a point of weakness - the 'hammer'

Alexander relies on his Thessalian heavy cavalry and various units of light cavalry to engage and hold off the enemy cavalry, aided by units of light infantry (peltasts and archers).

== Tactics at the Battle of Gaugamela ==
The Battle of Gaugamela was the decisive confrontation between Alexander's army and that of Darius III (October 1, 331 BC). It is also known as the Battle of Arbela, due to its relative proximity (100 km or 60 mi) to the city of Arbela, today's Erbil, in northern Iraq.

The "hammer" and "anvil" tactic, which was the key to Alexander's victories was again employed. However, the particular circumstances of the battle imposed on Alexander the need to form his army up in an innovative manner. An army formation that would allow his usual battle winning tactics to be employed.

=== Number of troops ===
Alexander the Great had an army of 47,000 men. This was considerably smaller than that of Darius—who according to modern historians assembled between 50,000 and 120,000 soldiers, the maximum figure is constrained by contemporary limits on food and animal fodder supply.

=== Battle ===
==== Initial dispositions ====
Alexander was acutely aware of the threat posed by the very large and capable Persian cavalry force to his flanks and rear. He realised that his smaller army, with its relatively smaller proportion of cavalry, would be outflanked. The Persians had around 34,000 cavalry, the Macedonians only 7,250. Alexander decided to arrange his troops in a hollow box formation (tactical square), something completely innovative, making it almost immune to flanking attack. He placed his hypaspists, Macedonian phalanx, Companion and Thessalian heavy cavalry on his front, with both wings, composed of cavalry and light infantry, echeloned to the rear. To complete the box was a rear phalanx composed of allied and mercenary Greek hoplites. Alexander took personal command of the Companion cavalry (hetairoi).

The Persians were arrayed on a broad front with a rear line made up of numerous, but poor quality, levy infantry. In the front line, the centre was composed of alternate units of elite cavalry and infantry units, including the Persian royal foot and horse guards and Greek mercenary hoplites, the flanks of the front line were composed solely of cavalry. In front of all were groups of scythed chariots, with which the Persians hoped to disrupt the Macedonian infantry. They proved a disappointment. Darius was positioned in the centre of his front line surrounded by the infantry and cavalry of the Persian Royal Guard. The Persians fielded a small number of war elephants, but they had no discernible effect on the course of the battle.

Alexander intended his right-centre to advance to attack the Persian centre, the Macedonian left-centre, commanded by Parmenion, was to hold back, in echelon, and take a more defensive stance, their task to hold off the strong cavalry force on the Persian right. The flanking units and rear phalanx were also intended to be largely on the defensive. The Persians had cleared their intended battlefield of any obstacles which might impede the attack of their chariots. Before contact, Alexander caused his whole formation to drift, left to right, across the Persian frontage, forcing the Persians to attack before the Macedonian army exited the prepared ground.

Figure - The Battle of Gaugamela - initial dispositions - Macedonians red/black, Persians blue/white (missile infantry in skirmish order not shown) Adapted from the battle plans appearing in: Green, p. 291, Devine, pp. 376-377 and Warry, p. 81.

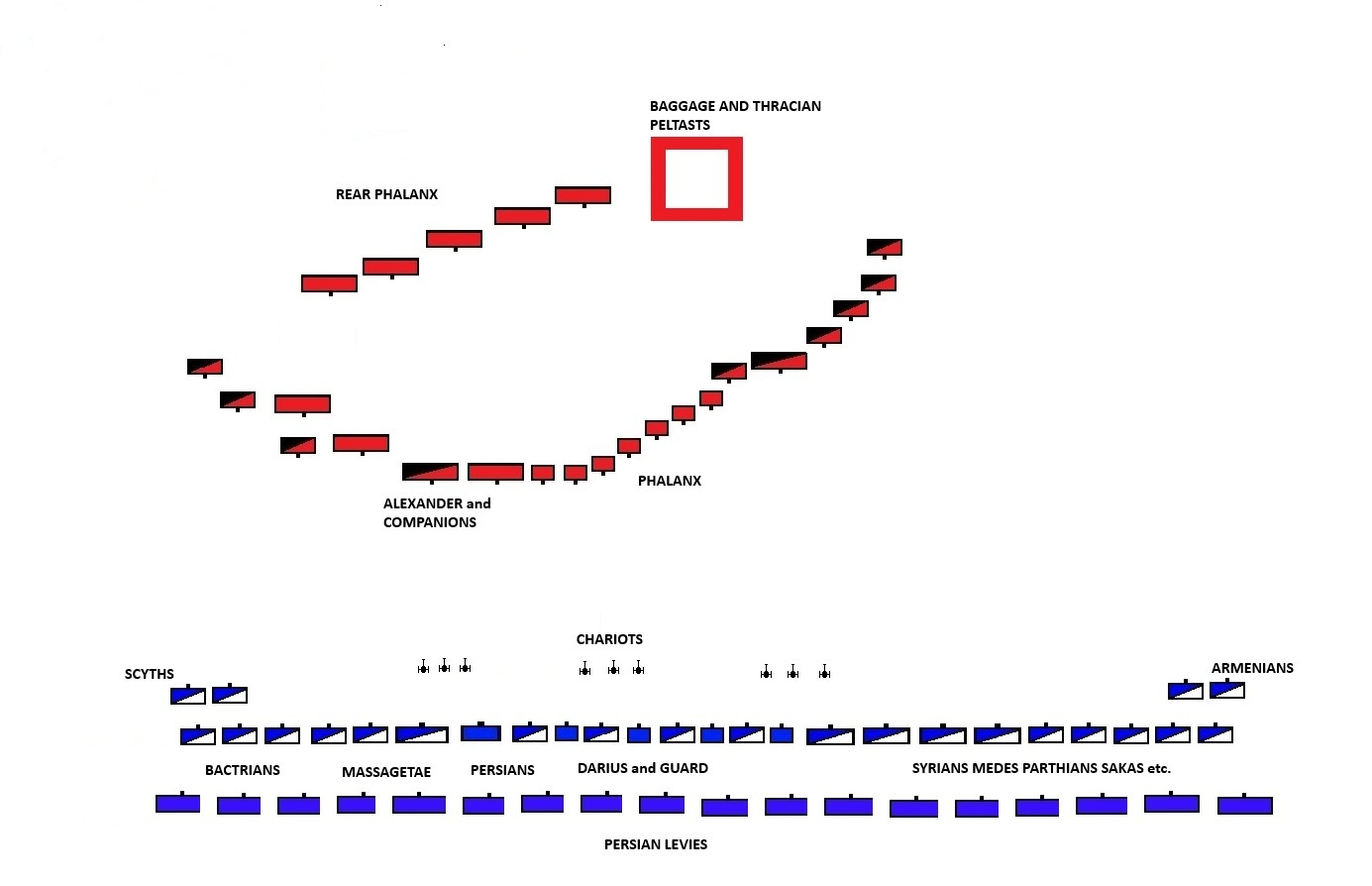
The Battle of Gaugamela, initial dispositions

==== Persian attacks ====
To stop the Macedonian army drifting beyond the prepared battlefield, Darius ordered his left wing cavalry, under Bessus, to attack the Macedonian right and bring it to a halt. The Macedonian cavalry was forced back but was bolstered by the Paionian cavalry, under Ariston, plus Agrianian peltasts and archers. At this time, the Macedonian right wing cavalry, only 1,100 strong, was holding against approximately ten times their numbers. The charge of the Persian chariots against the Macedonian infantry was disrupted by missile troops and nullified by the phalangites opening ranks, so that the chariots could pass through them, doing little damage. The chariots that made it into the centre of the box were destroyed by the grooms and other army servants. The very strong force of cavalry on the Persian right wing was also committed to battle, attacking the Macedonian left, under Parmenion.

==== The development of the battle ====
With both flanks holding, if under enormous pressure, and all the effective enemy troops committed to the fray, Alexander ordered his centre to advance against the Persian centre. The advance was in oblique order with the left refused (held back in echelon). The hypaspists and the rightmost elements of the Macedonian phalanx attacked the Persian centre, pinning it in place (anvil). At the junction between the Persian left and centre, now both in action, the need to keep an unbroken front led to a thinning of the ranks in this sector. Alexander seized this opportunity to launch his squadrons of Companion cavalry at the weak spot (hammer). At much the same time as Alexander's charge, the sarissophoroi under Aretes were responsible for routing the Persian left wing cavalry, winning the battle in this sector. In their final charge they broke the Massagetae heavy cavalry, Aretes personally killing their leader. However, the Macedonian left were not faring as well and were under huge pressure. During the Macedonian advance a gap had opened up between two units of the phalanx, and two Persian cavalry formations had broken through. Instead of attacking the phalanx from its vulnerable rear, they rode towards the Macedonian baggage train. There they were repulsed, after some plundering, by the Thracian peltasts, who were guarding the baggage, and hoplites drawn from the rear phalanx.

Figure - The Battle of Gaugamela - the decisive phase

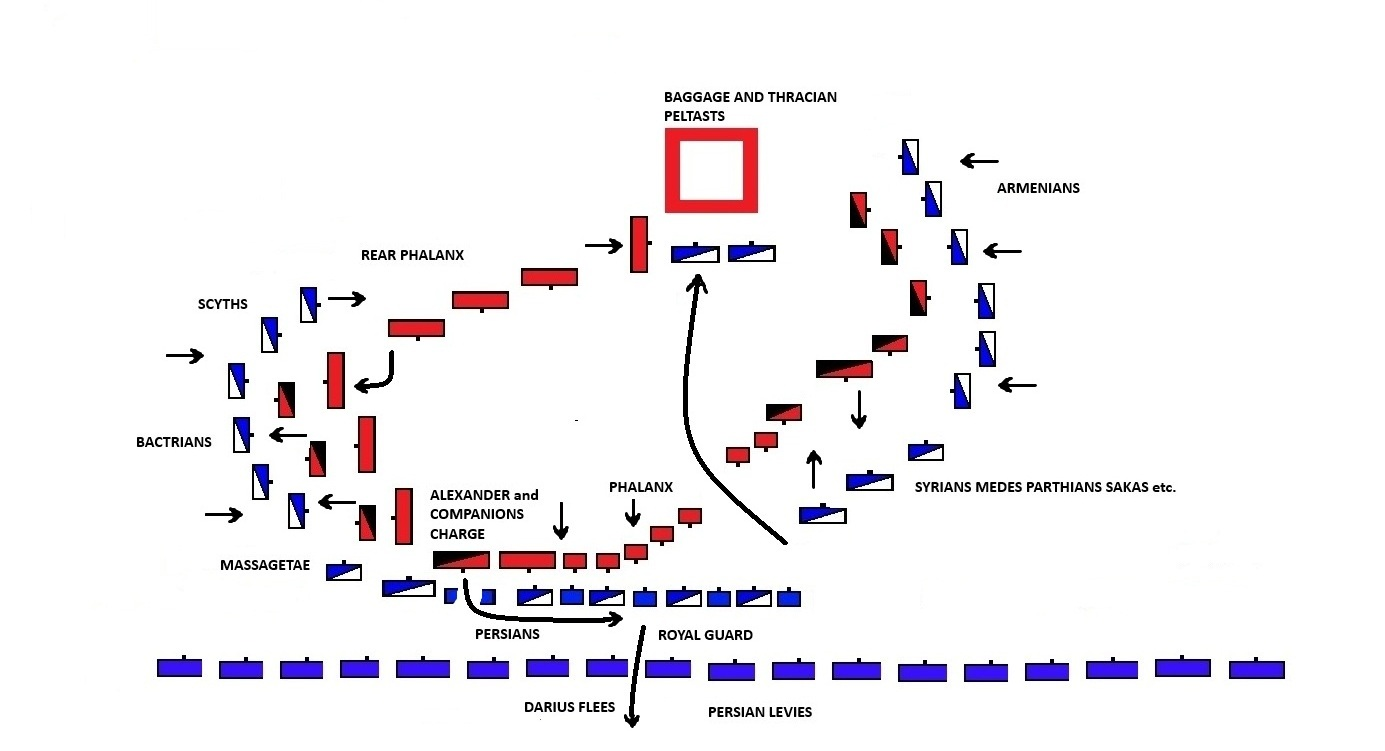
The Battle of Gaugamela - the decisive phase

==== The charge of the Companion cavalry ====
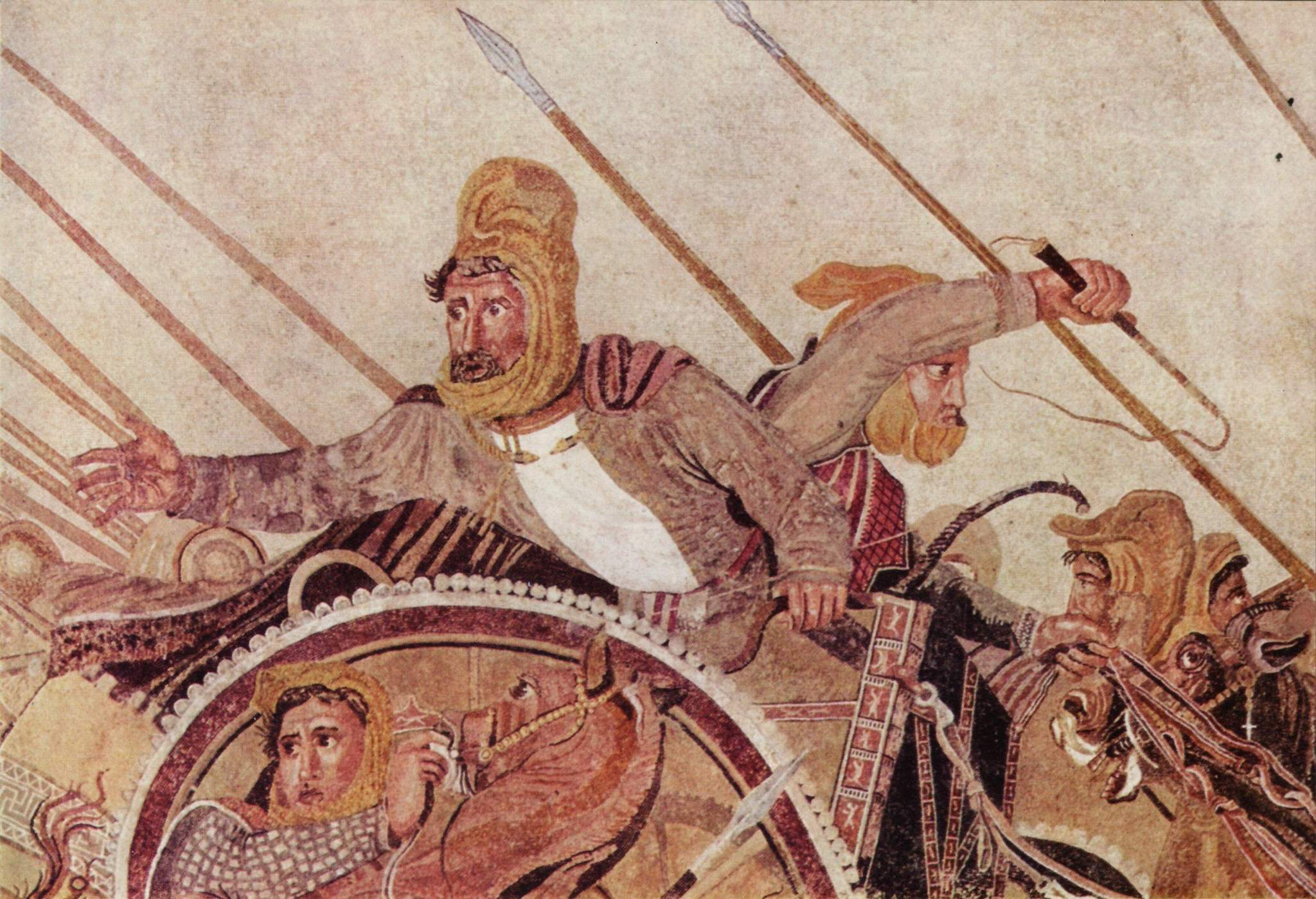
The moment Darius III panics and turns to flight. Detail from the Alexander Mosaic, Roman copy of Hellenistic original

Alexander led the charge of the Companion cavalry, riding at the apex of the wedge formation of the agema, his royal squadron. The Companions, with the hypaspists on their left struck the weak section of the Persian line and broke into and through it. With assistance from elements of the phalanx, they rolled up the Persian ranks, heading for Darius and his guards. The Macedonians engaged the Persian guard cavalry and the Greek hoplites in Persian pay. These Persian units were fighting back fiercely, when Darius decided to flee the field. This ended organised resistance in the Persian centre. At this time Alexander received a message from Parmenion that the Macedonian left was on the point of defeat and collapse. Abandoning the immediate pursuit of Darius, Alexander led the troops around him to succour his hard-pressed left. Darius' loss of nerve and precipitate withdrawal proved decisive, with the entire Persian army losing cohesion and its troops looking only to escape. The course of the battle perfectly illustrated the advantages of Alexander's innovative tactics.

==== Darius' flight ====
As happened during the Battle of Issus, Alexander almost captured Darius. The Persian troops fled the battlefield with their surviving leaders. Darius joined up with some of his guard and the Bactrian cavalry. Alexander and his troops pursued them over great distances, far into Iran. Eventually, Bessus deposed Darius, put him in chains and proclaimed himself Great King, under the name Artaxerxes V. With Alexander approaching at speed, Darius refused to abandon his carriage and mount a horse to escape, regarding it as being beneath his dignity, he was then mortally wounded by the javelin thrusts of Bessus and his leading supporters.

In the immediate aftermath of the battle, Alexander was acclaimed as 'Lord of Asia', by his troops.

== Siege tactics ==
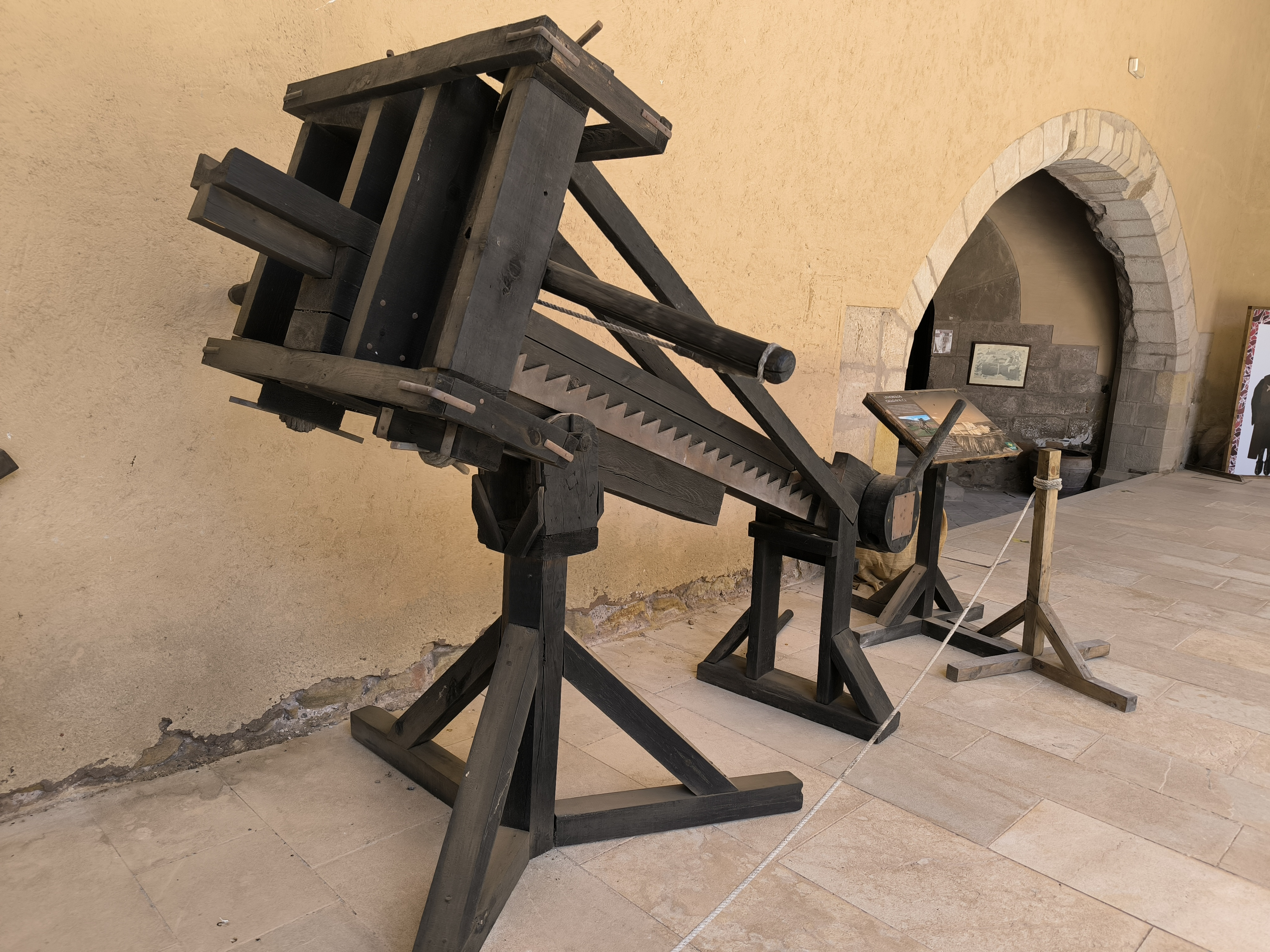
Reproduction of a Lithobolos in the castle of Mora de Rubielos

Until the late 5th century BC, sieges in the Greek world were almost entirely based on blockade. The blockade was a passive strategy, meant to stop supplies entering the besieged city in order to starve the population and garrison into surrender. A blockade could include circumvallation, building a wall and other defensive structures around a city to protect the besieging army and ensure no supplies or reinforcements could enter. If a besieged city was located on the coast, the blockade would also necessarily include a naval blockade. The first evidence of active siege tactics being used by Greeks was during the Peloponnesian War, when the Spartans constructed timber-reinforced mounds against the city walls of Plataea, in 429 BC, to enable Spartan soldiers to attack the parapets from the same height. The Spartans also employed battering rams. However, these stratagems were ineffective and the circumvallation and blockade approach had to be resorted to. The Plataeans resisted the siege for two years.

A revolution in Greek siege warfare was sponsored by Dionysius I of Syracuse, who created a forerunner of schools of military engineering. The major products of which were improved artillery, in the form of large versions of the crossbow-like gastraphetes called oxybelai (c. 399 BC) and huge, mobile siege towers, six stories tall, that moved on wheels. Such a movable siege tower was known as a helepolis, a 'city-taker', they were often covered in metal sheathing, or wet animal hides, to protect their wooden structure from incendiary weapons. They had multiple ports, with hinged covers, for mounting artillery.

Around 350 BC a very major improvement in the power of artillery occurred, quite probably under the patronage of Alexander the Great's father, Philip II. This saw the replacement of reliance on the elastic properties of a bow-stave by the use of bow arms inserted into vertical springs made of twisted skeins of hair or sinew, held in a frame. These torsion-powered catapults were far more powerful and had a longer range than their bow-stave predecessors. They could be constructed to shoot arrow-like bolts or stones. Of identical design, they could be made to various scales, from small, anti-personnel, bolt-shooters to large stone-shooters (lithoboloi), capable of battering city walls. Alexander was heir to all these developments in siege warfare.

=== Siege of Tyre ===
The siege of Tyre was probably the longest and most arduous military undertaking of Alexander the Great's career.

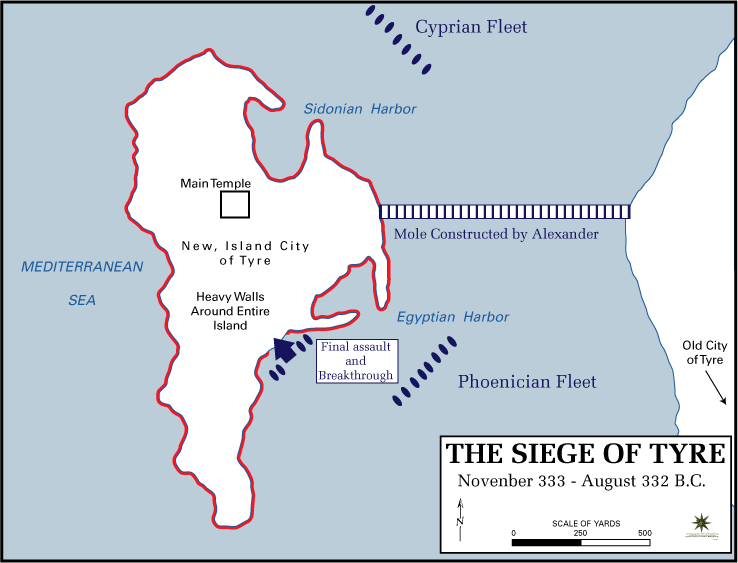

==== Background ====
Following his victory at the Battle of Issus, Alexander led his troops southward down the coast of the Levant. During this march the cities of the coast acknowledged his suzerainty, opening their gates to his troops. Of the wealthy city states of Phoenicia, only Tyre temporised. The Tyrians said that they accepted Macedonian authority, but refused to allow any Macedonians entry to their city. Alexander could not allow a strong, uncommitted, port-city to remain in his rear, which could be used as a base for fleets loyal to Persia. Tyre was located on an island just offshore and was very strongly fortified. Centuries previously, Tyre withstood an Assyrian siege for 13 years. Nevertheless, Alexander determined that it would have to be taken by force. The Tyrians roused Alexander's wrath by committing a senseless breach of convention, they killed heralds sent into the city to negotiate and threw their bodies off the battlements. This ensured Macedonian determination to take Tyre.

==== Siege ====
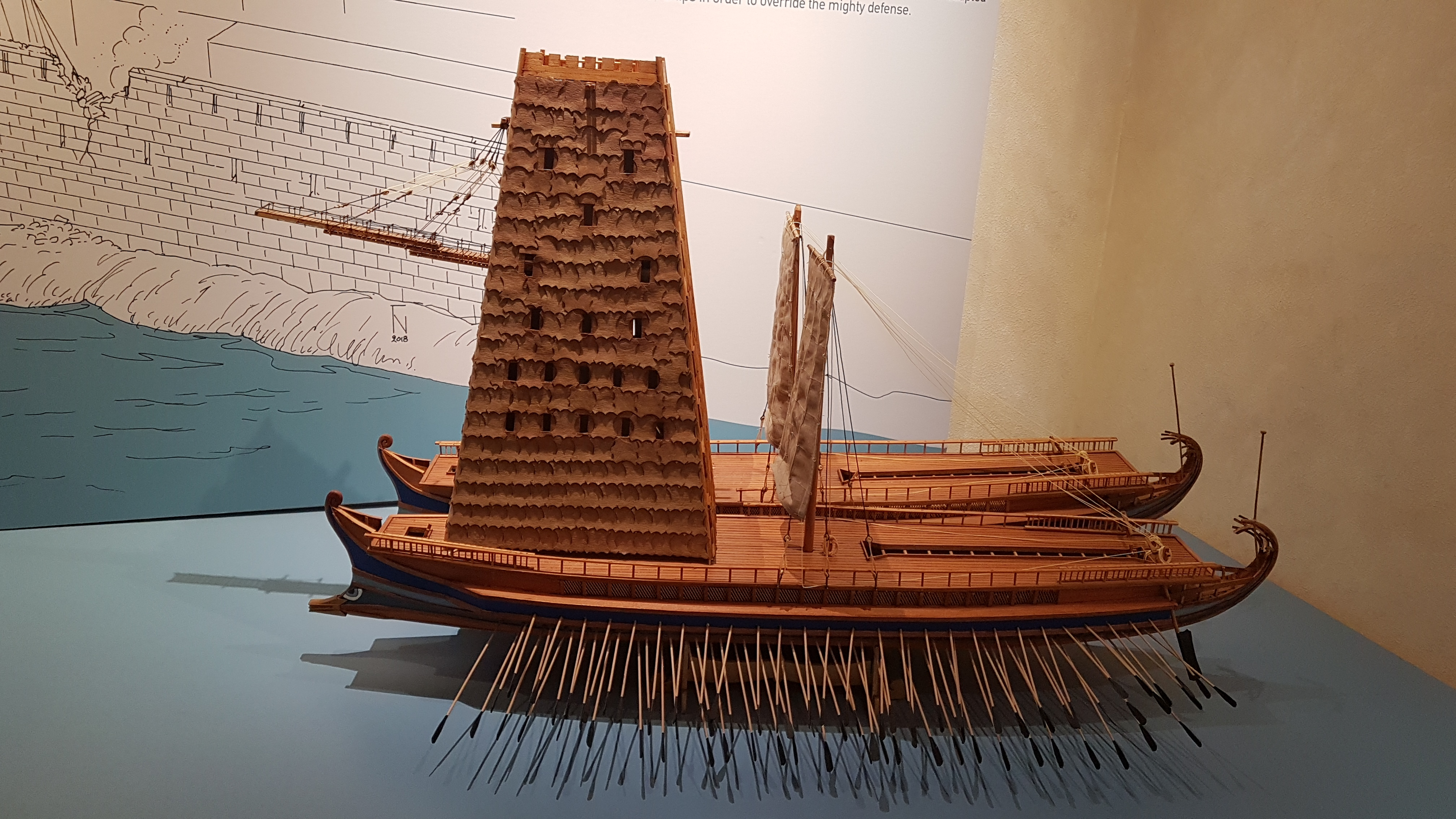
Two quinqueremes, joined beam to beam with a helepolis mounted across their decks. At Tyre Alexander used the same technique to mount floating battering rams. Modern model

Initially, the Macedonians had very few ships available, which constrained their choice of tactics, as the Tyrians possessed a capable fleet that could intercept any attack by water. Alexander had the mainland settlement of Old Tyre demolished to provide material for the construction of a causeway to run out from the shore to the island of Tyre. As the causeway reached deeper water its extension became more laborious. Eventually the head of the causeway came under fire from artillery mounted on the walls of the city and Tyrian vessels. Alexander had two helepolis siege towers constructed to protect the end of the causeway and to mount artillery to reply to that of the Tyrians. The towers were eventually burnt through the deployment of fireships. Alexander replied by widening the head of the causeway and bringing up new towers. However, the Tyrians responded by building their own wooden towers above their already tall battlements.

The siege appeared to be becoming a stalemate, when an invaluable reinforcement arrived. Major elements of the Persian fleet became aware that their home cities had fallen under Macedonian control, as a result the Phoenician squadrons abandoned their allegiance and sailed for Tyre. The kingdoms of Cyprus, alert to the shift of power from the Persians to the Macedonians, also sent a large naval contingent. Both naval forces placed themselves at Alexander's disposal. Alexander now had a preponderance of naval strength. The Tyrians threw large stones into the water at the base of their walls, to deter enemy vessels from approaching the walls too closely. A series of combats then took place between the Macedonian ships attempting to haul the rocks away and Tyrian vessels, and divers, trying to stop them. The Macedonians eventually prevailed. After a naval sortie by the Tyrians had been defeated, Alexander tested the defences of the city from the sea. He employed vessels equipped with large, stone-shooting artillery, to attack at the city walls, aided by battering rams mounted on pairs of vessels lashed together. The city's northern defenses proved too strong, but at the southern walls a breach was made. After an initial assault was repulsed, the breach in the wall was widened, then the Macedonians, spearheaded by the hypaspitai under Admetus, gained a foothold. Admetus was killed, but Alexander took over, leading his men in clearing the breach of defenders. Reinforcements allowed Alexander's troops to pour into the city, where the defenders continued a desperate resistance, but to no avail. King Azimilik and other notables took refuge in the temple of Melkart, these were spared (possibly because Melkart was equated with Herakles, a legendary ancestor of Alexander). To celebrate his victory, Alexander made a sacrifice to Herakles in the temple of Melkart. Two thousand men of military age were crucified, while the survivors, 30,000 in number, were sold into slavery.

== Overview ==
From his own time to the present there has been little doubt expressed in the writings of historians that Alexander III of Macedon exhibited generalship and military genius of a high order. His abilities were predicated on, and made possible by, the work of his father and predecessor, Philip II. Philip created the army his son wielded so expertly. Philip made the Macedonian state and army into one entity. The army was the state, the commander in chief of the army and the king were the same person. Philip perfected the tactical, organisational and military equipment innovations made within the Greek world in the decades before his rise to power, and added some of his own devising. These Alexander inherited and it was his father's legacy that allowed his conquest of the Persian Empire. Alexander's campaign from the Hellespont to the Indus was the longest-distance of any single recorded military campaign up to that time. Alexander won four major pitched battles, numerous sieges and dozens of smaller-scale engagements, all with a casualty rate to his own army that never threatened its military effectiveness. He moved his army with a speed that often alarmed and discomfited his foes. In addition to being a highly skilled tactician, he was a master of logistics. Alexander combined speed of movement with a gift for tactical improvisation. He exhibited strategic flexibility, a mastery of using terrain to his advantage, an unperturbably cool-head in a crisis, and an unerring psychological insight into the intentions of his enemies. In all, he was probably the most incomparable general in history.

== See also ==
- Alexander the Great
- Ancient Macedonian army
- Chronology of European exploration of Asia

== Bibliography ==
- Ashley, J.R. (2004) The Macedonian Empire: The Era of Warfare Under Philip II and Alexander the Great, 359-323 B.C. McFarland.
- Billows, R.A. (2023) Antigonos the One-Eyed and the Creation of the Hellenistic State, University of California Press, Berkeley.
- Bloedow, E.F. (2004) "Egypt in Alexander's Scheme of Things", in Quaderni Urbinati di Cultura Classica, New Series, Vol. 77, No. 2 (2004), Fabrizio Serra Editore, pp. 75–99
- Brunt, P. A. (1963) "Alexander's Macedonian cavalry" in JHS 83.
- Burke, E.M. (1983) "Philip II and Alexander the Great," Military Affairs, Vol. 47, No. 2 (Apr., 1983), pp. 67–70.
- Bury, J.B., (1913) A History of Greece to the Death of Alexander. London.
- Campbell, B. and Lawrence, A. (ed.s) (2013) The Oxford Handbook of Warfare in the Classical World, Oxford University Press.
- Heckel, W. and Jones, R. (2006) Macedonian Warrior Alexander's elite infantryman, Osprey. ISBN 978-1-84176-950-9.
- Connolly, P. (1981) Greece and Rome at War. Macdonald Phoebus, London. ISBN 1-85367-303-X
- Devine, A.M. (1975), "Grand Tactics at Gaugamela", Phoenix, Vol. 29, No. 4 (Winter, 1975), Classical Association of Canada, pp. 374–385
- Ellis, J. R., "Alexander's hypaspists again in Historia 24, 1975.
- Gaebel, R.E, (2004) Cavalry Operations in the Ancient Greek World, University of Oklahoma Press
- Green, P. (1992), Alexander of Macedon: 356–323 B.C. A Historical Biography, University of California Press. ISBN 0-520-07166-2.
- Lendon, J.E. (2006) Soldiers and Ghosts: A History of Battle in Classical Antiquity, Yale University Press.
- Markle, M.M. (1982) "Macedonian Arms and Tactics under Alexander the Great", Studies in the History of Art, Vol 10, Symposium Series I: Macedonia and Greece in Late Classical and Early Hellenistic Times, pp. 86–111. National Gallery of Art.
- Sidnell, P. (2006) Warhorse: Cavalry in Ancient Warfare, Continuum, London.
- Warry, J. (1980) Warfare in the Classical World, Salamander Books, London. ISBN 0-86101-034-5
