= Amyntas (son of Arrhabaeus) =

4th-century BC Macedonian general

Amyntas (Greek: Ἀμύντας), son of Arrhabaeus, was hipparch of the ile of Prodromoi. He replaced Hegelochus and was replaced by Protomachus.
