= Protomachus (Macedonian general) =

Ancient Macedonian general

Protomachus (Ancient Greek: Πρωτόμαχος) was a Macedonian general in the Battle of Issus commanding the Prodromoi and replacing Amyntas (son of Arrhabaeus). In the battle of Gaugamela he was replaced by Aretes
