= Protomachus =

Protomachus may refer to:

- Protomachus (Athenian general)
- Protomachus (Macedonian general)
