= Karabiga =

- Municipality
- Location in Turkey Karabiga (Marmara)
- Coordinates: 40°24′13″N 27°18′14″E
- Country: Turkey
- Province: Çanakkale
- District: Biga
- Elevation: 16 m (52 ft)
- Population (2021): 2,962
- Time zone: UTC+3 (TRT)

Karabiga (Karabuga) is a town (belde) in the Biga District, Çanakkale Province, Turkey. Its population is 2,962 (2021). It is located at the mouth of the Biga River, on a small east-facing bay, known as Karabiga Bay. Its ancient name was Priapus or Priapos (Ancient Greek: Πρίαπος).

== History ==
Originally a town of ancient Mysia, it was a colony of Miletus or of Cyzicus. It had a good harbour. Strabo mentions that the area produced fine wine and that the god Priapus gave the town its ancient name. Thucydides mentions the town as a naval station. Arrian reports that in 334 BCE Alexander the Great sent Panegorus to take possession of the city and the city surrendered without contest, prior to the Battle of Granicus. Besides the aforementioned authors, the town was noted by numerous ancient writers and geographers including Pomponius Mela, Pliny the Elder, Stephanus of Byzantium, and the Geographer of Ravenna.

Under the Eastern Roman Empire, the town was known as Pegae or Pegai (Πηγαί) and was the site of a Byzantine fortress.

During the Allied occupation following World War I, Karabiga was part of the lands that were claimed by Anzavur Ahmed Pasha in his attempt to keep the area from the Turkish nationalists. He was killed just outside Karabiga in April 1921 by Turkish nationalists aligned with Arnavud Rahman.
