= Sarissophoroi =

Type of ancient Macedonian cavalry

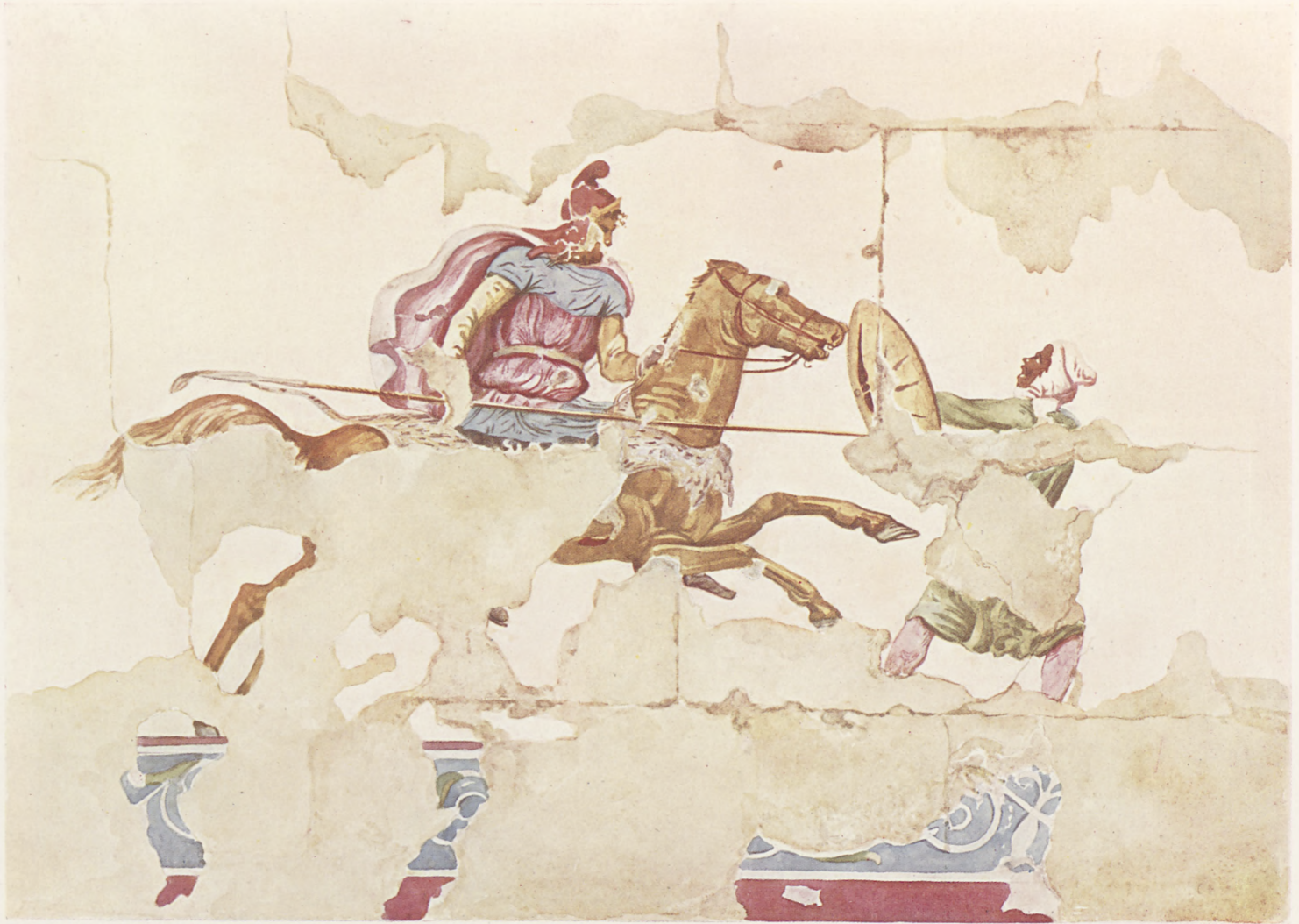
A damaged 3rd-century BCE painting of a Macedonian cavalryman wielding a spear (perhaps a sarissa or a xyston?). Found by K. F. Kinch, with the new painting of the original painting by Oscar Willerup.

The sarissophoroi (σαρισσοφόροι, sarissa bearers; singular: sarissophoros σαρισσοφόρος), also called prodromoi, were a unit of light cavalry in the ancient Macedonian army.

== Overview ==
In the primary sources Arrian mentions that the Macedonian officer Aretes commanded the prodromoi, in the same context Curtius says that Aretes commanded the sarissophoroi. It would appear that the same unit of cavalry was known by both names.

Scholarship is divided as to the ethnic composition of the sarissophoroi/prodromoi of the Macedonian army. Most authorities regard the sarissophoroi/prodromoi as being raised from Macedonians. This would parallel the composition of the Athenian prodromoi, who were raised from the thetes, the lowest census class of Athenian citizens. Nicholas Sekunda, however, gives them an origin from Thrace. Arrian usually differentiates the prodromoi of the Macedonian army from the Paeonian light cavalry, which suggests a fixed ethnic composition. This uncertainty is probably due to the lack of a definite understanding of the use of the term prodromoi by the primary sources.

== Role ==
On the battlefield, where they operated as shock-capable cavalry, the sarissophoroi wielded a weapon given the same name as the infantryman's (pezhetairos) pike, the sarissa; this was possibly in reality merely a longer version of the cavalry lance, the xyston. However, when operating ahead of the army on scouting and screening duties they carried javelins. They were amongst the most versatile of the Macedonian cavalry.

Persian light cavalry took over the bulk of scouting duties when they became available to the Macedonian army following Gaugamela. The sarissophoroi then assumed a purely battlefield role as shock cavalry. It is possible that the sarissaphoroi, due to their skill in wielding long lances and their extensive battle experience, were considered more valuable in the role of shock cavalry, especially after the departure of the Thessalian cavalry. In battle the sarissophoroi were usually placed on the outer flank of the Companion cavalry. Four ilai, each 150 strong, of sarissophoroi/prodromoi operated with Alexander's army in Asia.

At Gaugamela, the sarissophoroi under Aretes were responsible for finally routing the Persian left wing cavalry, winning the battle in this sector. In their final charge they broke the Massagetae heavy cavalry, Aretes personally killing their leader.

== Demise ==
The sarissophoroi are last mentioned in the sources in 329 BC, there is no firm evidence as to their fate. It is, however, assumed that they were absorbed into the Companion cavalry, as their role as light cavalry was adequately covered by the availability of numerous Asiatic light horsemen.

== Bibliography ==
- Ashley, J.R. (2004) The Macedonian Empire: The Era of Warfare Under Philip II and Alexander the Great, 359-323 B.C. McFarland.
- Arrian, trans Hammond, M. (2013) Alexander the Great: The Anabasis and the Indica, Oxford University Press.
- Brunt, P.A. (1963) Alexander's Macedonian Cavalry, The Journal of Hellenic Studies, Vol. 83, pp. 27–46, The Society for the Promotion of Hellenic Studies
- English, S. (2009) The Army of Alexander the Great, Pen & Sword Military
- Gaebel, R.E, (2004) Cavalry Operations in the Ancient Greek World, University of Oklahoma Press
- Sekunda, Nicholas V. (2010). "The Macedonian Army". In Roisman, Joseph; Worthington, Ian (eds.). A Companion to Ancient Macedonia. Oxford, Chichester, & Malden: Wiley-Blackwell. pp. 446–471. ISBN 978-1-4051-7936-2.
- Sidnell, Philip (2006). Warhorse. London: Hambeldon Continuum. pp. 355. ISBN 1-85285-374-3.
