= Bagophanes =

Ancient Persian military leader

Bagophanes was the Achaemenid commander of the citadel at Babylon in the 4th century BCE. He willingly surrendered it and all the royal treasures to Alexander the Great after the Battle of Gaugamela in 331 BCE, laying out a carpet of flowers and garlands for Alexander on the road. Bagophanes led a formal procession from the city to offer its surrender. Afterward, Alexander kept him in his entourage.

He was possibly a eunuch.
