= Hetairideia =

Religious festival of the ancient Macedonians

Hetaeridia or Hetairidia (Ἑταιρίδεια) was a name of a festival among Macedonians and Magnesians (Athenaeus XIII. 572, quoting Hegesander). The origin of the Thessalian Hetaeridia is said to be related to Jason, who sacrificed to Zeus Hetaereius, "Zeus of the Companions" (the Argonauts) and called the festival by this name. Athenaeus continues "and the Macedonian kings also celebrated the Hetairidia (Θύουσι δὲ καὶ οἱ Μακεδόνων βασιλεῖς τὰ ῾Εταιρίδεια)". Scholars consider the Macedonian Hetaeridia an archaic festival and related to the Hetairoi (the name of the noble aristocracy and later Companion cavalry).

== See also ==
- Hetair-, a Greek linguistic root
