= Panegorus =

Greek mythological character

Panegorus (Ancient Greek: Πανήγορος) son of Lycagoras, was a Macedonian hetairos. He was left behind with an undisclosed force to occupy the city of Priapus in Troad, which surrendered to Alexander the Great as he continued to Granicus in 334 BC.
