= Aretes =

Aretes (Greek: Ἀρέτης) or Aretas (Greek: Ἀρέτας) was a Macedonian general. At the Battle of Gaugamela, he commanded the sarissophoroi (also known as prodromoi), a unit of versatile cavalry, adept at scouting, but with an ability for close-combat in battle. He replaced Protomachus as the commander of this unit. At Gaugamela, the sarissophoroi were responsible for finally routing the Persian left wing cavalry, winning the battle in this sector. In their final charge, the sarissophoroi broke the Massagetae heavy cavalry, Aretes personally killing their leader.

== Bibliography ==
- Ashley, J.R. (2004) The Macedonian Empire: The Era of Warfare Under Philip II and Alexander the Great, 359-323 B.C. McFarland.
- Sidnell, Philip (2006). Warhorse. London: Hambeldon Continuum. pp. 355. ISBN 1-85285-374-3.
- Who's who in the age of Alexander the Great: prosopography of Alexander's empire, ISBN 978-1-4051-1210-9
