= Prodromoi =

Light cavalry unit in Ancient Greece

In ancient Greece, the prodromoi (singular: prodromos) were skirmisher light cavalry. Their name (ancient Greek: πρόδρομοι, prοdromoi, lit. "pre-cursors," "runners-before," or "runners-ahead") implies that these cavalry 'moved before the rest of the army' and were therefore intended for scouting and screening missions. They were usually equipped with javelins, and a sword. Sometimes they wore either linen or leather armour, as well as bronze helmets.

== Athenian prodromoi ==
The prodromoi of Athens were mounted javelineers, raised between 395 and 360BC as a replacement for the hippotoxotai, who were horse archers. The introduction of the prodromoi may have formed a part of the military reforms of Iphicrates. The Athenian prodromoi, were raised from the Thetes, the lowest of the four census classes of Athenian citizens. Their members were, therefore, considerably poorer than the citizens who made up the Hippeis, the heavy cavalry, who were drawn from the second census class. The cavalrymen of the hippeis provided their own equipment, the prodromoi, however, were equipped by their phylarchs. Xenophon exhorts the phylarchs to equip their prodromoi well and to drill them in the use of javelins. Circumstantial evidence suggests that this unit was 200-strong (the hippotoxotai are recorded as being 200-strong, the prodomoi, being their immediate successors, are assumed to have had the same strength). By the 3rd century there is evidence that the term prodromos was used in reference to the aides attached to cavalry officers.

== Macedonian prodromoi/sarissophoroi ==
In the Macedonian army of Philip II and Alexander the Great, the cavalry unit termed the prodromoi carried skirmishing equipment for scouting and outpost duties, however, the cavalrymen of this unit are sometimes referred to as sarissophoroi, "pikemen" or "lancers", which leads to the conclusion that they were sometimes armed with an uncommonly long xyston (believed to be 14 ft long), though certainly not an infantry pike (sarissa). They acted as scouts reconnoitring in front of the army when it was on the march. In battle, they were used in a shock role to protect the right flank of the Companion cavalry. Persian light cavalry took over scouting duties when they became available to the Macedonian army following Gaugamela; the prodromoi then assumed a purely battlefield role as shock cavalry. Four ilai, each 150 strong, of prodromoi operated with Alexander's army in Asia.

At Gaugamela, the prodromoi under Aretes were responsible for finally routing the Persian left wing cavalry, winning the battle in this sector.

In the primary sources Arrian mentions that Aretes commanded the prodromoi, in the same context Curtius says that Aretes commanded the sarissophoroi. It would appear that the same unit of cavalry was known by both names. It is possible that the term prodromoi was used in two different ways in the primary sources. Firstly, to indicate a particular unit, the prodromoi/sarissophoroi, and secondly, for cavalry of any type engaged in detached scouting duties.

== Bibliography ==
- Ashley, J.R. (2004) The Macedonian Empire: The Era of Warfare Under Philip II and Alexander the Great, 359-323 B.C. McFarland.
- Arrian, trans Hammond, M. (2013) Alexander the Great: The Anabasis and the Indica, Oxford University Press.
- Bugh, G.R. (2912) The Horsemen of Athens, Princeton University Press
- Gaebel, R.E, (2004) Cavalry Operations in the Ancient Greek World, University of Oklahoma Press
