= Battle of Gaugamela =

Major battle of the Wars of Alexander the Great (331 BC)

- Part of the Wars of Alexander the Great
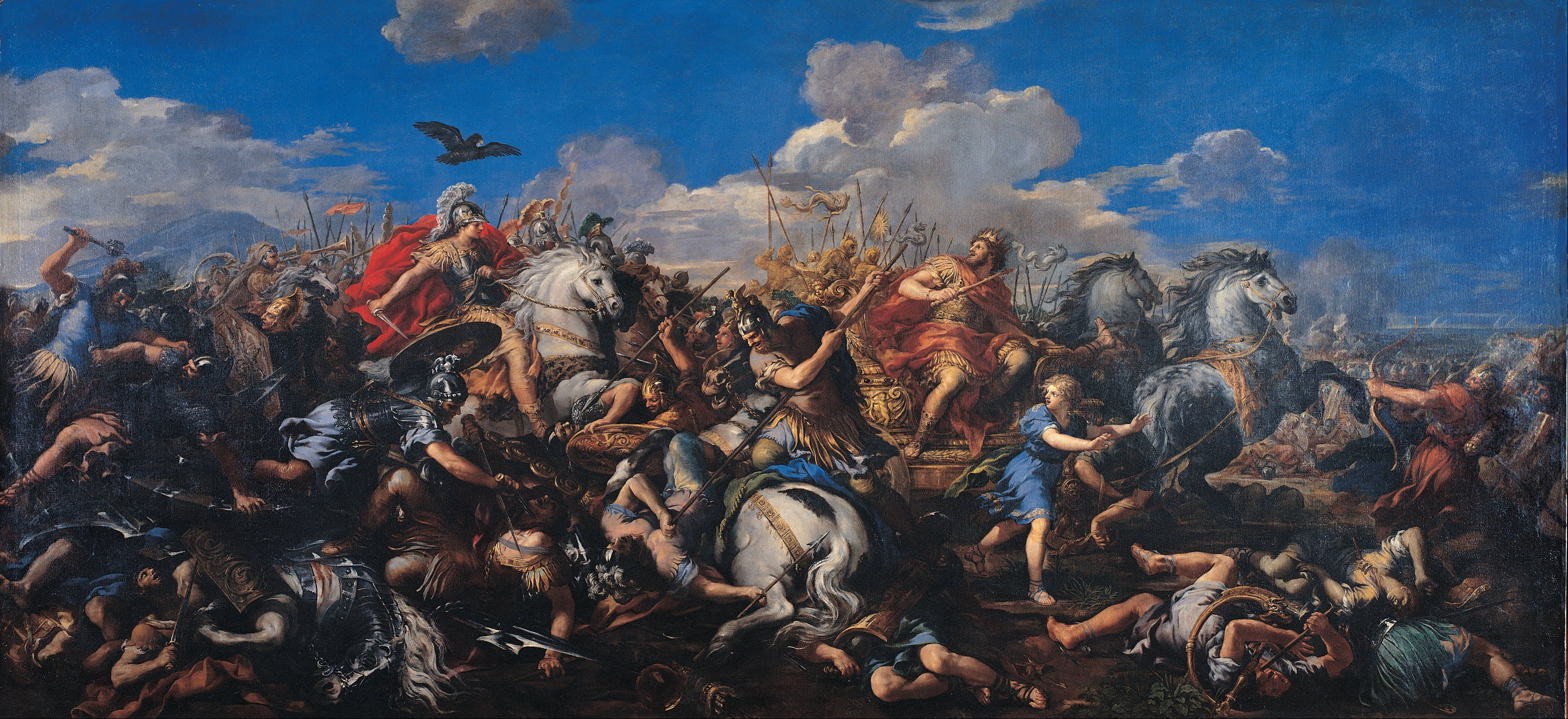
- Battle of Alexander versus Darius by Pietro da Cortona
Date	1 October 331 BC
Location	Probably Tel Gomel (Gaugamela) near Erbil, modern Iraqi Kurdistan, north of Mount Alfaf 36.56°N 43.44°E
Result	Macedonian victory
Territorial changes	Alexander gains Babylon, half of Persia and all other parts of Mesopotamia

Belligerents
Macedonia; Hellenic League	Achaemenid Empire

Commanders and leaders
Alexander the Great; Hephaestion; Parmenion; Ariston; Simmias; Coenus; Menides	Darius III; Bessus; Mazaeus

Strength
47,000; (see Size of Macedonian army)	50,000–250,000 (modern estimates); 250,000–1,000,000 (ancient sources); (see Size of Persian army)

Casualties and losses
1,100–1,500 (Note: 100 infantry and 1,000 cavalry according to Arrian, 300 infantry according to Curtius Rufus, and 500 infantry according to Diodorus Siculus) 1,000 cavalry 100–500 infantry	40,000–90,000 (Note: 40,000 according to Curtius Rufus and 90,000 according to Diodorus Siculus.); 300,000+ captured (according to Arrian)
- Location within Iraq Battle of Gaugamela (West and Central Asia)

Alexander the Great
current battle

The Battle of Gaugamela (/ˌɡɔːɡəˈmiːlə/ GAW-gə-MEE-lə; Ancient Greek: Γαυγάμηλα, romanized: Gaugámēla, lit. 'the Camel's House'), also called the Battle of Arbela (Ἄρβηλα, Árbēla), took place in 331 BC between the forces of the Army of Macedon under Alexander the Great and the Persian Army under King Darius III. It was the second and final battle between the two kings, and is considered to be the final blow to the Achaemenid Empire, resulting in its complete conquest by Alexander.

The fighting took place in Gaugamela, a village on the banks of the river Bumodus, north of Arbela (modern-day Erbil, in Iraqi Kurdistan). Despite being heavily outnumbered, the Army of Macedon emerged victorious due to the employment of superior tactics and the clever usage of light infantry forces. It was a decisive victory for the League of Corinth, and it led to the fall of the Achaemenid Empire and of Darius III.

== Background ==
In November 333 BC, King Darius III had lost the Battle of Issus to Alexander the Great, which resulted in the subsequent capture of his wife, his mother and his two daughters, Stateira II and Drypetis. Alexander's victory at Issus had also given him complete control of southern Asia Minor (modern-day Turkey). After the battle, King Darius retreated to Babylon where he regrouped with his remaining army that was there, on-site from a previous battle.

Alexander fought at the Siege of Tyre (332 BC), which lasted from January to July, and the victory resulted in his control of the Levant. Alexander then again fought at the Siege of Gaza. Persian troop counts in Egypt were diminished due to many soldiers being removed to support the Battle of Issus and dying there. As a result, the Persian satrap of Egypt, Mazaces, peacefully surrendered to Alexander upon his arrival.

=== Negotiations between Darius and Alexander ===
Darius tried to dissuade Alexander from further attacks on his empire by diplomacy. Nawotka writes that "[c]onflicting reports of ancient authors make the reconstruction of peace negotiations hypothetical." Ancient historians provide different accounts of his negotiations with Alexander, which can be separated into three negotiation attempts. Darius reportedly initially requested peace and the safe return of his family, beginning with an offer to pay 10,000 talents as ransom, then offering to cede land in Asia Minor west of the Halys river, and eventually offering to recognize Alexander as a co-equal status as monarch. Alexander rejected all of these offers.

Historians Justin, Arrian and Curtius Rufus, writing in the 1st and 2nd centuries, say that Darius had sent a letter to Alexander after the Battle of Issus. The letter demanded that Alexander withdraw from Asia as well as release all of his prisoners. According to Curtius and Justin, Darius offered a ransom for his prisoners, although Arrian does not mention a ransom. Curtius describes the tone of the letter as offensive, and Alexander refused his demands.

A second negotiation attempt took place after the capture of Tyre. Darius offered Alexander marriage with his daughter Stateira II, as well as all the territory west of the Halys river. Justin is less specific, and does not mention a specific daughter, and only speaks of a portion of Darius' kingdom. Diodorus Siculus (1st century Greek historian) likewise mentions the offer of all territory west of the Halys river, a treaty of friendship and a large ransom for Darius' captives. Diodorus is the only ancient historian who mentions the fact that Alexander concealed this letter and presented his friends with a forged one that was favorable to his own interests. Again, Alexander refused Darius' offers.

Darius began preparations for another battle with Alexander after the failure of the second negotiation attempt. Nevertheless, he made a third and final effort to negotiate with Alexander after Alexander had departed from Egypt. Darius' third offer was much more generous. He praised Alexander for the treatment of his mother Sisygambis, offered him all territory west of the Euphrates, co-rulership of the Achaemenid Empire, the hand of one of his daughters and 30,000 talents of silver. In the account of Diodorus, Alexander explicitly deliberated this offer with his friends. Parmenion was the only one who spoke up, saying, "If I were Alexander, I should accept what was offered and make a treaty." Alexander reportedly replied, "So should I, if I were Parmenion." Alexander, in the end, refused the offer of Darius, and insisted that there could be only one king of Asia. He called on Darius to surrender to him or to meet him in battle in order to decide who would be the sole king of Asia.

The descriptions given by other historians of the third negotiation attempt are similar to the account of Diodorus, but differ in details. Diodorus, Curtius and Arrian write that an embassy was sent instead of a letter, which is also claimed by Justin and Plutarch (1st century). Plutarch and Arrian mention the ransom offered for the prisoners was 10,000 talents, but Diodorus, Curtius and Justin had given the figure of 30,000. Arrian writes that Darius' third attempt took place during the Siege of Tyre, but the other historians place the second negotiation attempt at that time. In spite of everything, with the failure of his negotiation attempts, Darius had now decided to prepare for another battle with Alexander.

== Prelude ==
In the late spring or early summer of 331 BC, Alexander headed from Egypt, northeast through Syria, toward the Tigris river. In July or August, Alexander reached Thapsacus, on the Euphrates river. Arrian relates that Darius had ordered Mazaeus to guard the crossing of the Euphrates near Thapsacus with a force of 3,000 cavalry, and that he fled when Alexander's army approached to cross the river. Alexander arrived at the Tigris in late September.

=== Alexander's march through Mesopotamia ===
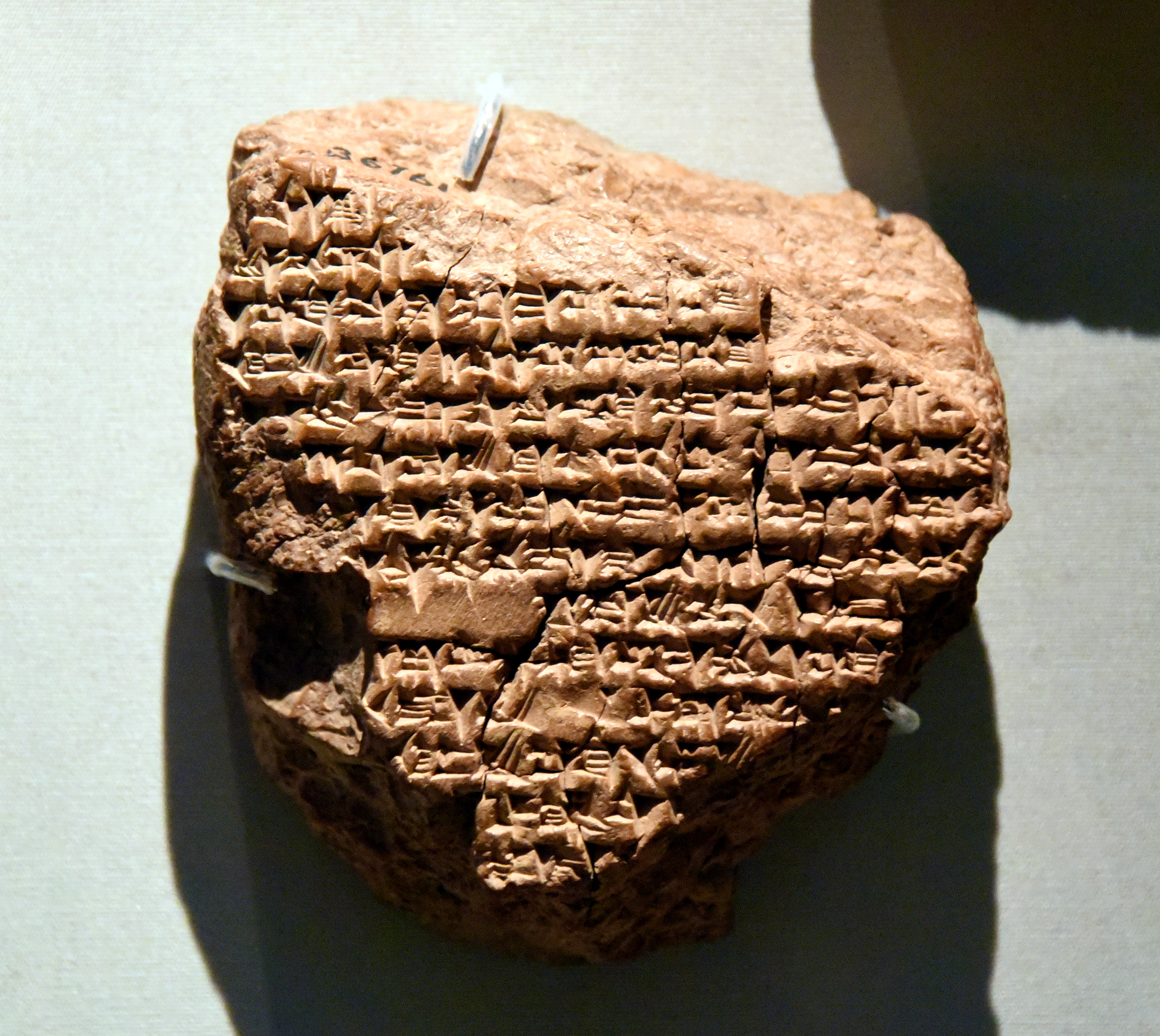
Account of Alexander's victory over the last Achaemenid king Darius III at the battle of Gaugamela on 1 October 331 BC and his triumphant entry into Babylon, in cuneiform. Babylon, Iraq. British Museum

Alexander crossed the Euphrates in the summer of 331 BC. From there, he followed a northern route instead of a direct southeastern route to Babylon. While doing so he had the Euphrates and the mountains of Armenia on his left. The northern route made it easier to forage for supplies and his troops would not suffer the extreme heat of the direct route. Captured Persian scouts reported to the Macedonians that Darius had encamped past the Tigris river. Alexander found the Tigris undefended and succeeded in crossing it with great difficulty.

By contrast, Diodorus mentions that Mazaeus was only supposed to prevent Alexander from crossing the Tigris. He would not have bothered to defend it because he considered it impassable due to the strong current and depth of the river. Furthermore, Diodorus and Curtius Rufus mention that Mazaeus employed scorched-earth tactics in the countryside through which Alexander's army had to pass.

After the Macedonian army had crossed the Tigris, a near-total lunar eclipse occurred on 20–21 September 331 BC. Four days later, Alexander's army spotted members of Mazaeus' cavalry and captured one or two, who gave information about the location of Darius' army at Gaugamela, some eight miles away. In light of the ground-flattening efforts taking place at Gaugamela, Alexander determined that Darius did not intend to change locations, and allowed his troops four days to rest before engaging Darius' army in battle. Following the calculations, the date of the Battle of Gaugamela must have been 1 October in 331 BC.

=== Strategic analysis ===
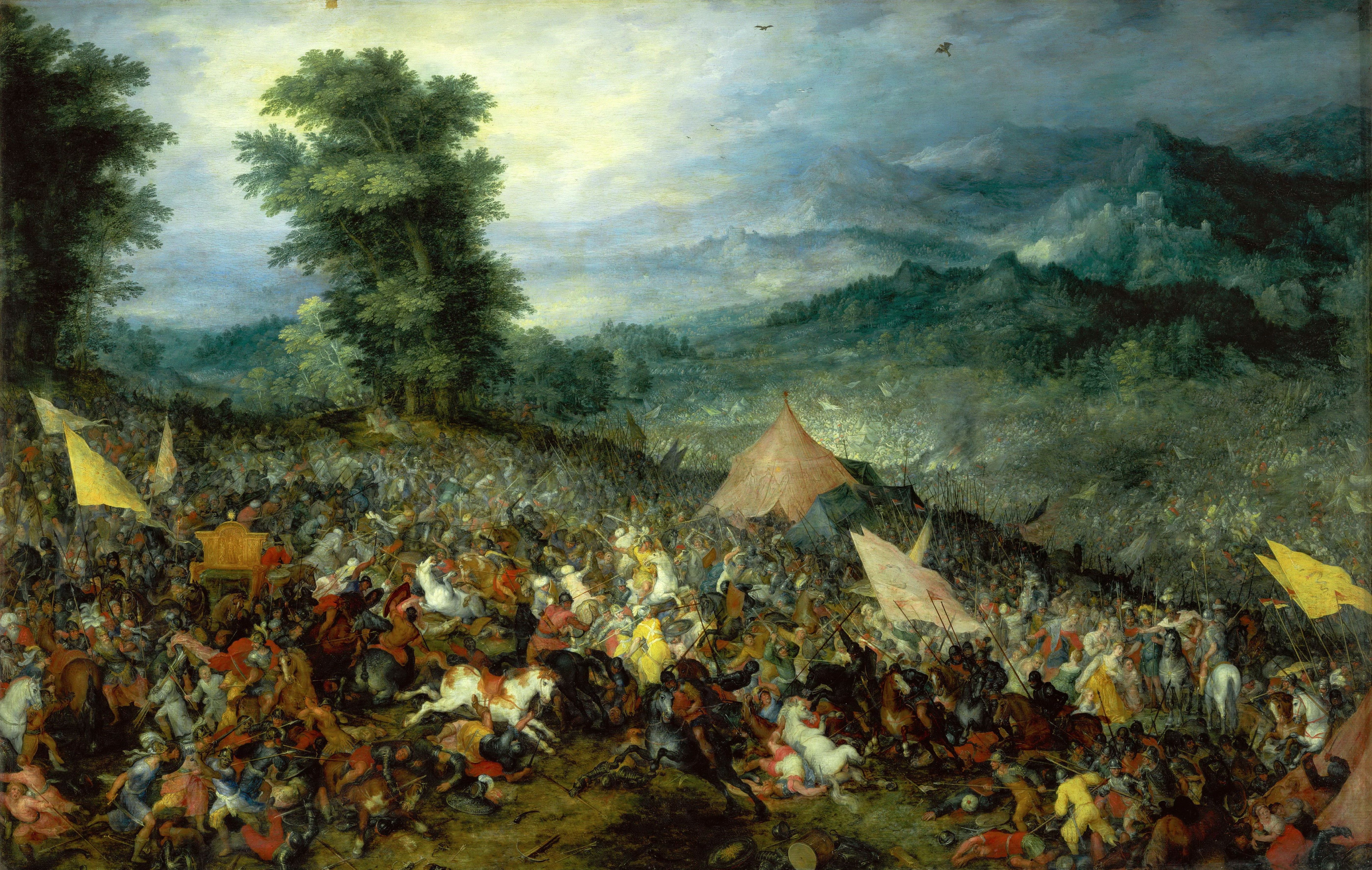
The Battle of Gaugamela, Jan Brueghel the Elder, 1602

Several researchers have criticized the Persians for their failure to harass Alexander's army and disrupt its long supply lines when it advanced through Mesopotamia. Classical scholar Peter Green thinks that Alexander's choice for the northern route caught the Persians off guard. Darius would have expected him to take the faster southern route directly to Babylon, just as Cyrus the Younger had done in 401 BC before his defeat in the Battle of Cunaxa. The use of the scorched-earth tactic and scythed chariots by Darius suggests that he wanted to repeat that battle. Alexander would have been unable to adequately supply his army if he had taken the southern route, even if the scorched-earth tactic had failed. The Macedonian army, underfed and exhausted from the heat, would then be defeated at the plain of Cunaxa by Darius. When Alexander took the northern route, Mazaeus must have returned to Babylon to bring the news. Darius most likely decided to prevent Alexander from crossing the Tigris. This plan failed because Alexander probably took a river crossing that was closer to Thapsacus than Babylon. He would have improvised and chosen Gaugamela as his most favourable site for a battle. Historian Jona Lendering, by contrast, argues that Darius intentionally led the Macedonians to Gaugamela, the Persians' preferred battlefield.

== Location ==
The precise location of the battlefield is not known with certainty, as the ancient sources are sometimes inconsistent and do not provide precise topographical or geographical information. Various sites have been proposed: Tel Gomel, Karamlesh, Qaraqosh, Tell Aswad, and a mound south of Wardak. The most commonly accepted opinion about the location is Karamlesh – suggested by archeologist Sir Aurel Stein in 1938. All of these sites are located in the Nineveh Plains of modern-day Iraq, east of Mosul and west of Erbil, north and south of Jebel Maqlub (also known as Mount Maqlub and Mount Alfaf).

== Size of the Persian army ==
=== Modern estimates ===
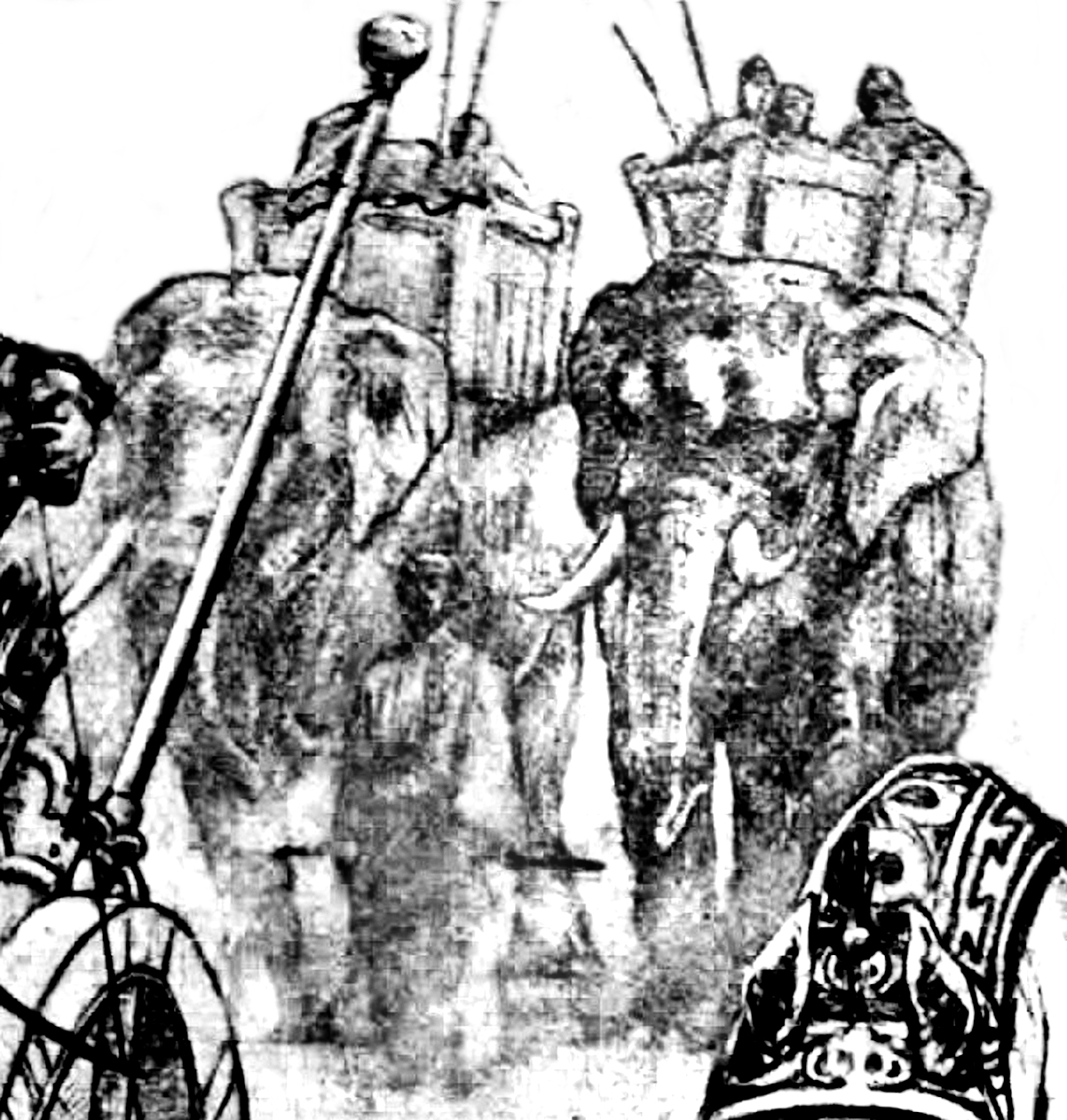
Indian war elephants in the Achaemenid army at the Battle of Gaugamela

Although there is general acceptance among modern scholars of Arrian's numbers for Alexander's forces, the opposite is true with respect to the ancient sources' reports on the size of Darius's army. According to Bichler, among modern authors, "[t]heir common ground is only that the excessively high numbers given in the ancient sources are of no use." Similarly, Worthington writes that the figures given by Diodorus, Plutarch, and Curtius "are absurdly high numbers to show how hopelessly outnumbered Alexander's army was[.]"

Units	Low estimate	High estimate
Infantry	< 40,000	200,000
Cavalry	12,000	45,000
Persian Immortals	10,000	10,000
Greek mercenaries	8,000	10,000
Bactrian cavalry	1,000	2,000
Archers	1,500	1,500
Scythed chariots	200	200
War elephants	15	15
Total	52,000+	268,715

Reinhold Bichler's case study surveyed 20 different sources published between 1920 and 2014, showing that various authors have given widely divergent estimates of Darius's forces, with others remarking that it is not possible to reach any conclusion other than that Alexander's army was outnumbered by the Persians. Hans Delbrück estimates the Persian cavalry at 12,000 because of management issues, the Persian infantry less than that of the Greek heavy infantry, and the Greek mercenaries at 8,000. Warry (1998) estimates a total size of 91,000; Harbottle (2018) 120,000; Engels (1980) and Green (1993) no larger than 100,000.

=== Ancient sources ===
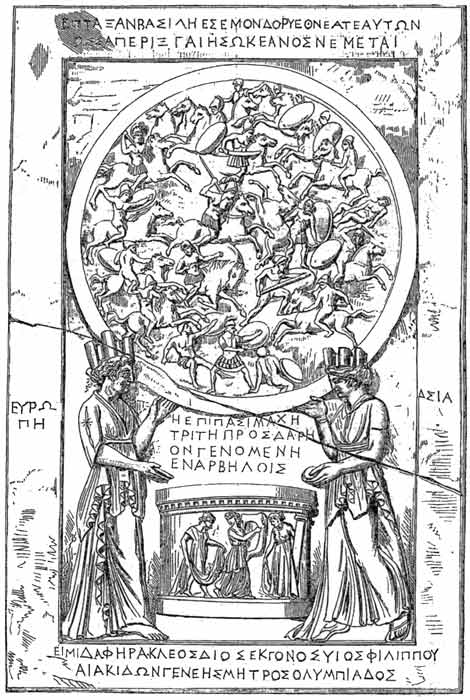
A decorative Neo-Attic relief of the Battle of Gaugamela, with allegories of Europe and Asia standing on the side, 2nd century BC-2nd century AD. Rome, Palazzo Chigi. 19th-century reproduction by engraving.

According to Arrian, Darius' force numbered 40,000 cavalry and 1,000,000 infantry; Diodorus Siculus put it at 200,000 cavalry and 800,000 infantry; Plutarch put it at 1,000,000 troops (without a breakdown in composition), while according to Curtius Rufus it consisted of 45,000 cavalry and 200,000 infantry. Furthermore, according to Arrian, Diodorus and Curtius, Darius had 200 chariots while Arrian mentions 15 war elephants. Included in Darius's infantry were about 2,000 Greek mercenary hoplites.

According to Arrian, Indian troops were also deployed. He explains that Darius III "obtained the help of those Indians who bordered on the Bactrians, together with the Bactrians and Sogdianians themselves, all under the command of Bessus, the Satrap of Bactria". The Indians in question were probably from the area of Gandāra. Indian "hill-men" are also said by Arrian to have joined the Arachotians under Satrap Barsaentes, and are thought to have been either the Sattagydians or the Hindush.

While Darius had a significant advantage in numbers, most of his troops were of a lower quality than Alexander's. Alexander's pezhetairoi were armed with a six-metre pike, the sarissa. The main Persian infantry was poorly trained and equipped in comparison to Alexander's pezhetairoi and hoplites. The only respectable infantry Darius had were his 2,000 Greek hoplites and his personal bodyguard, the 10,000 Immortals. The Greek mercenaries fought in a phalanx, armed not with a heavy shield but with spears no longer than three metres, while the spears of the Immortals were two metres long. Among the other Persian troops, the most heavily armed were the Armenians, who were armed the Greek way and probably fought as a phalanx.

== Size of the Macedonian army ==
Units	Numbers
Heavy infantry	31,000
Light infantry	9,000
Cavalry	7,000

Alexander commanded Greek forces from his kingdom of Macedon and the Hellenic League, along with Greek mercenaries and levies from the Paeonian and Thracian tributary peoples. According to Arrian, his forces numbered 7,000 cavalry and 40,000 infantry. Most historians agree that the Macedonian army consisted of 31,000 heavy infantry, including mercenaries and hoplites from other allied Greek states in reserve, with an additional 9,000 light infantry consisting mainly of peltasts with some archers. The size of the Greek-mounted army was about 7,000.

== Battle ==
=== Initial dispositions ===
The battle began with the Persians already present on the battlefield. Darius had recruited the finest cavalry from his Eastern satrapies and from allied Scythian tribes and deployed scythed chariots, for which he had ordered bushes and vegetation removed from the battlefield to maximize their effectiveness. He also had 15 Indian elephants supported by Indian chariots. However, the absence of any mention of those elephants during the battle and their later capture in the Persian camp indicate they were withdrawn. The reason might have been fatigue.

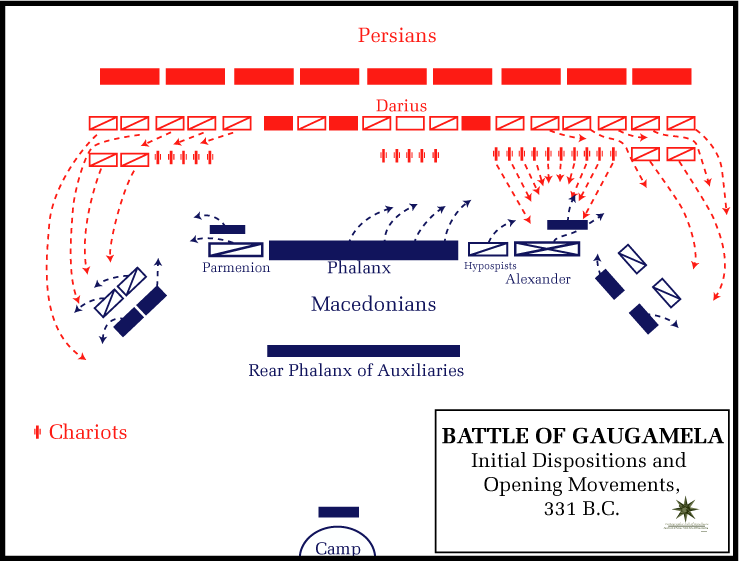
Initial dispositions and opening movements

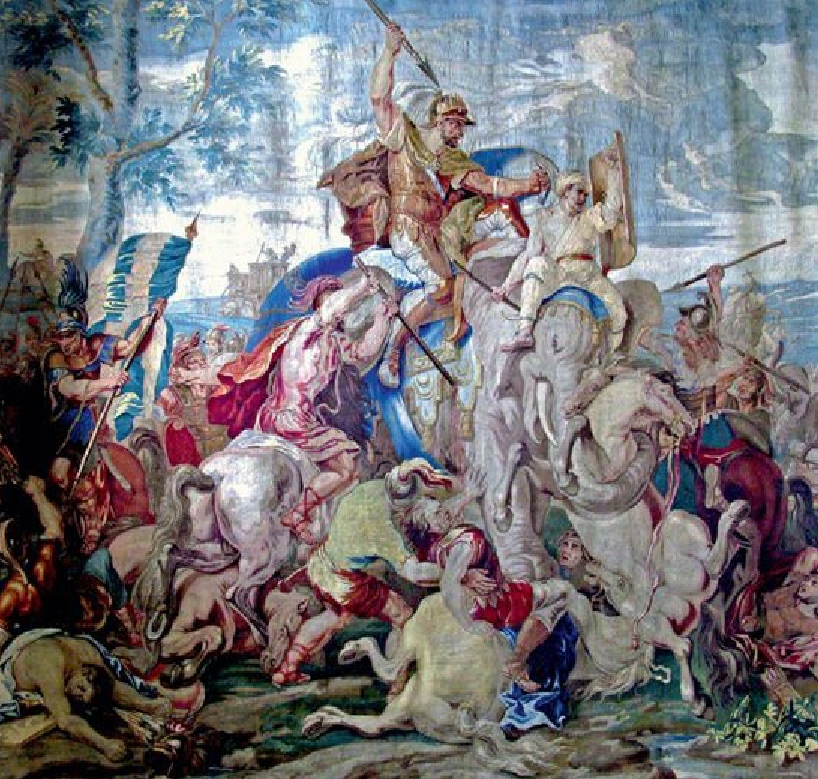
The Battle of Gaugamela is illustrated in this tapestry, based on a painting by the 17th-century French artist, Charles Le Brun (1619–90). Le Brun undertook a series of paintings in the 1660s and 1670s depicting the triumphs of Alexander the Great, as homage to his wealthy patron, King Louis XIV.

Darius placed himself in the center with his best infantry, as was the tradition among Persian kings. He was surrounded by, on his right, the Carian cavalry, Greek mercenaries and Persian horse guards. In the right-center, he placed Persian foot guards (Apple Bearers/Immortals to the Greeks), the Indian cavalry and his Mardian archers.

On both flanks were the cavalry. Bessus commanded the left flank with the Bactrians, Dahae cavalry, Arachosian cavalry, Persian cavalry, Susian cavalry, Cadusian cavalry and Scythians. Chariots were placed in front with a small group of Bactrians. Mazaeus commanded the right flank with the Syrian, Median, Mesopotamian, Parthian, Sacian, Tapurian, Hyrcanian, Caucasian Albanian, Sacesinian, Cappadocian and Armenian cavalry. The Cappadocians and Armenians were stationed in front of the other cavalry units and led the attack. The Albanian cavalry were sent around to flank the Greek left. According to Curtius, the archers were all Amardi.

The Macedonians were divided into two, with the right side under the direct command of Alexander and the left of Parmenion. Alexander fought with his Companion cavalry. With it was the Paionian and Greek light cavalry. The mercenary cavalry was divided into two groups, veterans on the flank of the right and the rest in front of the Agrianes and Greek archers, who were stationed next to the phalanx. Parmenion was stationed on the left with the Thessalians, Greek mercenaries and Thracian cavalry. There they were to conduct a holding action while Alexander launched the decisive blow from the right.

On the right-center were Cretan mercenaries. Behind them were Thessalian cavalry under Phillip, and Achaean mercenaries. To their right was another part of the allied Greek cavalry. From there came the phalanx, in a double line. Outnumbered over 5:1 in the cavalry, with their line surpassed by over a mile, it seemed inevitable that the Greeks would be flanked by the Persians. The second line was given orders to deal with any flanking units should the situation arise. This second line consisted mostly of mercenaries.

=== Beginning of the battle ===
Alexander began by ordering his infantry to march in phalanx formation towards the center of the enemy line. The Macedonians advanced with the wings echeloned back at 45 degrees to lure the Persian cavalry to attack. While the phalanxes battled the Persian infantry, Darius sent a large part of his cavalry and some of his regular infantry to attack Parmenion's forces on the left.

During the battle, Alexander employed an unusual strategy which has been duplicated only a few times. While the infantry battled the Persian troops in the centre, Alexander began to ride all the way to the edge of the right flank, accompanied by his Companion Cavalry. His plan was to draw as much of the Persian cavalry as possible to the flanks, to create a gap within the enemy line where a decisive blow could then be struck at Darius in the centre. This required almost perfect timing and maneuvering and Alexander himself to act first. He would force Darius to attack (as they would soon move off the prepared ground), though Darius did not want to be the first to attack after seeing what happened at Issus against a similar formation. In the end, Darius' hand was forced, and he attacked.

=== Cavalry battle in the Hellenic right wing ===
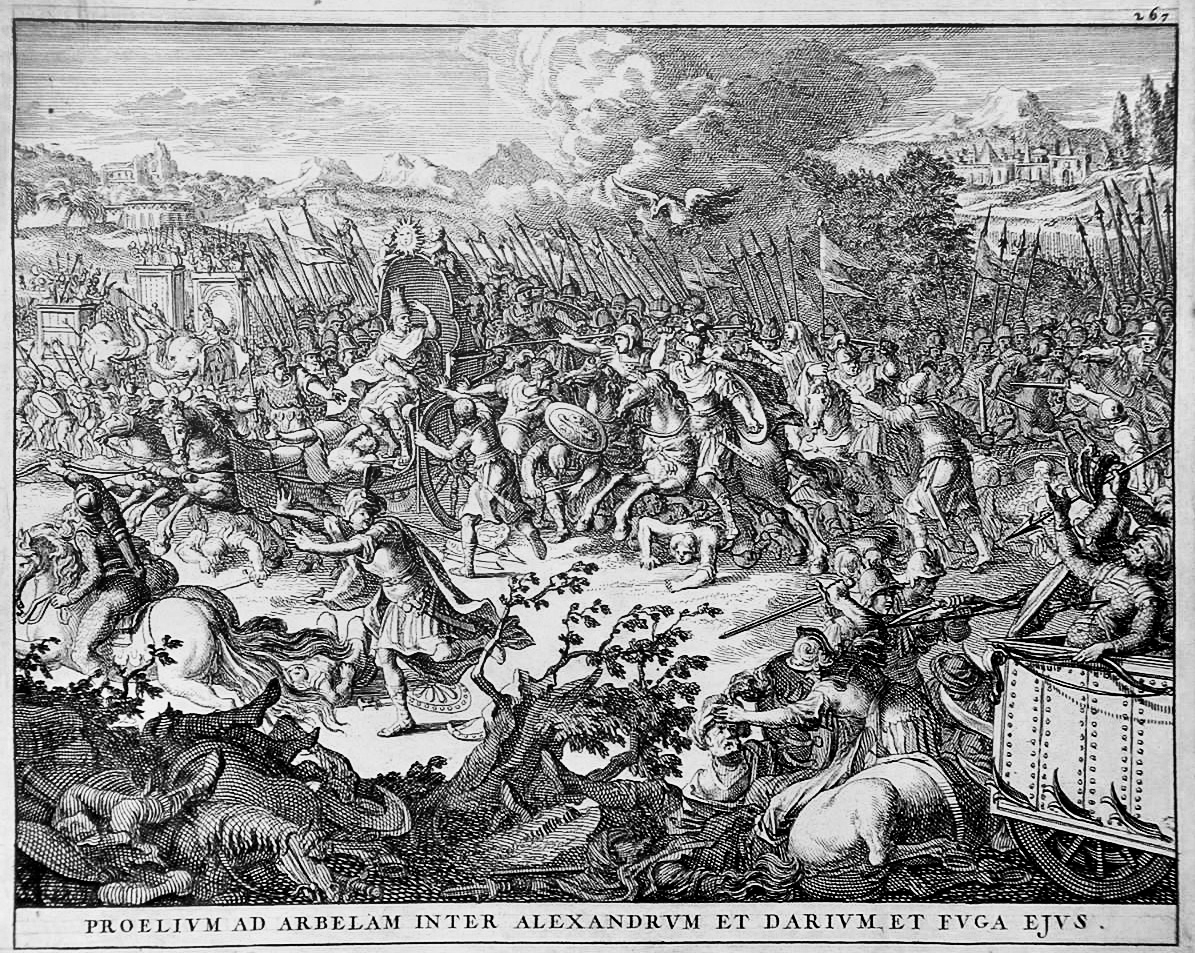
Battle of Gaugamela, engraving, first half of 18th century.

The Scythian cavalry from the Persian left wing opened the battle by attempting to flank Alexander's extreme right. What followed was a long and fierce cavalry battle between the Persian left and the Macedonian right, in which the latter, being greatly outnumbered, was often hard-pressed. However, by careful use of reserves and disciplined charges, the Greek troops were able to contain their Persian counterparts, which would be vital for the success of Alexander's decisive attack.

As told by Arrian:

Then the Scythian cavalry rode along the line and came into conflict with the front men of Alexander's array, but he nevertheless still continued to march towards the right, and almost entirely got beyond the ground which had been cleared and levelled by the Persians. Then Darius, fearing that his chariots would become useless, if the Macedonians advanced into the uneven ground, ordered the front ranks of his left wing to ride round the right wing of the Macedonians, where Alexander was commanding, to prevent him from marching his wing any further. This being done, Alexander ordered the cavalry of the Grecian mercenaries under the command of Menidas to attack them. But the Scythian cavalry and the Bactrians, who had been drawn up with them, sallied forth against them and being much more numerous they put the small body of Greeks to rout. Alexander then ordered Aristo at the head of the Paeonians and Grecian auxiliaries to attack the Scythians, and the barbarians gave way. But the rest of the Bactrians, drawing near to the Paeonians and Grecian auxiliaries, caused their own comrades who were already in flight to turn and renew the battle; and thus they brought about a general cavalry engagement, in which more of Alexander's men fell, not only being overwhelmed by the multitude of the barbarians, but also because the Scythians themselves and their horses were much more completely protected with armour for guarding their bodies. Notwithstanding this, the Macedonians sustained their assaults, and assailing them violently squadron by squadron, they succeeded in pushing them out of rank.

The tide finally turned in the Greek favor after the attack of Aretes' Prodromoi, likely their last reserve in this sector of the battlefield. By then, however, the battle had been decided in the center by Alexander himself.

The Persians also who were riding round the wing were seized with alarm when Aretes made a vigorous attack upon them. In this quarter indeed the Persians took to speedy flight; and the Macedonians followed up the fugitives and slaughtered them.

=== Attack of the Persian scythed chariots ===
Darius now launched his chariots at those troops under Alexander's personal command; many of the chariots were intercepted by the Agrianians and other javelin-throwers posted in front of the Companion cavalry. Those chariots who made it through the barrage of javelins charged the Macedonian lines, which responded by opening up their ranks, creating alleys through which the chariots passed harmlessly. The hypaspists and the armed grooms of the cavalry then attacked and eliminated these survivors.

=== Alexander's decisive attack ===
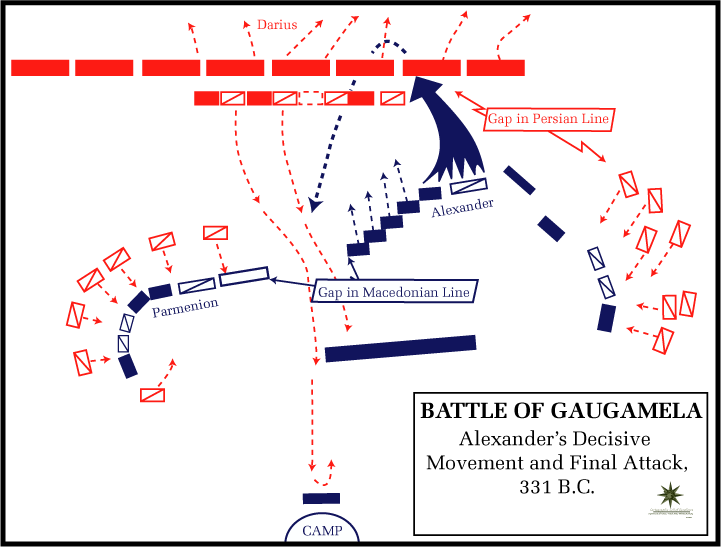
Alexander's decisive attack

As the Persians advanced farther and farther to the Greek flanks in their attack, Alexander slowly filtered in his rear guard. He disengaged his Companions and prepared for the decisive attack. Behind them were the guard's brigade along with any phalanx battalions he could withdraw from the battle. He formed his units into a giant wedge, with him leading the charge. The Persian infantry at the center was still fighting the phalanxes, hindering any attempts to counter Alexander's charge. This large wedge then smashed into the weakened Persian center, taking out Darius' royal guard and the Greek mercenaries. Darius was in danger of being cut off, and the widely held modern view is that he now broke and ran, with the rest of his army following him. This is based on Arrian's account:

For a short time there ensued a hand-to-hand fight; but when the Macedonian cavalry, commanded by Alexander himself, pressed on vigorously, thrusting themselves against the Persians and striking their faces with their spears, and when the Macedonian phalanx in dense array and bristling with long pikes had also made an attack upon them, all things together appeared full of terror to Darius, who had already long been in a state of fear, so that he was the first to turn and flee.

=== Left flank ===
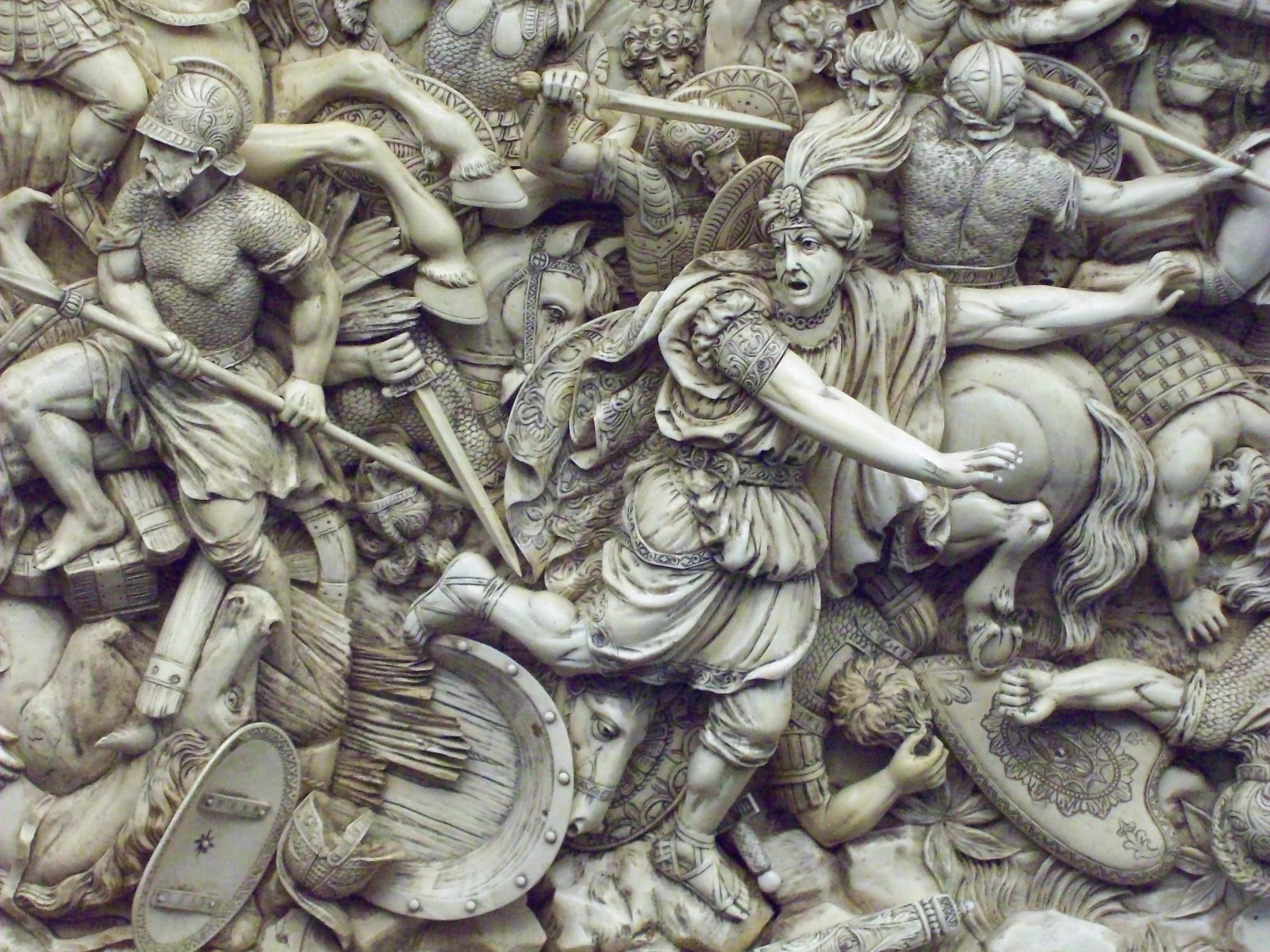
Darius flees (18th-century ivory relief) (National Archaeological Museum, Madrid)

Alexander could have pursued Darius at this point. However, he received desperate messages from Parmenion (an event that would later be used by Callisthenes and others to discredit Parmenion) on the left. Parmenion's wing was apparently encircled by the cavalry of the Persian right wing; being attacked from all sides, it was in a state of confusion. Alexander was faced with the choice of pursuing Darius and having the chance of killing him, ending the war in one stroke but at the risk of losing his army, or going back to the left flank to aid Parmenion and preserve his forces, thus letting Darius escape to the surrounding mountains. He decided to help Parmenion, and followed Darius later.

While holding on the left, a gap had opened up between the left and center of the Macedonian phalanx, due to Simmias' brigade of pezhetairoi being unable to follow Alexander in his decisive attack, as they were being hard-pressed. The Persian and Indian cavalry in the center with Darius broke through. Instead of taking the phalanx or Parmenion in the rear, however, they continued towards the camp to loot. They also tried to rescue the Queen Mother, Sisygambis, but she refused to go with them. These raiders were in turn attacked and dispersed by the rear reserve phalanx as they were looting.

What happened next was described by Arrian as the fiercest engagement of the battle, as Alexander and his companions encountered the cavalry of the Persian right, composed of Indians, Parthians and "the bravest and most numerous division of the Persians", desperately trying to get through to escape. Sixty Companions were killed in the engagement, and Hephaestion, Coenus and Menidas were all injured. Alexander prevailed, however, and Mazaeus also began to pull his forces back as Bessus had. However, unlike on the left with Bessus, the Persians soon fell into disorder as the Thessalians and other cavalry units charged forward at their fleeing enemy.

== Aftermath ==
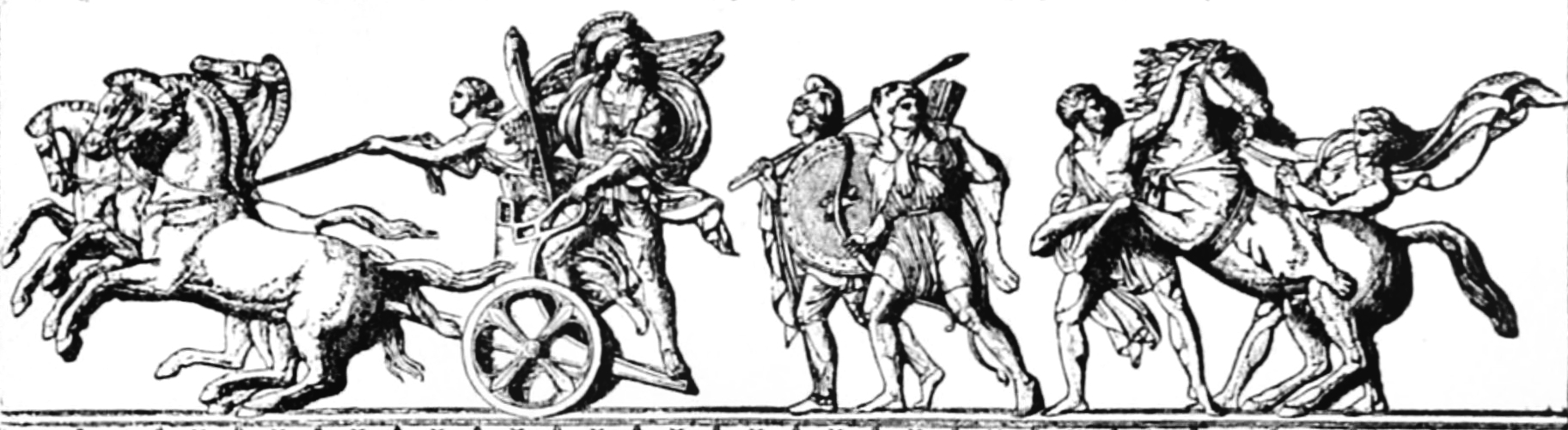
Alexander entering Babylon

After the battle, Bagophanes formally surrendered the city of Babylon to Alexander. Parmenion rounded up the Persian baggage train while Alexander and his bodyguard pursued Darius. As at Issus, substantial loot was gained, with 4,000 talents captured, the King's personal chariot and bow and the war elephants. It was a disastrous defeat for the Persians and one of Alexander's finest victories.

Darius managed to escape by horseback with a small corps of his forces remaining intact. The Bactrian cavalry and Bessus caught up with him, as did some of the survivors of the Royal Guard and 2,000 Greek mercenaries. At this point, the Persian Empire was divided into two halves—East and West. On his escape, Darius gave a speech to what remained of his army. He planned to head further east and raise another army to face Alexander, assuming that the Greeks would head towards Babylon. At the same time he dispatched letters to his eastern satraps asking them to remain loyal.

The satraps, however, had other intentions. Bessus murdered Darius before fleeing eastwards. When Alexander discovered Darius had been murdered, he was saddened to see an enemy he respected killed in such a fashion, and gave Darius a full burial ceremony at Persepolis, the former ceremonial capital of the Persian Empire, before angrily pursuing Bessus, capturing and executing him the following year. The majority of the remaining satraps gave their loyalty to Alexander and were allowed to keep their positions. The Achaemenid Persian Empire is traditionally considered to have ended with the death of Darius.

== See also ==
- Military tactics of Alexander the Great

== Sources ==
=== Ancient sources ===
- Arrian (1893). Chinnock, E. J. (ed.). Anabasis Alexandri.
- Diodorus Siculus (1963). Welles, C. Bradford (ed.). Library of History. Vol. 17. Cambridge, Massachusetts: Harvard University Press. ISBN 978-0-674-99464-5.
- Plutarch (1936). "On the Fortune or the Virtue of Alexander". In Babbitt, Frank Cole (ed.). Moralia. Vol. 4. Cambridge, Massachusetts: Harvard University Press. pp. 379‑487. ISBN 978-0-674-99336-5.
- Plutarch (1919). "Life of Alexander". In Perrin, Bernadotte (ed.). Lives. Vol. 7. Cambridge, Massachusetts: Harvard University Press. pp. 707–741. ISBN 978-0-674-99110-1.
- Justin (1853). Watson, John Selby (ed.). Epitome of the Philippic History of Pompeius Trogus. London: Henry G. Bohn.
- Quintus Curtius Rufus (1880). Vogel, Theodor (ed.). Histories of Alexander the Great.

=== Modern sources ===
- Bichler, Reinhold (2020). "The Battle of Gaugamela: A Case Study and Some General Methodological Considerations". In Luggin, Johanna; Fink, Sebastian (eds.). Battle descriptions as literary texts: a comparative approach. Universal- und kulturhistorische Studien. Studies in Universal and Cultural History. Translated by Pramhaas, Franz. Wiesbaden [Heidelberg]: Springer VS. pp. 157–189. doi:10.1007/978-3-658-27859-5. ISBN 978-3-658-27858-8. S2CID 218943609.
- Binder, Carsten (2021). "From Darius II to Darius III". In Jacobs, Bruno; Rollinger, Robert (eds.). A Companion to the Achaemenid Persian Empire. John Wiley & Sons. pp. 458–471. ISBN 978-1119174288.
- Briant, Pierre (2015). Darius in the shadow of Alexander. Translated by Jane Marie Todd. Cambridge: Harvard University Press. ISBN 9780674493094.
- Creasy, Edward Shepherd (1851). The Fifteen Decisive Battles of The World : From Marathon to Waterloo. Vol. 1. London: Richard Bentley and Son.
- Cummings, Lewis Vance (2004). Alexander the Great. New York: Grove Press. ISBN 978-0-8021-4149-1.
- De Santis, Marc G. (2001). "At The Crossroads of Conquest". Military Heritage. 3 (3): 46–55, 97.
- Delbrück, Hans (1990). History of the Art of War. Translated by Walter J. Renfroe Jr. Lincoln: University of Nebraska Press. ISBN 978-0-8032-6584-4.
- Doge, Theodore Ayrault (1918). Alexander: A History of the Origin and Growth of the Art of War from the Earliest Times to the Battle of Ipsus, B.C. 301. Tales End Press. ISBN 978-1-105-60250-4.
- Engels, Donald W. (1980). Alexander the Great and the Logistics of the Greek Army. Berkeley and Los Angeles: University of California Press. ISBN 978-0-520-04272-8.
- English, Stephen (2010). The Field Campaigns of Alexander the Great. Pen & Sword. ISBN 978-1-84884-066-9.
- Farrokh, Kaveh (2007). Shadows in the desert: ancient Persia at war. Oxford: Osprey Publishing. ISBN 978-1-84603-108-3.
- Fox, Robin Lane (2006). Alexander the Great. Penguin UK. ISBN 978-0-14-192598-1.
- Freeman, Philip (2011). Alexander the Great. Simon & Schuster. ISBN 978-1-4391-9328-0.
- Fuller, J. F. C. (1987). A Military History of the Western World: From the earliest times to the Battle of Lepanto. Vol. 1. Da Capo Press. ISBN 978-0-306-80304-8.
- Gehrke, Hans-Joachim (2004). "Gaugamela, 1. Oktober 31 v. Chr.". In Förster, S.; Pöhlmann, M.; Walter, D. (eds.). Schlachten der Weltgeschichte: von Salamis bis Sinai (in German). Munich: Deutscher Taschenbuch-Verlag. pp. 32–47. ISBN 9783406480973.
- Green, Peter (2013). Alexander of Macedon, 356–323 B.C.: A Historical Biography. Berkeley and Los Angeles: University of California Press. ISBN 978-0-520-95469-4.
- ——— (1993). Alexander to Actium: The Historical Evolution of the Hellenistic Age. Hellenistic Culture and Society. Vol. 1. Berkeley and Los Angeles: University of California Press. ISBN 978-0-520-08349-3.
- Hanson, Victor Davies (2007). Carnage and Culture: Landmark Battles in the Rise to Western Power. Anchor Books. ISBN 978-0-307-42518-8.
- Harbottle, Thomas B. (2018). Dictionary of Battles From the Earliest Date to the Present Time. Franklin Classics. ISBN 978-0341839699.
- Magee, Peter; Petrie, Cameron; Knox, Richard; Khan, Farid; Thomas, Ken (2005), "The Achaemenid Empire in South Asia and Recent Excavations in Akra in Northwest Pakistan", American Journal of Archaeology, vol. 109, pp. 711–741
- Nawotka, Krzysztof (2021). "The Conquest by Alexander". In Jacobs, Bruno; Rollinger, Robert (eds.). A Companion to the Achaemenid Persian Empire. John Wiley & Sons. pp. 473–485. ISBN 978-1119174288.
- Pietrykowski, Joseph (2012). Great Battles of the Hellenistic World. Pen & Sword. ISBN 9781848846883.
- Schachermeyr, Fritz (1973). Alexander der Große: Das Problem seiner Persönlichkeit und seines Wirkens (in German). Vienna: Austrian Academy of Sciences. ISBN 9783700100003.
- Strauss, Barry S. (2012). Masters of Command: Alexander, Hannibal, Caesar, and the Genius of Leadership. Simon & Schuster. ISBN 978-1-4391-6448-8.
- Van der Spek, R. J. (2003). "Darius III, Alexander the Great and Babylonian Scholarship". In Henkelman, W.; Kuhrt, A. (eds.). A Persian Perspective: Essays in Memory of Heleen Sancisi-Weerdenburg. Achaemenid History. Vol. 13. Leiden: Nederlands Instituut voor het Nabije Oosten. pp. 289–342. ISBN 978-90-6258-413-0.
- Ward, Steven R. (2014). Immortal: A Military History of Iran and Its Armed Forces. Washington, D.C.: Georgetown University Press. ISBN 978-1-62616-032-3.
- Warry, John (1998). Warfare in the Classical World. Barnes & Noble. ISBN 978-0-7607-1696-0.
- Worthington, Ian (2014). By the spear: Philip II, Alexander the Great, and the rise and fall of the Macedonian empire. Oxford: Oxford University Press. ISBN 978-0-19-992986-3.
- Yenne, Bill (2010). Alexander the Great: Lessons From History's Undefeated General. New York: Palgrave MacMillan. ISBN 978-0-230-61915-9.
