= Companion cavalry =

Ancient Macedonian cavalry

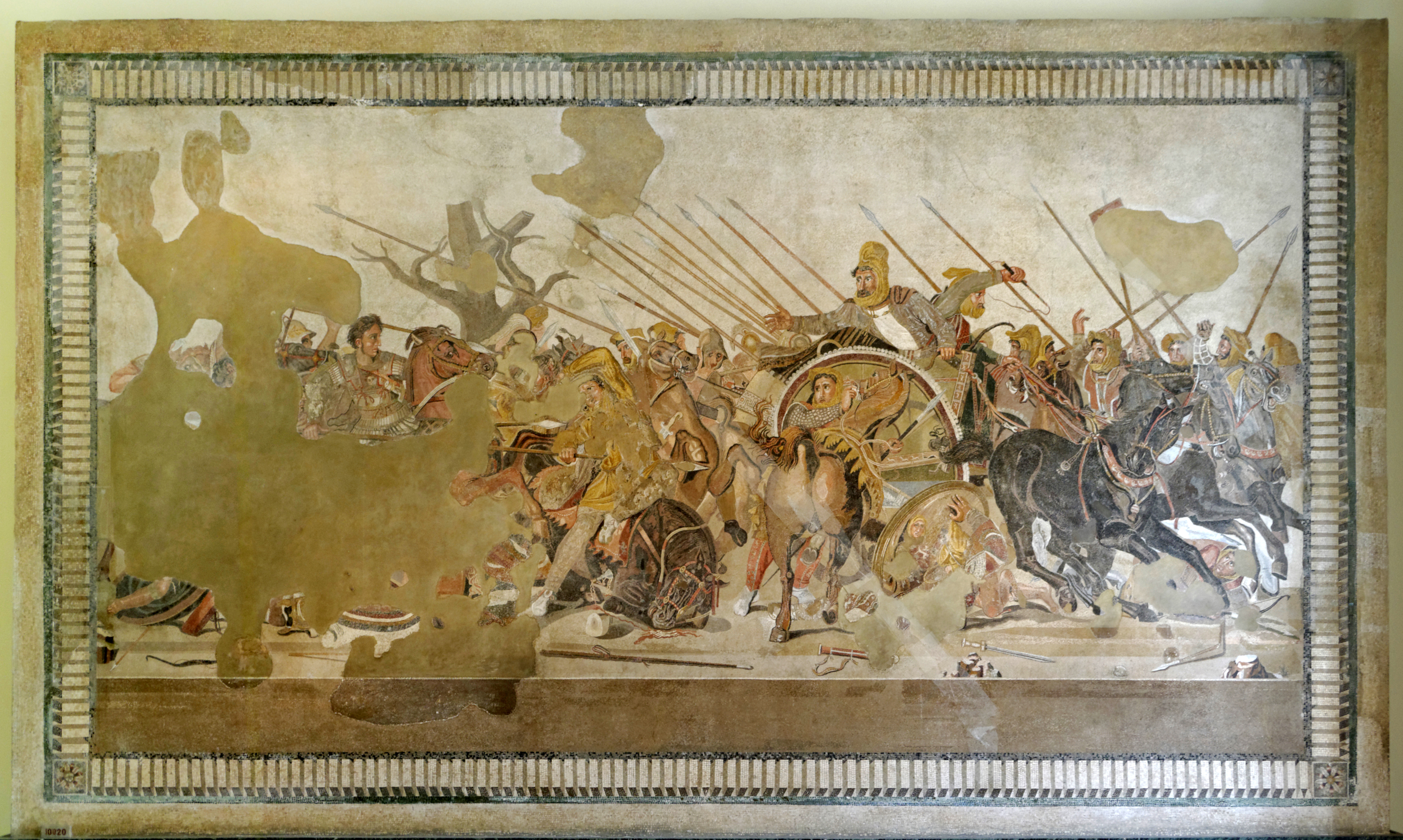
Alexander Mosaic, showing the Battle of Issus, from the House of the Faun, Pompeii

The Companions (Greek: ἑταῖροι, Greek: [heˈtairoi̯], hetairoi) were the elite heavy cavalry of the Macedonian army from the time of King Philip II of Macedon, achieving their greatest prestige under Alexander the Great, and regarded as the first or among the first shock cavalry used in Europe. Chosen Companions, or Hetairoi, formed the elite guard of the king (Somatophylakes).

== Etymology ==
The name of the military unit derives from Greek Hetairoi, those near the king. The Hetairoi (Companions) could be members of the Macedonian aristocracy or commoners of any origin who enjoyed the trust and friendship of the Macedonian regent. The Hetairideia, a festival pertaining to the sacred relationship which bound the king and his companions together was celebrated and even Euripides, the famed Athenian playwright, was honoured as an hetairos of the king Archelaus. The Royal friends (Philoi) or the king's Companions (basilikoi hetairoi) were named for life by the king among the Macedonian aristocracy.

== Unit ==
=== Equipment ===
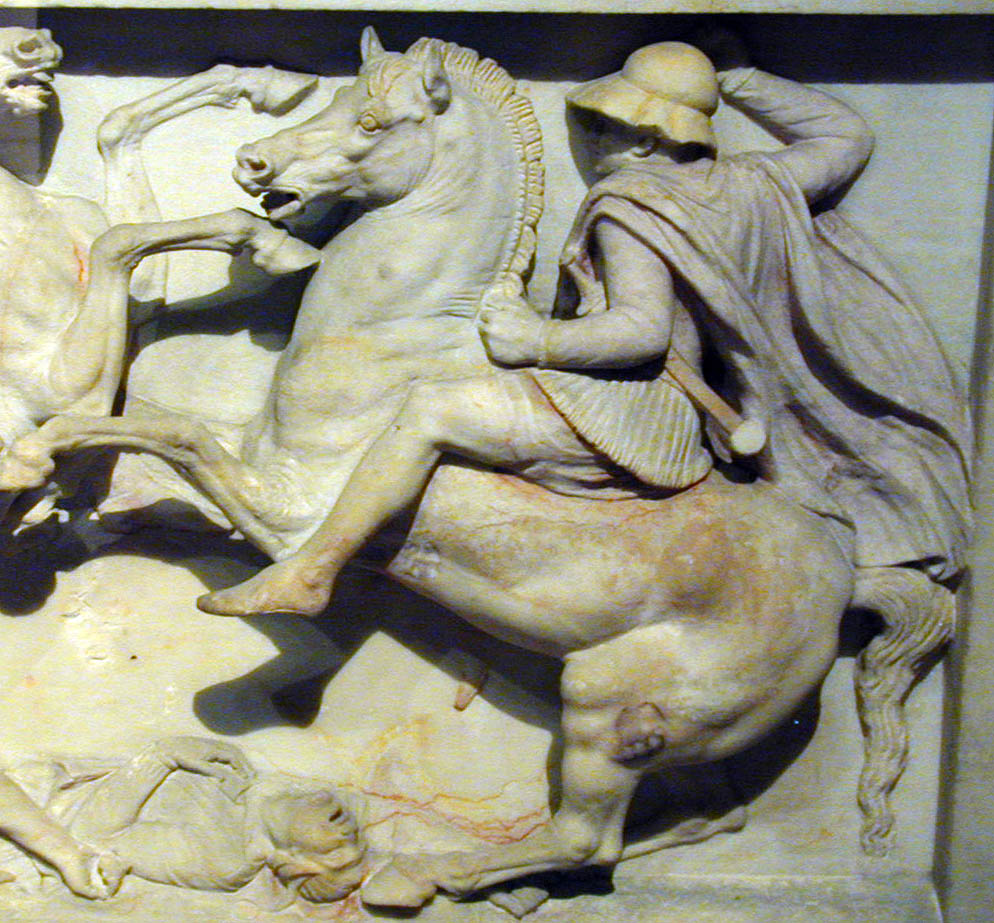
A heavy cavalryman of Alexander the Great's army, possibly a Thessalian, though the Companion cavalry would have been almost identical (the shape of the cloak of the latter was more rounded). He wears a cuirass (probably a linothorax) and a Boeotian helmet, and is equipped with a scabbarded xiphos straight-bladed sword. Alexander Sarcophagus.

Companion cavalry was composed of the most powerful nobles, and as such, had access to the best horses and equipment available. In Alexander's day, they mostly carried a xyston (long thrusting spear), and wore a bronze muscle cuirass or linothorax, shoulder guards and Boeotian helmets, but bore no shield. A kopis (curved slashing sword) or xiphos (cut and thrust sword) was also carried for close combat, should the xyston be lost or broken.

=== Organization ===
The Companion cavalry was composed of the Hetairoi of the king, mainly upper class citizens who were able to acquire and maintain armour and horses. In the age of Philip II and Alexander they were organized into 8 territorial squadrons, termed ilai. Each ile numbered between 200 and 300 horsemen. They were originally commanded by a single leader, Philotas under Alexander the Great, but following his execution would see the leadership split between two men, Cleitus the Black and Hephaestion. Arrian claims this would be because, Alexander "did not want anyone, not even his intimate friend, to be the centre of attention". After receiving reinforcements in Susa, Alexander established two companies in each squadron. They were referred to by the name of the territory they were mustered in or by the name of its captain. The Royal Ile was commanded by Alexander himself and contained twice the number of soldiers the other units contained, c. 400. These cavalry squadrons would sometimes be combined in groups of two, three or four to form a hipparchy, which was commanded by a hipparch, though the whole Companion force was generally commanded by Alexander.

In Alexander's Balkan campaigns, we find mention of Companions from upper Macedonia, the central Macedonian plain and Amphipolis. During the advance on Granicus, a squadron commanded by Socrates of Macedon (not to be confused with the philosopher) hailed from Apollonia on Lake Bolbe. During the Battle of Issus, Arrian names the ile of Anthemus (modern Galatista); another, from the unidentified land of Leuge (likely Pieria), is also mentioned.

Theopompus describes the Companions, probably of around the mid 4th century BC, as being made of "no more than 800 at this time" and mustered "some from Macedonia, some from Thessaly and still others from the rest of Greece". By 338 BC, Alexander is reported to have had around 2600 in his Companion Cavalry. As Alexander's force campaigned towards India, barbarians played an increasing role in the Companion Cavalry and the Macedonian mutiny at Opis may have been partially caused by this. At one point, there were four hipparchies made up of entirely oriental forces and one that was a mix of Macedonians and orientals.

=== Tactics and use ===
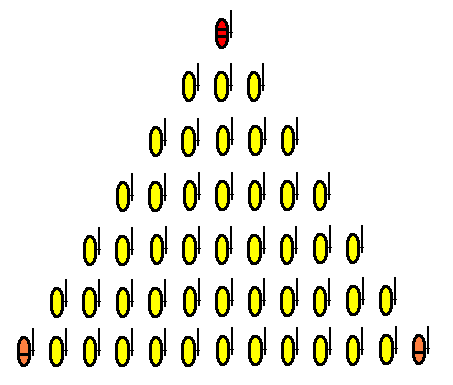
Macedonian Companion cavalry ile in wedge formation

The Companions constituted one of the first shock cavalry in history, able to conduct charges against massed infantry. Many contemporary cavalry, even when heavily armored, would most usually be equipped with javelins and would avoid melee. In this respect, Companions were similar to the older Iranian heavy cavalry who were armed with lances and also engaged in melee combat.

In battle, it would form part of a hammer and anvil tactic: the Companion cavalry would be used as a hammer, in conjunction with the Macedonian phalanx-based infantry, which acted as their anvil. The phalanx would pin the enemy in place, while the Companion cavalry would attack the enemy on the flank or from behind.

In battle, Alexander the Great personally led the charge at the head of the royal squadron of the Companion cavalry, usually in a wedge formation. In a pitched battle, the Companions usually fought on the right wing of the Macedonian army, next to the shield-bearing guards, the hypaspists, who would guard the right flank of the phalanx. Other cavalry troops would protect the flanks of the Macedonian line during battle. Under Alexander's command, the Companions' role was decisive in most of his battles in Asia.

== Legacy ==
=== Hellenistic kingdoms ===
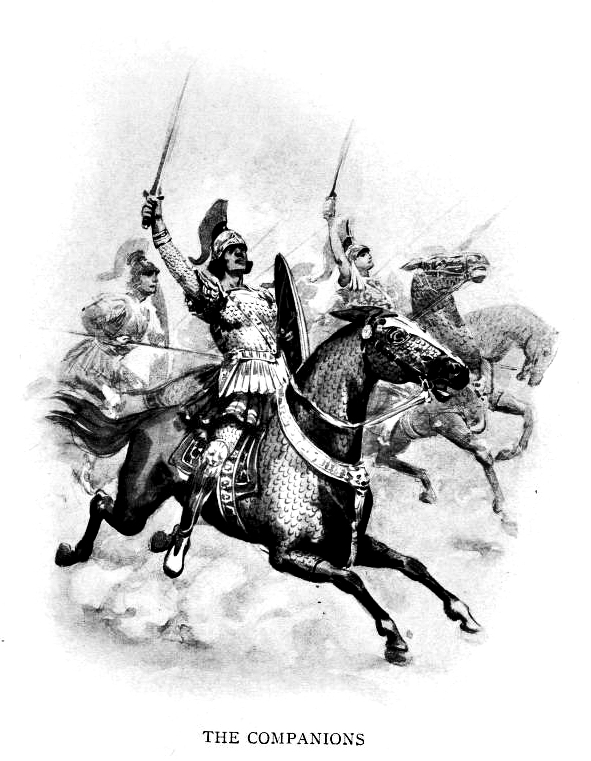
The Companions of Alexander the Great

The Companion cavalry of the Diadochoi (Alexandrian successor-states), were even more heavily equipped. Seleucid Companions were noted to have worn lighter, but not otherwise dissimilar, equipment to the cataphracts at the Battle of Magnesia in 190 BC, which may have included partial horse armour and leg and arm protection. Ptolemaic Companions and Antigonid Companions were also equipped with a large round aspis cavalry shield unlike the Companions of Phillip and Alexander.

'Companions' was a title not used by the Seleucids in its original sense. It was replaced with different and various grades of 'King's Friends'. However, the title 'Companions' was kept as a regimental one. There was only one regiment or unit that held the title of Companions in the entire Hellenistic world though; the Antigonids and Ptolemies had different names for their elite cavalry regiments.

=== Eastern Roman Empire ===
The Hetaireia or Hetaeria was a corps of bodyguards during the Byzantine Empire. Its name means "the Company", echoing the ancient Macedonian Companion cavalry. The imperial Hetaireia was composed chiefly of foreigners. They acted as part of the Byzantine imperial guard alongside the tagmata in the 9th–12th centuries.

== See also ==
- Hetair-, a Greek linguistic root
- Hetaireia
- Panegorus
- Pezhetairos
- Sarissophoroi
- Somatophylakes
