= List of ancient Macedonians =

This is a list of ancient Macedonians, an ancient Greek tribe inhabiting the northeastern part of the Greek peninsula.

== Mythology ==
- Makednos

== Military personnel ==
=== High generals ===
- Parmenion – Strategos of Philip and Alexander and commander of pharsalian squadron
- Attalus strategos of Philip and early taxiarch of Alexander
- Hephaestion – Chiliarch (after 327 BC)
- Perdiccas – Chiliarch (after 324 BC)
- Seleucus I Nicator – Chiliarch (after 323 BC)

==== Somatophylakes ====
- Aristonous of Pella
- Arybbas (somatophylax)
- Balacrus
- Demetrius (somatophylax)
- Hephaestion
- Leonnatus
- Lysimachus
- Menes of Pella
- Pausanias of Orestis Philip's
- Peithon
- Peucestas
- Ptolemy (somatophylax)
- Ptolemy (son of Seleucus)
- Ptolemy I Soter

=== Cavalry ===
==== Hipparchoi ====
- Philotas (after 330 BC, Cleitus the Black, Coenus, Hephaestion, Craterus, Perdiccas, Cleitus the White) leaders of Hetairoi (1800 horses)
- Cleitus the Black, Royal cavalry
- Sopolis, cavalry of Amphipolis
- Heraclides (son of Antiochus), cavalry of Bottiaea
- Peroidas cavalry of Anthemus
- Socrates cavalry of Apollonia
- Pantordanus cavalry of Leugaea
- Hegelochus, (later Amyntas (son of Arrhabaeus), Protomachus, Aretes), Prodromoi, light cavalry (600 horses)
- Calas, Alexander of Lyncestis, Philip, Polydamas, Parmenion–Thessalian cavalry (1800 horses)
- Philip (son of Menelaus) (after 331 BC, Erigyius), other allied Greeks (600 horses)
- Agathon (son of Tyrimmas), (later Ariston of Paionia) Thracian cavalry (900 horses) *Total: 5700 horses in 333 BC
- Demetrius (son of Althaemenes), Glaucias, Meleager, mentioned in the Battle of Gaugamela

=== Infantry ===
==== Taxiarchs of Pezhetairoi ====
- Nicanor (son of Parmenion) 334 BC leader of Royal Agema and Hypaspists (succeeded by Neoptolemus (general))
- Alcetas
- Amyntas 334 BC
- Antigenes
- Antigonus I Monophthalmus 334 BC
- Attalus (general) 334 BC
- Attalus (son of Andromenes from Stympha)
- Clitus the White
- Coenus 334 BC
- Craterus 334 BC
- Gorgias
- Meleager (general) 334 BC
- Menander (general) 334 BC
- Peithon, son of Agenor
- Perdiccas 334 BC
- Philip (son of Amyntas) 334 BC
- Philotas (satrap)
- Polyperchon
- Ptolemy (son of Seleucus)
- Ptolemy I Soter 334 BC
- Simmias

=== Navy ===
==== Navarchoi ====
- Proteas
- Hegelochus
- Amphoterus
- Nearchus

===== Trierarchs of Nearchus =====
- Archon of Pella
- Archias of Pella
- Aristonous of Pella
- Asclepiodorus
- Craterus
- Demonicus of Pella
- Hephaestion
- Leonnatus
- Lysimachus
- Metron
- Mylleas
- Nicarchides
- Ophellas
- Pantauchus
- Peithon
- Perdiccas
- Peucestas
- Ptolemy I Soter
- Timanthes of Pella

=== Various ===
- Agathon brother of Parmenion
- Arrhidaeus
- Asander
- Attinas, phrourarch in Bactria
- Caranus hetairos
- Coragus
- Derdas
- Eudemus (general)
- Harpalus
- Iollas
- Lagus
- Menedemus (general)
- Menelaus (son of Lagus)
- Nicanor (Antipatrid general)
- Nicanor (father of Balacrus)
- Nicanor (Ptolemaic general)
- Nicanor the Elephant
- Onesilus (son of Python)
- Onomastus of Macedon
- Philip of Acarnania
- Philip (son of Antigonus)
- Philip (son of Antipater)
- Philip (son of Machatas)
- Philoxenus (general)
- Polemon (general) son of Andromenes
- Ptolemy (general) nephew of Antigonus
- Sirras, of possible Lyncestian or Upper Macedonian origin, father of Eurydice of Macedon
- Teutamus
- Tlepolemus (son of Pythophanes)

== Civilization ==
=== Athletes ===
- Alexander I of Macedon 504 or 500 BC Stadion 2nd Olympics
- c. 430–420 BC Argive Heraean games
- Archelaos Perdikas 408 BC Tethrippon in Olympic and Pythian Games
- Philip II of Macedon (Thrice Olympic Winner), 356 BC Horse Race, 352 BC Tethrippon, 348 BC two-colt chariot, Synoris
- 344 BC Tethrippon Panathenaics
- Archon of Pella 334–332 BC Horse race Isthmian and Pythian Games
- Antigonus (son of Callas) 332–331 BC Hoplitodromos Heraclean games in Tyrus, after the Conquest of the city
- Malacus Μάλακος 329/328 BC Dolichos Amphiarian games
- Criton or Cliton 328 BC Stadion Olympics
- Damasias of Amphipolis 320 BC Stadion Olympics
- Lagus (son of Ptolemeus) Λᾶγος 308 BC Synoris Arcadian Lykaia
- Epaenetus (son of Silanus) Ἐπαίνετος 308 BC Tethrippon Lykaia
- Heraclitus Ἡράκλειτος 304 BC stadion Lykaia
- Bubalus of Cassandreia Βούβαλος 304 BC keles (horse) flat race Lykaia
- Lampos of Philippi 304 BC Tethrippon Olympics
- Antigonus 292 and 288 BC Stadion Olympics
- Seleucus 268 BC Stadion Olympics
- Belistiche 264 BC Tethrippon and Synoris Olympics
- Apollodorus (runner) (1st century BC) Olympics

Horse race Olympic Victors as recorded in recent discovered epigrams of Posidippus of Pella (c. 3rd century BC)

- Ptolemy I Soter
- Ptolemy II Philadelphus
- Arsinoe I
- Arsinoe II
- Berenice Phernophorus
- Berenice II
- Cleopatra II
- Etearchus Ἐτέαρχος
- Molycus Μόλυκος
- Plangon Πλαγγών woman
- Trygaios Τρυγαῖος

=== Writers ===
- Adaios (c. 450 BC) epigrammatic poet
- Antipater (c. 397 BC–319 BC) Illyrian Wars
- Ptolemy I Soter (367 BC–283 BC) patron of letters, historian of Alexander's campaign
- Alexander the Great (356–323 BC) epistolist, rhetor quotes
- Alexarchus, scholar, conlanger
- Leon of Pella (4th-century BC) historian On the Gods in Egypt
- Marsyas of Pella (356–294) historian
- Marsyas of Philippi (3rd century BC) historian
- Hippolochus (early 3rd century BC) description of a Macedonian wedding feast
- Poseidippus of Cassandreia (c. 288 BC) comic poet
- Poseidippus of Pella (c. 280 BC–240 BC) epigrammatic poet
- Amerias (3rd century BC) lexicographer
- Craterus (historian) (3rd century BC) anthologist, compiler of historical documents relative to the history of Attica
- Oikiades (son of Nikandros) from Cassandreia Tragoedus winner in Soteria (festival) 272 BC
- Ptolemy IV Philopator, wrote a tragedy entitled Adonis, and presumably played the lead.
- Hermagoras of Amphipolis (c. 225 BC), stoic philosopher
- Samus (son of Chrysogonus), (late 3rd century BC)
- Craterus of Amphipolis (c. 100–30 BC) Rhapsode winner in Amphiarian games
- Phaedrus of Pieria (c. 15 BC–c. 50 AD) fabulist
- Antipater of Thessalonica (late 1st century BC) epigrammatic poet and governor of the city
- Philippus of Thessalonica (late 1st century AD) epigrammatic poet and compiler of the Greek Anthology
- Epigonus of Thessalonica
- Perses epigrammatist
- Archias, epigrammatist
- Antiphanes (late 1st century AD), epigrammatist
- Parmenion (late 1st century AD), epigrammatist
- Polyaenus, (2nd century AD) military writer
- Criton of Pieria (2nd century AD) historian
- Stobaeus (5th century AD) anthologist of Greek authors
- Macedonius of Thessalonica (the Consul), (6th century AD), epigrammatist of Greek Anthology

=== Scientists ===
- Poseidonius, mechanician
- Pyrrhus mechanician
- Demetrius I Poliorcetes, mechanician
- Archias of Pella, geographer under Nearchus
- Parmenion (architect)
- Patrocles (geographer)

=== Artists ===
- Pamphilus (painter), teacher of Apelles (4th century BC)
- Parmeniskos group potters (3rd century BC)
- Aetion of Amphipolis, sculptor
- Erginus (son of Simylus) from Cassandreia citharede winner in Soteria (festival) c. 260 BC
- _ (son of Callistratus) from Philippi Dancer winner in Soteria (festival) c. 250 BC
- Heraclides (painter) (2nd century BC) marine painter
- Herophon (son of Anaxagoras) (2nd–1st centuries BC) sculptor
- Evander of Beroea (1st century AD) sculptor
- Adymus of Beroea (1st century AD) sculptor

=== Priests ===
- Menelaus (son of Lagus)
- Agathanor

=== Theorodokoi ===
- Perdiccas, possibly Perdiccas III of Macedon c. 365–311 BC Epidaurian
- Pausanias of Kalindoia, possibly the same as Pausanias the pretender to the Macedonian throne in the 360s BC
- Hadymos and Seleukos son of Argaios

=== Naopoioi ===
Naopoios (Temple-builder), an elected Archon by Hieromnemones, responsible for restoring the temple of Apollo in Delphi

- Philippus Φίλιππος Μακεδών
- Timanoridas (son of Cordypion) Τιμανορίδας Κορδυπίωνος Μακεδών c. 361–343 BC
- Leon (son of Hegesander) Λέων Ἡγησάνδρου Μακεδών 331 BC

=== Women ===
- Arsinoe of Macedonia mother of Ptolemy I Soter
- Belistiche olympionice
- Cleopatra of Macedon sister of Alexander, wife of Alexander I of Epirus
- Cleopatra Eurydice, niece of Attalus (general), and 5th wife of Philip
- Cynane half-sister of Alexander
- Eurydice of Egypt daughter of Antipater and wife of Ptolemy I Soter
- Eurydice I of Macedon mother of Philip II
- Eurydice II of Macedon wife of Phillip III
- Eurydice III of Macedon Adea, wife of Philip Arrhidaeus
- Lanike sister of Clitus the Black and the nurse of Alexander
- Nicaea of Macedonia daughter of Antipater, wife of Lysimachus
- Nicesipolis wife of Philip, mother of Thessalonica
- Olympias mother of Alexander
- Phila, daughter of Antipater, wife of Demetrius Poliorcetes and mother of Antigonus II Gonatas
- Philinna of Larissa, wife of Philip, mother of Philip III of Macedon
- Stratonice of Macedonia wife of Demetrius Poliorcetes
- Thessalonica half-sister of Alexander, wife of Cassander
- Olympias II of Epirus, wife of Alexander II of Epirus

== See also ==
- List of ancient Macedonians in epigraphy
