= List of ancient Macedonians in epigraphy =

Ancient Macedonians are attested in epigraphy from the 5th century BC throughout classical antiquity. For those recorded in classical literary sources, see list of ancient Macedonians.

== Atheno-Macedonian decrees ==
=== Attica (c. 436 bc) ===
The names occur also in the second decree below

- Aeropos Ἀέροπος son of Philippos
- Agelaos Ἀγέλαος son of Alketes
- Alketas Ἀλκέτας son of Alexandros I (and one Alexandros son of Alketes)
- Archelas Ἀρχέλας son of Perdikkas II (Archelaus I of Macedon)
- Menelaos Μενέλαος son of Alexandros
- Perdikkas Περδίκκας son of Alexandros I (Perdiccas II the king)

=== Attica (c. 415 BC) ===
- Adimos Ἄδιμος hapax as Adimos, always Adymos
- Alexandros Ἀλέχσανδρος son of Pantaponos Παντάπονος
- Agathon Ἀγάθων
- Agerros Ἄγερρος son of Philippos
- Antigenes Ἀντιγένης
- Antiochos Ἀντίοχος termed as basileus king, presumably of Orestians
- Arrabaios Ἀρραβαῖος Arrhabaeus the king of Lyncestis
- Attakinos Ἀττακῖνος
- Autannios Αὐτάννιος
- Bordinos Βορδῖνος
- Botres Βότρης
- Boukris Βοῦκρις
- Byrginos Βυργῖνος son of Kraston Κράστων
- Dadinos Δαδῖνος
- Derdas Δέρδας
- Dirbeas Διρβέας
- Etharos Ἔθαρος
- Eulandros Εὔλανδρος
- Eurylochos Εὐρύλοχος
- Gaiteas Γαιτέας
- Idatas Ἰδάτας
- Kallias Καλλίας
- Kallimachos Καλλίμαχος
- Kleandros Κλέανδρος
- Kratennas Κρατέννας
- Korrabos Κόρραβος
- Korratas Κορράτας
- Lykaios Λύκαιος
- Limnaios Λιμναῖος
- Meleagros Μελέαγρος
- Misgon Μίσγων
- Neoptolemos Νεοπτόλεμος
- Nikandros Νίκανδρος
- Nomenios Νομένιος
- Pausanias Παυσανίας son of Machetas Μαχέτας (Machatas)
- Stadmeas Σταδμέας

== Amphipolis (352-350 BC) ==
sale deed of a house

- Antipatros Ἀντίπατρος son of Kleinias Κλεινίας seller
- Aratos Ἄρατος buyer
- Arogomachos Ἀρωγόμαχος witness
- Damon Δάμων neighbour
- Dionyzios Διονύζιος witness
- Dynnichos Δύννιχος neighbour
- Garreskios Γαρρήσκιος witness
- Hermagoras Ἑρμαγόρας priest
- Hipottas Ἱππότας guarantor
- Laandrichos Λαάνδριχος seller
- Polyainos Πολύαινος witness
- Philotas Φιλώτας witness
- Spargis Σπάργις epistates chairman

== Kalindoia decree (c. 335 - 305 BC) ==
- Agathanor Ἀγαθάνωρ son of Agathon Ἀγάθων priest
- Amerias Ἁμερίας son of Kydias Κυδίας
- Antigonos Ἀντίγονος son of Menandros Μένανδρος
- Antimenon Ἀντιμένων son of Menandros Μένανδρος
- Antiphanes Ἀντιφάνης son of Soson Σώσων
- Glaukias Γλαυκίας son of Dabreias Δαβρείας
- Gydias Γυδίας son of Krithon Κρίθων
- Gylis Γύλις son of Eurytias Εὐρυτίας
- Harpalos Ἅρπαλος son of Pha[— — —]
- Hegesippos Ἡγήσιππος son of Nikoxenos Νικόξενος
- Ikkotas Ἱκκότας son of Gyrtos Γύρτος
- Kallias Καλλίας son of Apollonios Ἀπολλώνιος
- Kanoun Κανουν son of Assa[.]mikos Ἀσσα[.]μικος
- Kertimmas Κερτίμμας son of Krithon Κρίθων
- Kratippos Κράτιππος son of Eurytias Εὐρυτίας
- Lykourgos Λυκοῦργος son of Nikanor Νικάνωρ
- Menelaos Μενέλαος son of Menandros Μένανδρος
- Myas Μύας son of Philiskos Φιλίσκος or Philistos
- Nikanor Νικάνωρ son of Nikon Νίκων and Nikanor son of Sosos Σῶσος
- Parmenion Παρμενίων son of Al[— — —]
- Pason Πάσων son of Skythas Σκύθας
- Perdikkas Περδίκκας son of Ammadiskos Ἀμμαδίσκος
- Philagros Φίλαγρος son of Menandros Μένανδρος
- Philotas Φιλώτας son of Leonidas Λεωνίδας
- Philoxenos Φιλόξενος son of E[— — —]
- Ptolemmas Πτολέμμας son of M..
- Sibras Σίβρας son of Herodoros Ἡρόδωρος
- Troilos Τρωΐλος son of Antigonos Ἀντίγονος
- Waddys Ϝαδδῦς or Gaddys Γάδδυς son of Astion Ἀστίων

== Lete (c. 350 - 300 BC) ==
- Lysandros Λύσανδρος son of Amyntas and
- Lyson Λύσων son of Pleistiades or Nausiades along with their hetairoi
- Adaios Ἀδαῖος
- Agestratos Ἁγέστρατος
- Alketas Ἀλκέτας
- Antigonos Ἀντίγονος
- Antiphilos Ἀντιφίλος
- Arrabaios Ἀρραβαῖος
- Attalos Ἄτταλος
- Attinas Ἀττίνας
- Demetrios Δημήτριος
- Epigonos Ἐπίγονος
- Epikrates Ἐπικράτης
- Epimenes Ἐπιμένης
- Euthymides Εὐθυμίδης
- Iollas Ἰόλλας
- Lysanias Λυσανίας
- Menandros Μένανδρος
- Polemon Πολέμων
- Ptolemaios Πτολεμαῖος
- Sirras Σίρρας
- Sopatros Σώπατρος

== Curse tablets (4th century BC) ==
=== Mygdonia ===
- Diogenes Διογένης
- Epanaros Ἐπάναρος
- Hosperos Ὥσπερος the father of them
- Iobiles Ἰοβίλης
- Kriton Κρίτων
- Menon Μένων

=== Pella ===
- Dionysophon Διονυσοφῶν
- Makron Μάκρων
- Thetima Θετίμας

=== Pydna ===
- Agesias Ἁγησίας
- Aiolos Αἴολος
- Alkimos Ἄλκιμος
- Amdokos Ἀμδῶκος
- Amerynkas Ἀμηρύγκας
- Amyntas Ἀμύντας
- Amyntichos Ἀμύντιχος
- Amyntor Ἀμύντωρ
- Antiphila Ἀντιφίλα
- Arisstion Ἀρισστίων
- Arybbas Ἀρύββας
- Asandros Ἄσανδρος
- Boulona Βουλόνα
- Chorotimas Χωροτίμας
- Euboula Εὐβούλα
- Euippas Εὐίππας
- Euphanios Εὐφάνιος
- Euthydikos Εὐθύδικος
- Diognetos Διόγνητος
- Dionysios Διονύσιος
- Doros Δωρώς
- Galestas Γαλέστας
- Harpalos Ἅρπαλος
- Hippias Ἱππίας
- Hellan Ἑλλάν
- Kallias Καλλίας
- Kleandros Κλέανδρος
- Krateuas Κρατεύας
- Ktolemmas Κτολέμμας
- Kyllis[-] Κυλλισ[—]
- Limnaios Λιμναῖος
- Lokros Λόκρος
- Lynkoritas Λυγκωρίτας
- Lysidamos Λυσίδαμος
- Menyllos Μένυλλος
- Mikalinos Μικαλῖνος
- Nautas Ναύτας
- Nikandros Νίκανδρος
- Nikonidas Νικωνίδας
- Nikolaos Νικόλαος
- Nikylla Νίκυλλα
- Oroidyos Ορωιδυος
- Pauratas Παυράτας
- Pausanias Παυσανίας
- Philan Φιλάν
- Philippos Φίλιππος
- Philonychos Φιλώνιχος
- Polemokrates Πολεμοκράτης
- Polykasta Πολυκάστα
- Protocharis Πρωτόχαρις
- Simmias Σιμμίας
- Sitalkas Σιτάλκας
- Stratonika Στρατονίκα
- Tarrias Ταρρίας
- Theopropos Θεόπροπος
- Theutimos Θεύτιμος
- Thrason Θράσων
- Timokrates Τιμοκράτης
- Trochas Τρόχας

== Parmeniskos group (3rd century BC) ==
A list of potters

== Theorodokoi ==
- Perdiccas, possibly Perdiccas III of Macedon ~365-311 BC Epidaurian
- Pausanias of Kalindoia
- Hadymos and Seleukos son of Argaios

== Naopoioi ==
Naopoios (Temple-builder), an elected Archon by Hieromnemones, responsible for restoring the temple of Apollo in Delphi

- Philippus Φίλιππος Μακεδών
- Timanoridas (son of Cordypion) Τιμανορίδας Κορδυπίωνος Μακεδών ~361-343 BC
- Leon (son of Hegesander) Λέων Ἡγησάνδρου Μακεδών 331 BC

== Individuals ==
=== 500 - 400 BC ===
- Aristotima Ἀριστοτίμα of Sôsos Σῶσος Dion c. 400 BC
- Attya Ἀττύα Aiane c. 450-400 BC
- Apakos Ἄπαϟος owner's signature in inscribed bronze strigil. Aiane c. 500 - 475 BC.
- Arkaps Ἄρκαπος ἔρια (Arkapos eria, wools of Arkaps) Aiane c. 450BC
- Eugeneia Εὐγένεια daughter of Xenon Ξένων Pella c. 400 BC
- Kleiona Κλειόνα Aiane c. 500 - 450 BC
- Machatas Μαχάτας owner's inscription, incised after firing. Attic kylix sherd. Eordaea early 5th century BC
- Peperias Πεπερίας Aigai early 5th century BC
- Pythagore Πυθαγόρη of Aristokrates, Aristobole Ἀριστοβόλη Pella stoichedon c. 500 - 450
- Theotimos Θεότιμος son of Parmenon Παρμένων Dion - late 5th century BC
- Xanthos Ξάνθος son of Amadika Ἀμαδίκα and Demetrios Δημήτριος Pella c. 400 BC
- Xenariste Ξεναρίστη of Boulagoras. Pella western necropolis c. 400 BC
- Zôbia Ζωβία Pella epitaph c. 400 BC

=== 400 - 300 BC ===
- Andreas Ἀνδρέας son of Andrôn Ἄνδρων from Osbe. Beroia epitaph c. 400–350 BC
- Berenika Βερενίκα Lete c. 350 BC priestess of Demetra, ritually associated with Stratto, Melis and Lysidika
- Berennô Βερεννὼ of Philistos Φίλιστος Aigai c. 350 BC
- Bila Βίλα of Brateadas Βρατεάδας Aigai c. 350 - 300 BC
- Dexios Δέξιος from Heraclea (Pieria). Pella c. 400 - 350 BC
- Eurydika Εὐρυδίκα daughter of Sirras. Aigai c. 350-300 BC
- Harpalos son of Peucolaos c. 350 BC Πευκόλαος Aigai
- Phylomaga c. 350-300 BC Φυλομάγα Methoni, Pieria c. 350 - 300 BC
- Paton Πάτων son of Laandros Λάανδρος Aigai c. 350-325 BC
- Sabattaras Σαβατταρᾶς hapax, father of proxenos Machatas
- Sillis Σίλλις Aigai c. 350 BC
- Zeidymarchis Ζειδυμαρχίς Pella — 4th/3rd century BC

=== 300-200 BC ===
- Antigonus (son of Callas) hetairos from Amphipolis, commemorates his victory in hoplite racing at Heraclean games after the Conquest of Tyrus.
- Ado Ἀδὼ termed as Makesta, Maketia (Macedonian woman) pilgrim in Delos 302,296 BC
- Attylos Ἀττύλος son of Menandros Beroia 4th/3rd century BC
- Chartas Χάρτας son of Nikanor, hunter Beroia 248 BC
- Erginus (son of Simylus) from Cassandreia citharede winner in Soteria (festival) c. 260 BC
- _ _ (son of Callistratus) from Philippi Dancer winner in Soteria (festival) ~250 BC
- Matero Ματερὼ Bisaltia — Argilos 3rd/2nd century BC

=== 200-100 BC ===
- Bilos Βίλος Beroia 2nd century BC
- Biloitos Βίλοιτος Beroia 2nd/1st century BC
- Boulomaga Βουλομάγα Seleucid or Ptolemaic pilgrim in Delos 185 BC
  - Eulaios Εὐλαῖος father of Lamaga
  - Lamaga Λαμάγα wife
  - Laommas Λαόμμας husband
  - Olympichos Ὀλύμπιχος child. Pydna epitaph early 2nd century BC.
- Laomaga Λαομάγα daughter of Peritos Πέριτος Beroia epitaph c. 150 - 100 BC.
