= Battle of the Hydaspes =

Part of the Indian campaign of Alexander the Great

- Part of Alexander's Indian campaign
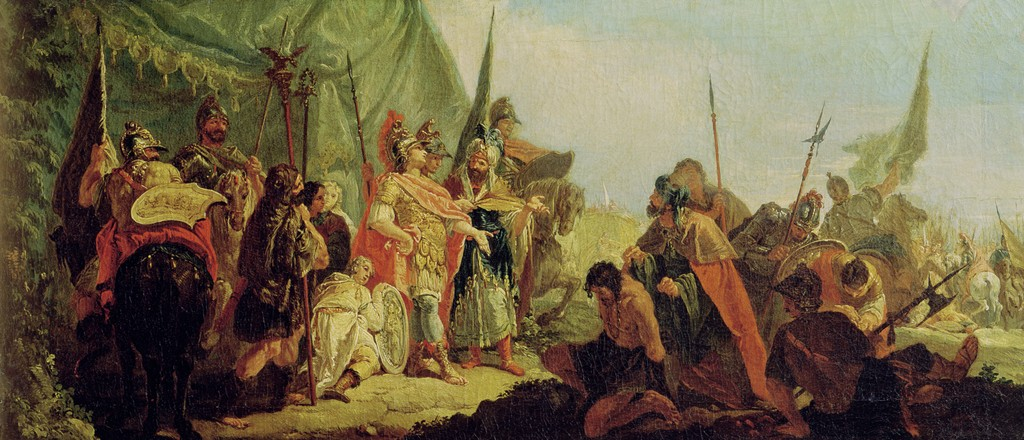
- Alexander the Great and Porus by Francesco Fontebasso
Date	May 326 BC
Location	Hydaspes River (modern-day Jhelum River, Pakistan) 32°49′40″N 73°38′20″E
Result	Macedonian victory
Territorial changes	Macedon annexes most of Punjab, from the Hydaspes to the Hyphasis (Beas River)

Belligerents
Macedonian Empire; Hellenic League; Gandhara	Pauravas

Commanders and leaders
Alexander the Great; Craterus; Coenus; Taxiles	Porus; Spitakes; Sons of Porus

Strength
45,000–47,000 total: 40,000 infantry; 5,000–7,000 cavalry (Note: Lower estimate according to Arrian, higher estimate include another 2,000); Asiatic contingents	22,000–54,000 total: 20,000–50,000 infantry (Note: Several estimates give 20,000, 30,000 and 50,000); 2,000–4,000 cavalry (Note: 2,000 according to Plutarch, 4,000 according to Arrian); 85–200 war elephants (Note: Several estimates include 200, 130 ("likeliest" according to Green), and 85); 1,000 chariots

Casualties and losses
~1,000 total: 80–700 infantry killed; 230–280 cavalry killed	Diodorus; 12,000 killed; 9,000 captured; Arrian; 20,000 infantry killed; 3,000 cavalry killed
- Location within Pakistani Punjab Location within Pakistan Location within Indian subcontinent

Alexander the Great
current battle

The Battle of the Hydaspes also known as Battle of Jhelum, or First Battle of Jhelum, was fought between the Macedonian Empire under Alexander the Great and the Pauravas under Porus in May of 326 BC. It took place on the banks of the Hydaspes River in what is now the Punjab province of Pakistan, as part of Alexander's Indian campaign. In what was possibly their most costly engagement, the Macedonian army secured a decisive victory over the Pauravas and captured Porus. (Note: After more fierce combat Alexander's victory was complete and Porus surrendered.) Large areas of Punjab were subsequently absorbed into the Macedonian Empire; Alexander spared Porus and made him a satrap, effectively reinstating him as the region's ruler.

Despite close surveillance by the Pauravas, Alexander's decision to cross the monsoon-swollen Hydaspes to catch Porus' army in the flank has been called one of his "masterpieces" in combat. The Macedonians' engagement with the Indians at Hydaspes remains a very significant historical event during the Wars of Alexander the Great, as it resulted in the exposure of Greek political and cultural influences to the Indian subcontinent, which would continue to affect Greeks and Indians for centuries to come.

After the battle, Alexander continued his eastward march into modern-day India, intending to cross the Ganges River. However, he stopped at the Hyphasis (now called the Beas) in 326 BC after his weary troops refused to advance further, having campaigned with him for nearly eight years. Arms and armor were wearing out, and there was concern within the army that they could meet disaster in India. The Hyphasis marked the farthest advance of Alexander in India, and upon leaving he "left King Porus in charge of this easternmost territory."

== Background ==
After Alexander defeated the last of the Achaemenid Empire's forces under Bessus and Spitamenes in 328 BC, he began a new campaign to further extend his empire towards India in 327 BC. After fortifying Bactria with 10,000 men, Alexander commenced his invasion of India through the Khyber Pass. Whilst possessing a much larger army, at the battle, an estimated 40,000 infantry and 5,000 cavalry crossed the river in time to engage the enemy. During this battle, Alexander suffered heavy losses compared to his earlier victories.

The primary Greek column entered the Khyber Pass, but a smaller force under the personal command of Alexander went through the northern route, taking the fortress of Aornos (modern-day Pir-Sar) along the way—a place of mythological significance to the Greeks as, according to legend, Herakles had failed to occupy it when he campaigned in India. Here, the Hindu clans of the Hindu Kush gave Alexander's army the toughest opposition they had faced, but Alexander still emerged victorious, despite being outnumbered, depending on the source, somewhere between 3:1 and 5:1.

In early spring of the next year, Alexander formed an alliance with Taxiles (local name Ambhi), the King of Taxila. They combined their forces against Taxiles' neighbour, the King of Hydaspes, Porus the Elder, who had chosen to spurn Alexander's command for him to surrender and was preparing for war. Alexander had to subdue Porus in order to keep marching east. To leave such a strong opponent at his flanks would have endangered any further exploits. Alexander could not afford to show any weakness if he wanted to keep the loyalty of the already subdued Indian princes. Porus had to defend his kingdom and chose the perfect spot to check Alexander's advance. Although he lost the battle, he became Alexander's most successful recorded opponent. According to historian Peter Green, Porus' performance in the battle out-classed both Memnon of Rhodes and Spitamenes.

== Pre-battle manoeuvres ==
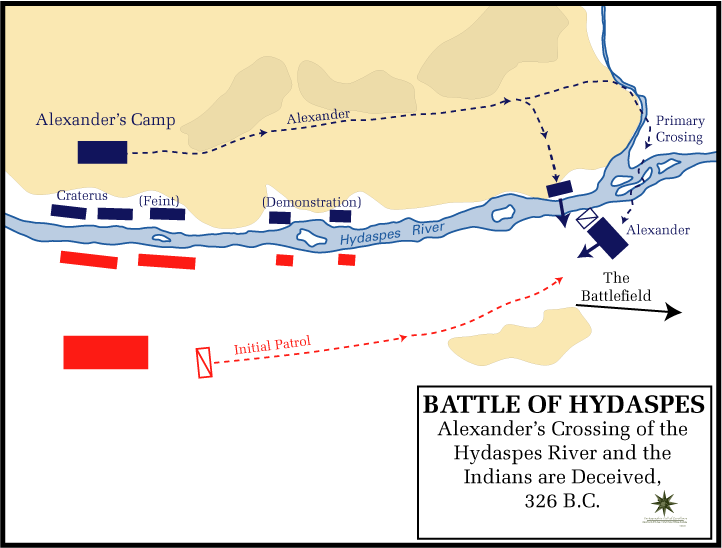
Alexander's crossing of the Hydaspes River.

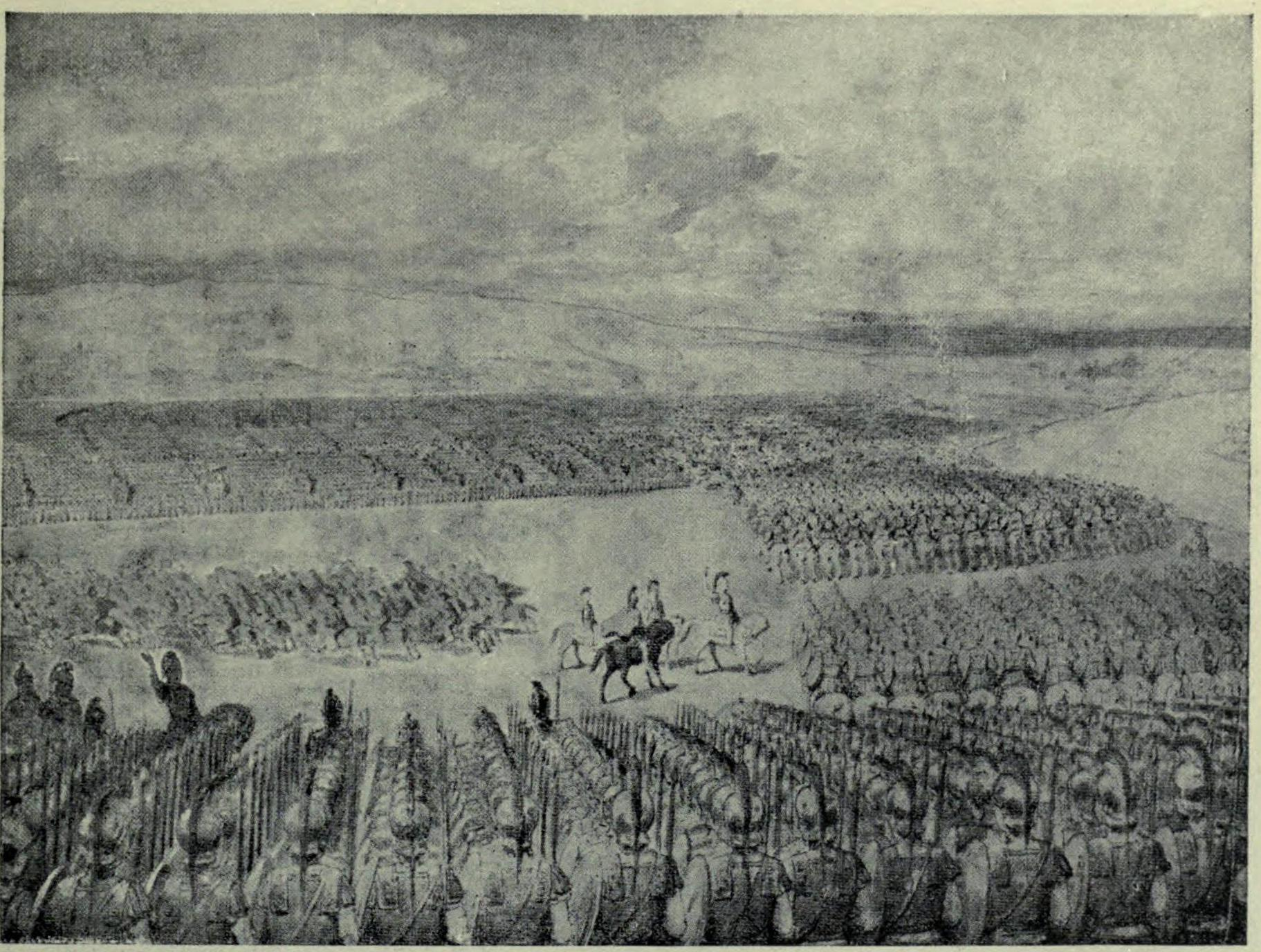
Porus awaits the attack of Alexander July 326 BC.

Alexander fixed his camp on the north banks of the Jhelum River (then called the Hydaspes). In the spring of 326 BC, Porus drew up on the south bank of the Hydaspes to repel any crossing. The Jhelum River was deep and fast enough that any attempt at a crossing would probably doom the attacking force. Alexander knew that a direct approach had little chance of success and tried to find alternative fords. He moved his mounted troops up and down the river bank each night while Porus shadowed him.

Eventually, Alexander found and used a suitable crossing, about 27 km (17 mi) upstream of his camp. This was where an uninhabited, wood-covered island divided the river. While leading his troops across, he landed on the island, while his troops waded across. His plan was a classic pincer manoeuvre. He would eventually attack Indian cavalry flanking both sides of Porus' main force from the right. He left his general, Craterus, behind with most of the army, to make sure Porus would not find out about his crossing, while he crossed the river upstream with a strong contingent, consisting, according to the 2nd century AD Greek historian Arrian, of 6,000 on foot and 5,000 on horseback, though it was probably larger. Craterus was ordered to ford the river and attack if Porus faced Alexander with all his troops or to hold his position if Porus faced Alexander with only part of his army. The other forces commanded by Meleager, Attalus, and Gorgias were ordered to cross the river in various places during the manoeuvre.

Alexander's crossing the Hydaspes in the face of Indian forces on the opposite bank was a notable achievement. The complex preparations for the crossing were accomplished using numerous feints and other forms of deception. Porus was kept continuously on the move until he decided it was a bluff and relaxed. On every visit to the crossing site, Alexander made a detour inland to maintain the secrecy of the plan. It was also reported that an Alexander look-alike held sway in a mock royal tent near the base.

Alexander quietly moved his part of the army upstream and then traversed the river in utmost secrecy, using 'skin floats filled with hay' as well as 'smaller vessels cut in half, the thirty oared galleys into three'. Furthermore, Craterus engaged in frequent feints suggesting that he may cross the river. As a result, Porus, 'no longer expecting a sudden attempt under cover of darkness, was lulled into a sense of security.' Alexander mistakenly landed on an island, but soon crossed to the other side. Porus perceived his opponent's manoeuvre and sent a small cavalry and chariot force under his son, also named Porus, to fight them off, hoping that he could prevent his crossing. By chance, a storm occurred that night, which drowned out the sounds of the crossing.

Having crossed the river, Alexander advanced towards the location of Porus' camp with all his horsemen and foot archers, leaving his phalanx to follow up behind. Upon meeting with young Porus' force, his horse archers showered the latter with arrows, while his heavy cavalry immediately charged without forming into line of battle. Young Porus also faced an unexpected disadvantage: his chariots were immobilized by the mud near the shore of the river. His small force was completely routed by Alexander's outnumbering cavalry, and he died. As news reached the elder Porus, he understood that Alexander had crossed to his side of the river and hastened to face him with the best part of his army, leaving behind a small detachment to disrupt the landing of Craterus' force should he attempt to cross the river.

== Battle ==
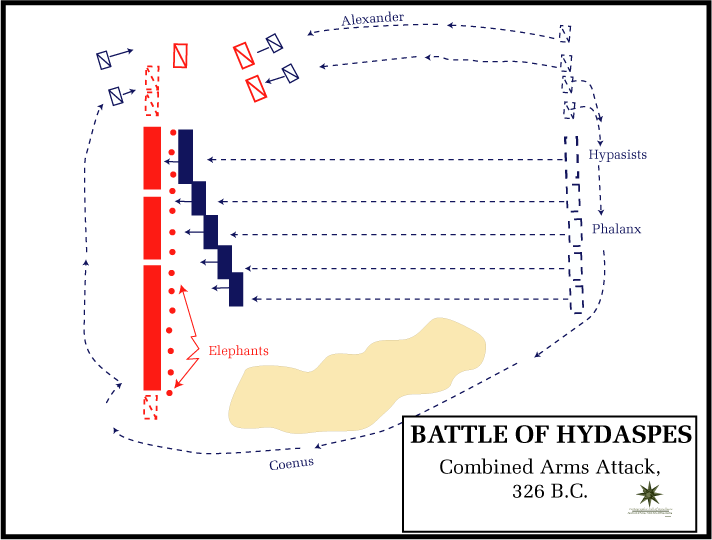
Combined attack of cavalry and infantry.

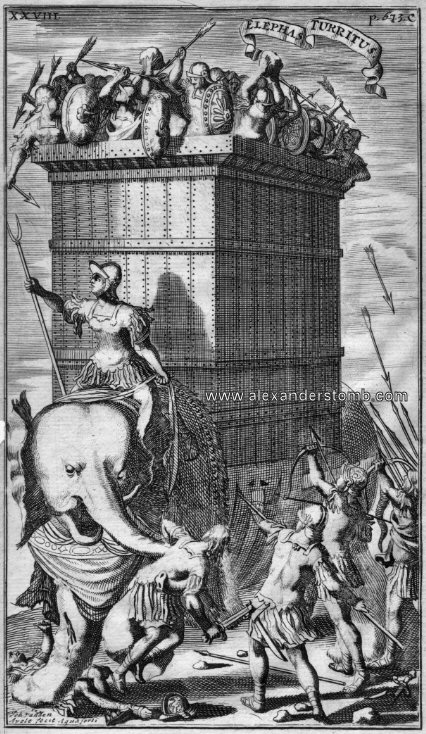
An imagined Indian war elephant against Alexander's army, by Johannes van den Avele

Eventually the two forces met and arrayed themselves for the battle. The Indians were poised with cavalry on both flanks, fronted by their chariots, while their center comprising infantry with war elephants stationed every fifty feet in front of them, to deter the Macedonian cavalry. The Indian war elephants were heavily armoured and had castle-like howdahs on their back carrying a trio of archers and javelin men. Porus' soldiers were dressed in flamboyantly hued outfits with steel helmets, bright scarves and baldrics, and wielded axes, lances and maces. Porus, eschewing the usual tradition of Indian kings fighting from a chariot, was mounted atop his tallest war elephant. This animal in particular was not equipped with a howdah, as the king was clad in chain mail armour and hence had no need of the additional protection of a tower.

Alexander, noticing that Porus' disposition was strongest in the center, decided to attack with his cavalry first on the flanks, having his phalanx hold back until the Indian cavalry had been neutralized. The Macedonian heavy infantry phalanx were outnumbered 1:5 against the Indian infantry. However the latter were at significant disadvantage in close combat due to their lack of armour and the long reach of their opponent's sarissas. Even their heavy armour-piercing bows were inaccurate because of the slippery ground, though the muddy ground was also an advantage to the lighter-armored Indians.

Alexander commenced the battle by sending his Dahae horse archers to harass the Indian right-wing cavalry. His armoured Companion cavalry was sent to attack their outnumbered Indian counterparts on the left wing, with Alexander himself leading the charge as was his habit. The rest of the Indian cavalry galloped to the aid of their hard-pressed kinsmen from the right wing, but Coenus's squadrons promptly followed their movement and attacked them from the rear. The Indian horsemen tried to form a double phalanx to face both attacks, but the necessary complicated manoeuvres brought even more confusion into their ranks, making it easier for the Macedonian cavalry to defeat them. The Indian cavalry were thus routed, and fled to the safety of their elephants.

The war elephants now advanced against the Macedonian cavalry, only to be confronted by the Macedonian phalanx. The powerful beasts caused heavy losses among the Macedonian foot, impaling many men with their steel-clad tusks and heaving some of them into the air before pulverizing them, and trampling and disorganizing their dense lines. Nevertheless, the Macedonian infantry resisted the attack bravely, with light infantry who tossed javelins at the elephants' mahouts and eyes while the heavy infantry attempted to hamstring the elephants with the two-sided axes and kopis. Meanwhile, the Indian horsemen attempted another sally, only to be repulsed once again by Alexander's cavalry squadrons, who had all massed together. The elephants were eventually repulsed and fled back to their own lines. Many of their mahouts had been struck down by Macedonian missiles before they could kill their panicked mounts with poisoned rods, and hence the maddened animals wrought enormous havoc, trampling many of their own infantry and cavalry to death. Finally, the Macedonian pezhetairoi locked their shields and advanced upon the confused enemy mass, while the Macedonian cavalry charged from the rear in a classic "hammer and anvil" manoeuvre, putting the entire Indian army to rout. Meanwhile, Craterus and his force in the base camp had succeeded in crossing the river, and arriving just at the right moment proceed to conduct a thorough pursuit on the fleeing Indians.

Throughout the battle, Alexander is said to have observed with growing admiration the valour of Porus, and understood that Porus intended to die in combat rather than be captured. Hoping to save the life of such a competent leader and warrior, Alexander commanded Taxiles to summon Porus for surrender. However, Porus became enraged on the very sight of his nemesis and tossed a spear at him in fury without bothering to listen to his proposal. Porus' aggressive response forced Taxiles to take flight on his steed. In a similar manner, many other messengers dispatched by the determined Alexander were spurned until at last Meroes, a personal friend of Porus, convinced him to listen to Alexander's message. Overpowered by thirst, the weary Porus finally dismounted his war elephant and demanded water. After being refreshed, he allowed himself to be taken to Alexander. On hearing that the Indian King was approaching, Alexander himself rode out to meet him and the famous surrender meeting took place.

According to Arrian, Macedonian losses amounted to 80 foot soldiers, ten horse archers, twenty of the Companions and 200 other horsemen. However the military historian J.F.C. Fuller saw Diodorus' report of casualties of 1000 men killed as more realistic. This was certainly a high figure for the victorious army, and more than the Macedonian losses at Gaugamela, yet not improbable considering the partial success of the Indian war elephants. Indian losses amounted to 23,000 according to Arrian, 12,000 dead and over 9,000 men captured according to Diodorus. The last two numbers are remarkably close, so it might be assumed that Arrian added any prisoners to the total Indian casualties. Among the Indian leadership, two sons of Porus and his relative and ally Spitakes were killed during the battle, as well as most of his chieftains. Around 80 elephants were captured alive. Alexander also acquired an additional 70 war elephants due to the late arrival of reinforcements called for by King Porus after the battle was already over, who readily surrendered and offered these beasts as a tribute.

== Aftermath and legacy ==
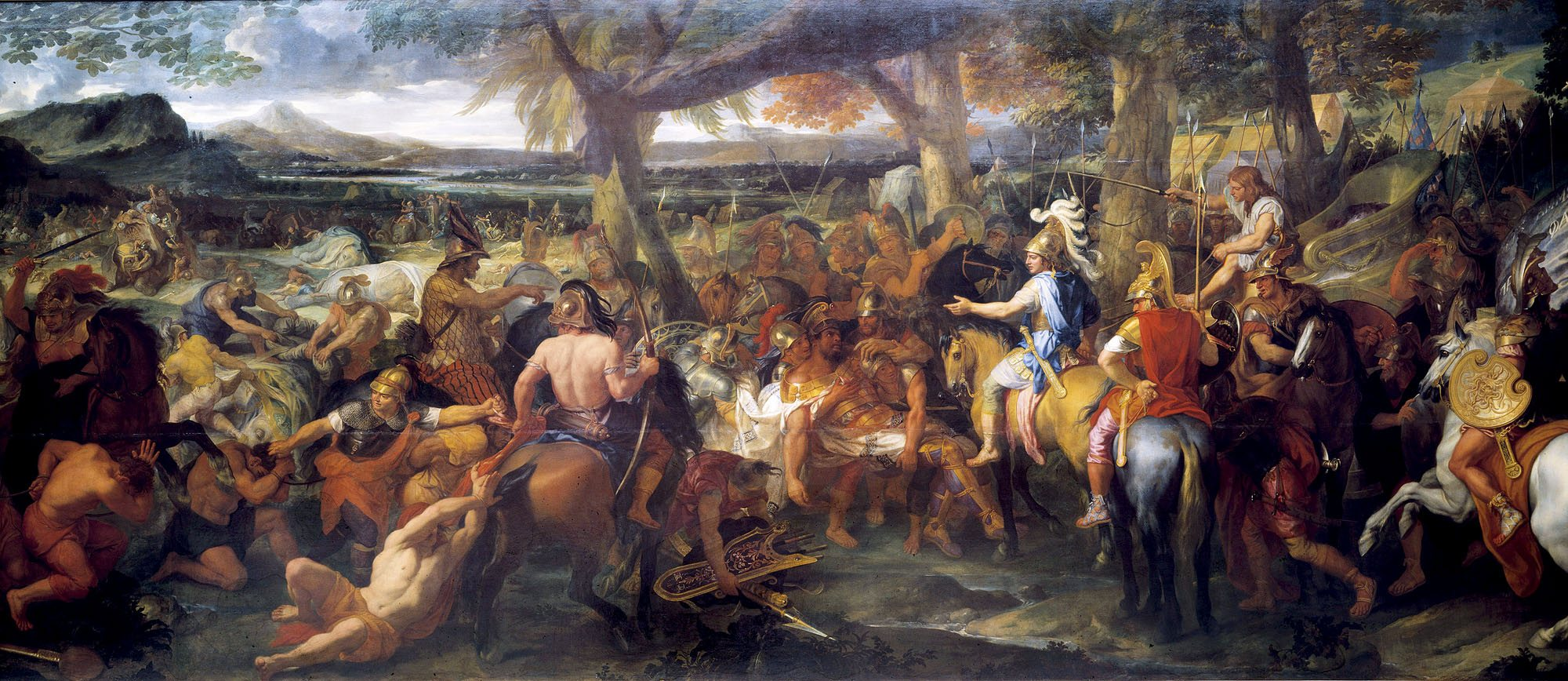
A painting by Charles Le Brun depicting Alexander and Porus during the Battle of the Hydaspes.

When asked by Alexander how he wished to be treated, Porus replied "Treat me as a king would treat another king". Impressed, Alexander indeed treated him like a king, allowing him to retain his lands. Following the battle, Alexander founded two cities called Boukephala and Nikaia, the latter at the site of the battle and named after the Greek word for victory, Nike, in commemoration of his success, and the former on the opposite bank to honour his faithful steed Bucephalus, who died during or after the battle.

In 326 BC, Alexander's army approached the boundaries of the Nanda Empire. His army, exhausted from the continuous campaigning and concerned at the prospect of facing yet another gigantic Indian army, demanded that they should return to the west. This happened at the Hyphasis (modern Beas). Historians do not consider that this action by Alexander's troops represented a mutiny but called it an increase in military unrest amongst the troops, which forced Alexander to finally give in. Instead of immediately turning back, however, he ordered the army to march south, along the Indus, securing the banks of the river as the borders of his empire.

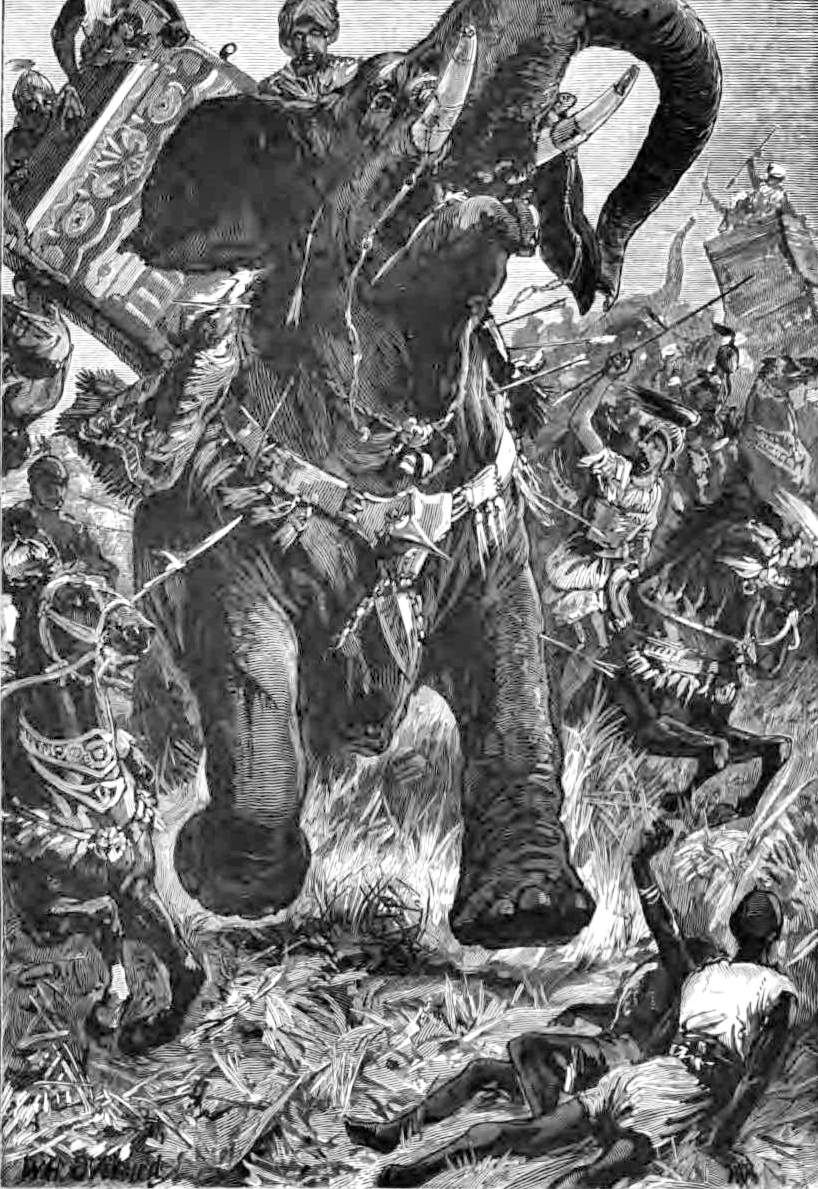
Defeat of Porus by the Macedonians.

The main reasons for Porus' defeat were Alexander's use of clever tactics, and the Macedonians' superior discipline and technology. The Indians used chariots which were inferior to the Greek's cavalry. They did not have a well supported military infrastructure or a standing army. The Indian infantry and cavalry were poorly armoured, lacking in metal armour, and their swords were no match against the sarissa of the Macedonians. Porus himself failed to take the initiative, mainly trying to counter his opponent's moves. Greek historians agree that Porus fought bravely until the end.

During the later rule of the Maurya Empire, tactician Kautilya took the Battle of the Hydaspes as a lesson and highlighted the need for military training before battle. The first Mauryan emperor, Chandragupta, maintained a standing army. The chariot corps played a marginal role in Mauryan military infrastructure.

== See also ==
- Seleucid–Mauryan war
- Mallian campaign
- Indian campaign of Alexander the Great
