= Andromenes =

Andromenes (Ancient Greek: Ἀνδρομένης) may refer to:

- Andromenes (Macedonian), a Macedonian nobleman and father of four sons: Amyntas, Attalus, Polemon and Simmias
- Andromenes of Corinth, Olympic stadion winner in 304 and 308
