= Androsthenes of Thasos =

Androsthenes (Ancient Greek: Ἀνδροσθένης; literally meaning: "Man's Strength") of Thasos, son of Callistratus, was one of the admirals of Alexander the Great. He sailed as a trierarch with Nearchus, and was also sent by Alexander down the Euphrates to explore the coast of the Persian Gulf, skirting the coast of Arabia in a triacontor and sailing further than Archias of Pella. He wrote an account of this voyage, titled The Navigation of the Indian sea ('Ὁ τῆς Ἰνδικῆς παραπλοῦς). Very few fragments remain, it is possible Eratosthenes was the last person to read it in full.

== Fragments ==
Strabo, Geography 16.3.2

The Persian Gulf has the name also of the Sea of Persia. Eratosthenes speaks of it in this manner: “They say that the mouth is so narrow, that from Harmozi, the promontory of Carmania, may be seen the promontory at Mace, in Arabia. From the mouth, the coast on the right hand is circular, and at first inclines a little from Carmania towards the east, then to the north, and afterwards to the west as far as Teredon and the mouth of the Euphrates. In an extent of about 10,000 stadia, it comprises the coast of the Carmanians, Persians, and Susians, and in part of the Babylonians. (Of these we ourselves have before spoken.) Hence directly as far as the mouth are 10,000 stadia more, according, it is said, to the computation of Androsthenes of Thasos, who not only had accompanied Nearchus, but had also alone sailed along the seacoast of Arabia. It is hence evident that this sea is little inferior in size to the Euxine.” He says that Androsthenes, who had navigated the gulf with a fleet, relates, that in sailing from Teredon with the continent on the right hand, an island Icaros is met with, lying in front, which contained a temple sacred to Apollo, and an oracle of [Diana] Tauropolus.

Athenaeus, Deipnosophists 3.45

Androsthenes, also, in the Voyage round India, writes as follows: “The varieties of spiral shell-fish, sea-mussels, and other cockles are numerous, and they differ greatly from those we know at home. Purple-shells, and a vast number of other shell-fish as well, occur there. One in particular, which the natives call berberi, or mother-of-pearl, is that from which the pearl comes. This is of high value in Asia Minor, and in Persia and Upper Asia is sold for its weight in gold. This mollusk looks like the scallop; its shell, however, is not grooved, but is smooth and thick; unlike the scallop, moreover, it has but one auricula, not two. The jewel occurs in the flesh of the mollusk, like the tubercle in swine, and is sometimes so very golden in appearance that when placed side by side with gold it cannot be readily distinguished from it; sometimes, again, it is silvery, and sometimes perfectly white, resembling the eye of a fish.”
