= Pezhetairos =

Ancient Macedonian soldiers

The pezhetairoi (Greek: πεζέταιροι, singular: pezhetairos) were the backbone of the Macedonian army and Diadochi kingdoms. They were literally called "foot companions" (in Greek, pezos means "pedestrian" and hetairos means "companion" or "friend").

The Macedonian phalanxes were made up almost entirely of pezhetairoi. Pezhetairoi were very effective against both enemy cavalry and infantry, as their long pikes could be used to impale enemies charging on horseback or to keep enemy infantry with shorter weapons at bay.

== Description ==
The pezhetairoi were the battalions of the Macedonian phalanx. They first came to prominence during the reign of Philip II, particularly when they played important role in Philip's subjugation of Greece at the Battle of Chaeronea in 338 BC. Philip created this unit by lengthening the spear to the point of becoming a true pike, removing the heavy armor, and replacing the large shield with a smaller alternative. They were armed with the sarissa, a long spear with a shaft made from flexible cornel wood, which had a much longer reach than the traditional hoplite spear. Because of its length, the phalanx could present the spearpoints of around five files of men; which made the phalanx almost impenetrable, and fearsome to oppose.

The name "foot companions" was coined by Alexander III during the reign of his father Philip II as a recruiting method. By labeling his infantry as his personal "companions" and "friends," Philip was able to engage a wider manpower base for his subsequent military campaigns, as positions in his personal infantry would denote pride and honor.

Tactically, the pezhetairoi were best used as a strong defensive line, rather than as shock troops. The length of the sarissa, while making them terrifying for an enemy to oppose, severely limited their maneuverability; and if they were taken in flank or rear they had little chance of responding. This was particularly clear at the Battle of Gaugamela in 331 BC, when the rapid advance of the right wing caused a breach to open between two of the battalions of pezhetairoi—a force of enemy cavalry broke through and, had it not been for a lack of discipline in their own command, under Parmenion, and for Alexander's placing of a second line of traditional hoplites in reserve, the phalanx might have been destroyed from the rear.

Apart from in pitched battles, the pezhetairoi and their sarissas were not very practical; it is supposed that they were re-armed, and their tactics adapted, to suit the guerrilla warfare that was prevalent, and necessary, in Bactria and Sogdia.

== Asthetairoi ==
There is a separate group of Pezhetairoi called Asthetairoi (singular Asthetairos). There is a debate as it is not fully clear what the prefix asth- (Greek: ασθ-) is referring to. Some claim it comes from asty (= city) or asthoi (= townsmen), which would mean the Asthetairoi were recruited from cities. But the units referred to as Asthetairoi were recruited in northern Macedonia, where there are just a few cities. Another suggestion is that asth- comes from aristoi (= the best) and thus implying they were some kind of elite. This would correspond to the fact that they were placed on the right side next to the hypaspists. The common conception is that Asthetairoi means 'closest companion' in terms of kinship and designated units from Upper Macedonia. Another explanation is that 'close' is referring to their position in battle, as they were the closest to the king. For fighting near the Hypaspists it is possible that they were better trained and equipped than normal Pezhetairoi.

== Battalions ==
The battalions of pezhetairoi appear to have been organised on a regional basis, at least to begin with. We know of battalions named for the regions of Orestis/Lyncestis (two battalions probably combining men from both regions), Elimaea and Tymphaea—if all pezhetairoi were from Upper Macedonia then we would expect the other battalions to have represented Eordaea and Pelagonia. In 334 BC Alexander the Great took six battalions of pezhetairoi with him to Asia. By the time the army moved into India in 327 BC, a seventh battalion had been added.

- At the Battle of the Granicus the battalions were those of (from right to left): Perdiccas, Coenus, Amyntas, Philip, Meleager, and Craterus.
- At the Battle of Issus the battalions were those of (from right to left): Coenus, Perdiccas, Craterus, Meleager, Ptolemy (replacing Philip), Amyntas.
- At the Battle of Gaugamela the battalions were those of (from right to left): Coenus, Perdiccas, Meleager, Polyperchon (replacing Ptolemy), Simmias (deputising for Amyntas, who was recruiting in Macedonia), Craterus.
- At the Battle of the Hydaspes River only five battalions took part, and were those of (from right to left): Antigenes, Clitus the White, Meleager, Attalus, Gorgias. The other battalions (those of Polyperchon and Alcetas) remained on the western bank of the Hydaspes, under the command of Craterus, and crossed only when Alexander was victorious, in order to continue with the pursuit of the fleeing Indians. However, there is much supposition and guesswork regarding this battle.

== See also ==
- Peltast
