= Sitalces II =

4th-century BC Thracian general

Sitalces (Ancient Greek: Σιτάλκης; died 325 BC) was apparently a prince of the Odrysian royal house, possibly even the son of Cersobleptes. He was leader of a body of Thracian light-armed troops (javelin-men, akontistai), who accompanied Alexander the Great as auxiliaries on his expedition to Asia. They played a valuable role in various battles, including the battles of Issus and Arbela. Alexander took the sons of Thracian kings with him to ensure the loyalty of their fathers at home.

Sitalces was one of the officers left behind in Media under the command of Parmenion where he received, through the agency of Polydamas, royal orders to kill Parmenion. He remained in Media until after the return of Alexander from India in 326 BC, when he, along with Cleander and Heracon prepared to meet the king in Carmania. Following his arrival in Carmania a number of people from Media accused him of numerous acts of rape, extortion, and cruelty. It was on these charges he was later put to death on the orders of Alexander.
