= Nicarchides =

Nicarchides from Pydna, son of Simus, was a general of Alexander the Great. In 331/0 he was appointed phrourarchos of Persepolis and placed in charge of a garrison of 3,000 men. Nicarchides was also trierarch of the Hydaspes fleet of Nearchus.
