= Asclepiodorus of Macedon =

4th-century BC Macedonian general

Asclepiodorus (/əˌskliːpioʊˈdɔːrəs/; Ancient Greek: Ἀσκληπιόδωρος) a Macedonian, son of Timander, was one of the generals of Alexander the Great, and after the conquest of Syria was appointed by Alexander satrap of that country. In 328 BC, he led reinforcements from Syria to Alexander in eastern Asia, and there became involved in the conspiracy which was formed by Hermolaus against the life of the king. He seems to be the same as the one whom Antigonus, in 316, made satrap of Persia; but he must be distinguished from an Asclepiodorus, a general of Cassander, mentioned by Diodorus.

Ascepiodorus was also secretary of Eurydice III of Macedon and an appointed trierarch of Nearchus in 326.
