= Heracles Patroos =

Epithet of Heracles

Heracles Patroos (Πατρῷος ancestor) is the divine epithet of Heracles in ancient Macedonia. A throne in Vergina palace, probably religious in function, is dedicated to Heracles Patroos. Patroos is also an epithet of Apollo and Zeus in other regions of ancient Greece.

Θεῶι Πατρώιωι Ἡρακλ[εῖ] To God Ancestor Heracles

== See also ==
- Caranus (king)
- Antigonus (son of Callas)
- Temple of Apollo Patroos
