= Onomastus (disambiguation) =

Onomastus is a genus of jumping spiders.

Onomastus may also refer to:

- Onomastus of Macedon (fl. 185 BC), an ancient Greek officer
- Onomastus of Smyrna (fl. 688 BC), an ancient Greek boxer
- Onomastus of Elis (fl. 6th century BC), son of Agaeus, according to Herodotus, one of the many Greek suitors who came to court Agariste of Sicyon
