= Adymus =

Adymus or Adymos may refer to:

- Adymus, brother of Europa, worshipped along with Britomartis
- Adymus of Beroea (fl. 1st century AD), Macedonian sculptor
- Another name of Phaethon of Syria, guardian of the temples of Aphrodite
