= Heracon =

Heracon (Ancient Greek: Ἡράκων) officer in the service of Alexander the Great, who, together with Cleander, Agathon and Sitalces II, succeeded to the command of the army in Media, which had previously been under the orders of Parmenion, when the latter was put to death by order of Alexander, 330 BC. In common with many others of the Macedonian governors, he permitted himself many excesses during the absence of Alexander in the remote provinces of the East: among others he plundered a temple at Susa, noted for its wealth, on which charge he was put to death by Alexander after his return from India, 325 BC.
