= Onesimus (disambiguation) =

Onesimus, bishop of Byzantium (a runaway slave and early Christian convert mentioned in the New Testament of the Christian Bible).

Onesimus may also refer to:

- Onesimos (vase painter) (fl. c. 505 – c. 480 BCE)
- Onesimus (son of Python), 2nd century Macedonian noble
- Onesimus of Soissons 4th century bishop and saint
- Onesimus (Bostonian) (1600s – 1700s), enslaved African man in Boston who advocated smallpox inoculation
- Onesimus Ustonson (1736 – c. 1783), British manufacturer of fishing tackle
- Onesimos Nesib (c. 1856 – 1931), translator of the Bible into the Ethiopian Oromo language
- Onesimus "Ness" Edwards (1897 – 1968), British politician
- Onesimus (1882), book by Edwin Abbott Abbott

== See also ==
- Anisim
