= Timanthes of Pella =

Timanthes (Greek: Τιμάνθης) of Pella, son of Pantiades was one of the trierarchs on the Hydaspes fleet of Nearchus in 326 BC.
