= Chrysogonus of Macedon =

Friend and military general of Macedonian King Philip V (r. 221–179 BC)

- Known for: Friendship with Philip V

Chrysogonus was a close friend and military general of the Macedonian king Philip V (r. 221–179 BC). He is recorded as coming from Edessa and was likely from a Macedonian noble family. Chrysogonus was employed both in war and in peace, and possessed great influence with the King, which he seems to have exercised in an honourable manner, for the Greek historian Polybius says that Philip was most merciful when he followed his advice. His two sons, Pyrrhichos and the court poet Samus, were executed by Philip in 183 BC as conspirators against the king.

== See also ==
- List of ancient Macedonians
