= Chrysogonus =

Chrysogonus ("golden birth") was the name of the following people:

- Chrysogonus of Athens (c. 407 BC), flautist and poet
- Chrysogonus of Macedon (2nd century BC), nobleman and general, father of poet Samus
- Lucius Cornelius Chrysogonus (1st century BC), Greek freedman
- Saint Chrysogonus (4th century AD), Christian martyr
