= Demonicus of Pella =

Demonicus of Pella (Ancient Greek: Δημόνικος), son of Athenaeus, was presumably one of Alexander's hetairoi and served in 326 BC as a trierarch of the Hydaspes fleet of Nearchus.
