= Archelaus (phrourarch) =

Archelaus was a Macedonian phrourarch of Tyre appointed by Perdiccas or Alexander in 323-321 BC. Perdiccas had left 800 talents with him in 321 BC for safe keeping, which he turned over to Attalus (son of Andromenes) after Perdiccas' death along with the affairs of the city.
