= Gorgias of Macedon =

General of Alexander the Great

Gorgias (Ancient Greek: Γοργίας) was one of Alexander's officers, among those who were brought reluctantly from Macedonia by Amyntas (son of Andromenes), when he was sent home to collect levies in 332 BC. Gorgias was one of the commanders left by Alexander in Bactria to complete the reduction of the Bactrian insurgents, and to check further rebellion, while the king himself marched to quell the revolt in Sogdiana, 328 BC. He accompanied Alexander in his Indian expedition, and, together with Attalus (son of Andromenes) and Meleager, commanded the mercenaries at the passage of the Hydaspes against Porus in 326 BC. This is perhaps the same Gorgias whose name occurs in Justin (xii. 12) among the veterans whom Alexander sent home under Craterus in 324 BC; and, in that ease, he must be distinguished from the Gorgias who is mentioned by Plutarch (Eum. 7) as one of the officers of Eumenes in his battle against Craterus and Neoptolemus in Cappadocia in 321 BC
