= Hellotia =

Hellotia and Ellotia (Ancient Greek: ἐλλώτια or ἑλλώτια) was:

1. an epithet of Athena and also the name of the festival in honour of this Athena at Corinth .
2. a festival in honour of Europa in Crete.

== Athena ==
According to the scholiast on Pindar (Ol. xiii. 56), the name was derived from the fertile marsh (έλος, helos) near Marathon, where Athena had a sanctuary; or from Hellotia, one of the daughters of Timander, who fled into the temple of Athena when Corinth was burnt down by the Dorians, and was destroyed in the temple with her sister Eurytione. Soon after, a plague broke out at Corinth, and the oracle declared that it should not cease until the souls of the maidens were propitiated, and a sanctuary should be erected to Athena Hellotis.

Hellotia was the name of the festival with a torch race celebrated at Corinth in honour of Athena.

== Europa ==
According to Seleucus, the festival took its name from hellotis (ἑλλωτίς), a myrtle garland which was carried about in the procession at the festival.

The Dictionary of Greek and Roman Biography and Mythology writes that Hellotis (Ἑλλωτίς) was a surname of Europe in Crete, with that being the reason for the festival being called Hellotia.
