= Attalus of Macedonia =

Attalus of Macedonia may refer to:

- Attalus (general) of Philip and Alexander
- Attalus (son of Andromenes) of Alexander and Perdiccas
