= Metron of Pydna =

Metron (Greek: Μέτρων) was the son of Epicharmus from Pydna. He was a hetairos and trierarch of the Hydaspes fleet of Nearchus. He may be identical with Metron, one of the royal pages (paides basilikoi).
