= Anisim =

Anisim or Onisim is a Church Slavonic rendering of the Greek name Ancient Greek: Ὀνήσιμος, i.e., Onesimus. As such, it is used an East Slavic given name and a Romanian surname. It gave rise to the patronymic surname Anisimov/Onisimov. Notable people with the name include:

- Onisim of the Caves, Kyiv saint
- Onisim Bron (1895–1975), Soviet conductor
- Onisim Kler, Russian name of Onésime Clerc (1845–1920), Russian naturalist of Swiss origin
- Alena Anisim, Belarusian linguist and opposition politician
- Iosif Anisim, Romanian sprint canoeist

== See also ==
- Onesimus (disambiguation)
