= Mylleas =

Mylleas (perhaps Myllenas) son of Zoilus was a Beroean trierarch of Nearchus appointed by Alexander the Great. Possibly father of a certain Alexander.
