= Evander =

Evander is a masculine given name. It is an anglicization of the Greek name Εὔανδρος (lit. 'good man', Latinized Evandrus). It has also been adopted as an anglicization of the Gaelic name Ìomhar (the Gaelic variant of the name Ivor). Evandro is the Italian, Portuguese and Spanish version. People and mythological figures named Evander include:

== Ancient world ==
- Evander (mythology), three figures in Greek or Roman mythology
- Evander (philosopher) (3rd century–2nd century BC), Greek philosopher and joint leader of the Platonic Academy at Athens with Telecles
- Evander of Beroea, first century sculptor

== Modern era ==
- Evander (footballer) (born 1998), Evander da Silva Ferreira, Brazilian footballer
- Evander Holyfield (born 1962), American retired world champion heavyweight boxer
- Evander Ziggy Hood (born 1987), American National Football League player
- Evander Kane (born 1991), Canadian National Hockey League player
- Evander M. Law (1836–1920), American Civil War Confederate general
- Evander Bradley McGilvary (1864–1953), American philosophical scholar
- Evander McNair (1820–1902), American Civil War Confederate brigadier general
- Evander Shapard (1897–1977), American World War I flying ace
- Evander Sno (born 1987), Dutch footballer
- Evander Berry Wall (1860–1940), New York City socialite and later American expatriate in France
