= Parmenion (disambiguation) =

Parmenion or Parmenio may refer to:

- Parmenion high general of Philip and Alexander
- Parmenion (architect) in Alexandria (4th-3rd century BC)
- Parmenion (poet) of Greek Anthology
