= Pantordanus =

Ancient Macedonian officer

Pantordanus or Pantordanos (Greek: Παντόρδανος), son of Cleander, was hipparch of the ile of Hetairoi of Leugaea from the beginning of the campaign of Alexander the Great. At the Battle of Issus, he occupied at first the left wing but then being transferred (along with the squadron of Peroidas) to the right, just as the battle began (A 2.9.3). Nothing further is known of him. At the battle of Gaugamela both Peroidas and Pantordanus had been replaced.
