= Polemocrates of Elimeia =

Father of Macedonian general Coenus

Polemocrates (Ancient Greek: Πολεμοκράτης) from Elimeia was father of Macedonian general Coenus and of a commander Cleander. Polemocrates had been allotted estates in Chalcidice in the reign of Philip II of Macedon.
