= On the Navy Boards =

Oration by Demosthenes

"On the Navy Boards" or "On the Symmories" (Ancient Greek: Περὶ τῶν Συμμοριῶν) is the first surviving political oration of the prominent Athenian statesman and orator Demosthenes. A reference to the speech made in Demosthenes' later On the Liberty of the Rhodians proves that the speech was actually delivered to the Ecclesia, not just composed but never spoken. According to Dionysius of Hallicarnassus, the speech was delivered in 354/3 BC.

On the Navy Boards is a speech of general interest, which provided Demosthenes an opportunity to be an advocate for common sense. The ecclesia had convened to consider a rumored threat against Athens by the Great King of Persia. The orator espoused moderation and did not endeavor to rouse the hot-blooded ones of his audience against the Persians. He advocated avoiding any provocation, but he also proposed a well-organised preparation in case of war. For this reason he supported the reform of the "symmoriai" (boards) through which the Athenian fleet was funded. In his first political intervention the young politician did not accomplish his goals. On the Navy has been regarded as artistically inferior to his later political orations.
