= Attinas =

Attinas (Greek: Ἀττίνας) was a Macedonian phrourarchos of a fort in Bactria (329 – 328 BC). The fort was attacked by the Sogdian general Spitamenes and a force of Massagetae, who lured Attinas and his 300 cavalrymen into an ambush and slaughtered them.
