= Trierarchy =

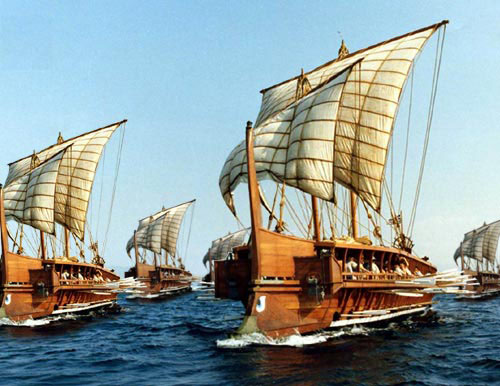
Greek Triremes (Composite pictures of the Olympias, a modern full-size recreation of a Greek Trireme).

A trierarchy (Greek: τριηραρχία, romanized: trierarchia) was a type of obligation called a liturgy, a tax levied on the very wealthy in Ancient Athens requiring the performance of public services. The person upon whom the duty fell is called a trierarch. The responsibility might fall on one person or be shared, in which case it was known as a syntrierarchy. The trierarch was responsible for the outfitting, maintenance, operation and leadership of a warship known as a trireme (triēres). The ship, its equipment, and crew were all provided by the State, although some trierarchs supplied their own equipment and hired their own crew.

== History ==
=== Early history ===
The exact origin of the trierarchy is disputed. The earliest mention of the trierarchy comes from Aristotle who claims the trierarchy dates to at least the tyranny of Hippias (527-510 BCE). In the early 5th century BCE Athens underwent a significant naval buildup, spurred by an increase in silver from the mines of Laurion in 482. By 480 Athens possessed a large fleet of ships and was actively levying the trierarchy.

=== Syntrierarchy ===
The continued use of the trierarchy led to the development of the syntrierarchy or cotrierarchy. Like the system it is born out of the exact origin of the syntrierarchy is difficult to place, although we know it was in use by 408 BCE. It was during this time the trierarchy began being shared by more than one trierarch and may have come about due to the extreme cost associated with performing trierarchic service. The command of the ship would be worked out between two or more individuals in a private agreement. In addition to reducing the cost placed on a single individual the syntrierarchy also widened the pool of potential trierarchs.

=== Reform ===
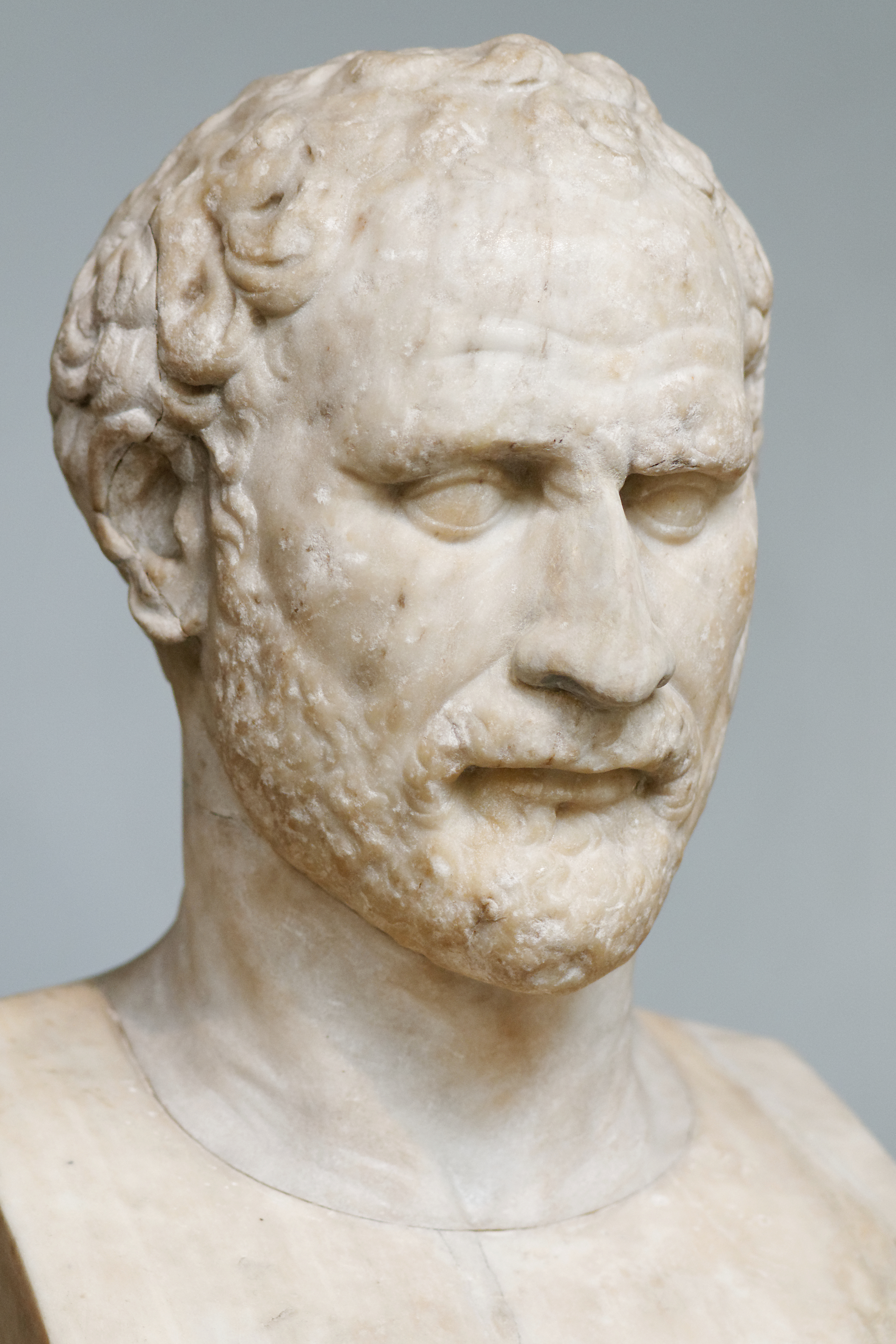
Bust of Demosthenes (384-382 BCE), trierarch who proposed various reforms to the system. (Roman copy of a Greek original sculpted by Polyeuktos).

By the mid 350s BCE the trierarchy was in need of reform. A lack of eligible citizens willing to spend their time and money performing the liturgy led to a law being passed in 358/7 BCE that aimed to restructure the system. The new law, called Periandros's Law, would annually register a group of 1,200 individuals (the synteleis) who were to be called upon to perform trierarchic service. The law further divided the synteleis into twenty divisions (symmoria) of sixty members who were in charge of manning fewer than twenty ships. Although the aim of the reforms was to alleviate the financial burden placed on each trierarch there were still issues with the system, namely that the financial burden was evenly distributed among members of unequal wealth, and that frequently the full 1,200 of the synteleis was not assembled.

The continuing dysfunction of the trierarchic system led to further reform. In 340 BCE Demosthenes brought forward a new law aimed at improving the funding and operation of the trierarchy. The law increased the synteleis from 1200 to 2000 names, divided them into 20 boards of 60 members, which were further subdivided into 12 groups of 5 members each; attaching the poorest contributors to the wealthiest. The law further set the total number of triremes in the navy at 300, assigning 15 to each board, and 3 to each group. Additionally all naval equipment was redistributed among the boards and their groups.

=== Trierarchy in the Third Century BCE ===
Not much is known about the function of the trierarchy from the late 300's BCE. Following the Lamian War (323/2-322/1 BCE) Athens fleet underwent a dramatic reduction in size further exacerbated by the occupation of the Piraeus by the Macedonians from 294 to 224 BCE. Historian Christian Ammitzbøll Thomsen believes that these developments led to a reduction in the number of trierarchs while their function was largely unchanged. A late third century inscription found at Rhamnous, a fortress of strategic importance to the Athenian military, indicates that as late as 224/3 BCE trierarchs were still being appointed to serve for a one-year term.

== The Trierarch ==
=== Athens ===
In order to be eligible for the trierarchy one had to be a wealthy, property owning citizen of Athens. Trierarchs were often called upon at the start of naval expeditions and were required to serve for one year, although sometimes this length of service varied. A trierarch was responsible for the ship, its equipment and crew sometimes providing the latter two themselves. Within the military hierarchy the trierarchs were subordinate to the generals (strategoi), who sometimes divided the fleet among themselves.

==== The Trierarchic Crown ====
The Trierarchic Crown was a prize given by the treasurer to the first trierarch who, after being called up for service, got their ship ready for service. If a trierarch was called up for service and failed to appear by the last day of the prescribed month they were liable to be arrested.

=== Use of the Term Trierarch Outside of Athens ===
The term trierarch was not limited to use in Athens and eventually came to mean the commander of a ship, comparable to the rank of captain. These trierarchs were sometimes a liturgical position and other times were not. In Lebedos and Teos, two Greek city-states located on the Anatolian coast, use of the term trierarch is attested to in papyrus. In these cities the trierarchy was a liturgy much like in Athens. A line from Aristotle indicates that the trieararchic position was present in Rhodes as well. In Ptolemaic Egypt, the Hellenistic kingdom that ruled Egypt from 305 to 30 BCE the term trierarch appears abundantly in papyrus and inscriptions. In contrast to other Greek communities the trierarchs of Ptolemaic Egypt were not performing a liturgical duty and instead were conducting a more normalized form of service. They exercised greater discretion over their crews and received payment directly from the royal treasury in Alexandria.

== The Trireme ==
=== Manning a Trireme ===
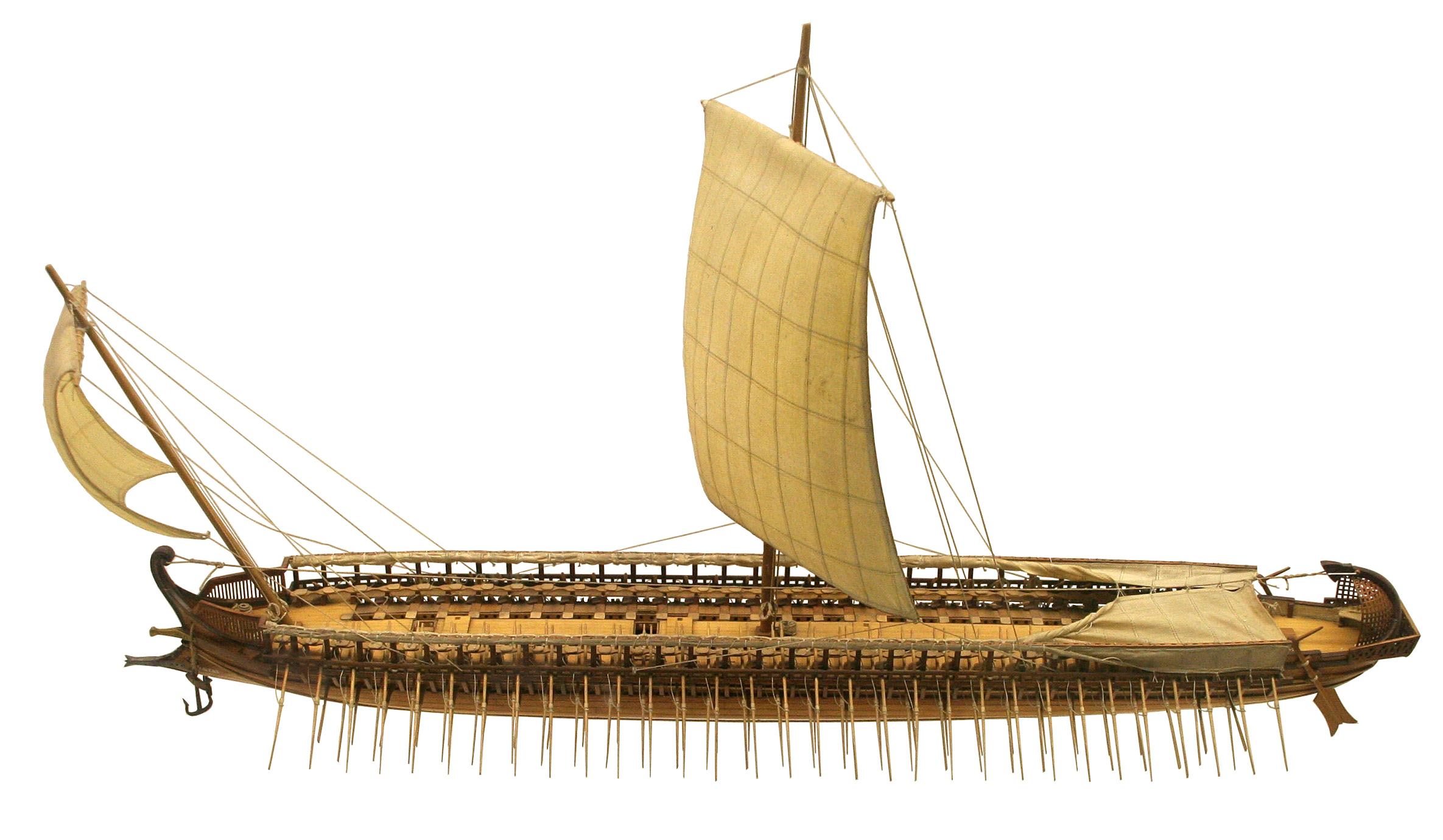
Model of a Greek Trireme.

In ancient Greece the crew of a trireme consisted of 200 sailors including the trierarch, 16 petty officers (hyperesia) a complement of 10-20 marines, with the remainder of the crew being rowers. The crew of a trireme was often assembled through conscription and were paid for their labor. A trierarch could hire their own crew members, often at an increased cost. Crew members were assembled from official lists of individuals and were required to report for service at the start of an expedition. Since crew members were paid for their labor they were liable to desert if not paid, and as a result the trierarch could hire on additional crew members.

==== Hyperesia ====
The hyperesia performed special rolls on board a trireme that were necessary for the functioning of the ship. These included deck hands, a helmsman (kybernetes), a boatswain (keleustēs), a bow officer (prōratēs), a shipwright (naupēgos), a piper (aulētēs) who played to keep the rowers in time, and a number of officers (pentekontarchos) to oversee the separate rowing sections and distribute pay.

=== Cost of Operating a Trireme ===
The cost associated with operating a trireme varied by time and place, in general it cost one talent (26 kilograms of silver) to build a trireme. Each member of the ship's crew was entitled to a daily payment (misthos), ranging from between two obols and one drachma (one drachma = six obols). Assuming that each member of the crew received one drachma per day, and that there were 200 members of the crew, it cost one talent to operate a trireme for one month. A crews pay was provided by the state, sometimes from taxes levied at the start of a naval expedition, although a trierarch could supplement their crews pay or hire more experienced, and therefore more expensive crewmen, at their own expense. The ships improvements that had been funded by a previous trierarch were often left with the ship with the new trierarch(s) being responsible to reimburse the previous trierarch for the improvements.
