= Archias of Pella =

- Occupations: Geographer; Explorer

Archias, son of Anaxidotus from Pella (Greek: Ἀρχίας Ἀναξιδότου Πελλαῖος), was a Macedonian officer and geographer who served as Trierarch under Admiral Nearchus. Archias was despatched with a galley of 30 oars, and reached the island of Failaka (Kuwait) and Tylos (Bahrain group). Tylos, Archias reported, was "about a day and a night's sail" from the mouth of the Euphrates.
