= Anthemus =

Town in ancient Macedonia

Coordinates: 40°25′04″N 23°17′04″E

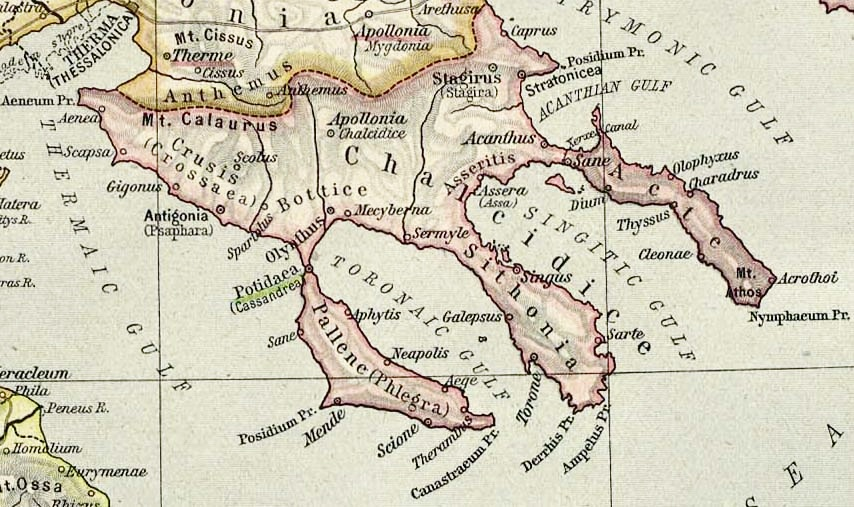
Anthemus between Chalcidice and Mygdonia

Anthemus or Anthemous (Ancient Greek: Ἀνθεμοῦς), also known as Anthemuntus or Anthemountos (Ἀνθεμοῦντος), was a town of ancient Macedonia of some importance, belonging to the early Macedonian monarchy. It appears to have stood southeast of Thessalonica and north of Chalcidice, since we learn from Thucydides that its territory bordered upon Bisaltia, Crestonia and Mygdonia. The territory of the town is first mentioned when Amyntas I of Macedon offered it to Hippias, the son of Athenian tyrant Pisistratus. Hippias refused it, as well as a similar offer from the Thessalians for Iolcos, suggesting that Amyntas probably did not possess Anthemous at that time. It is likely that Amyntas was merely suggesting a plan of joint occupation to Hippias. It was given by Philip of Macedon to the Olynthians. Peroidas commanded the cavalry squadron of Hetairoi from Anthemus in the campaign of Alexander. Like some of the other chief cities in Macedonia, it gave its name to a town in Asia. It continued to be mentioned by writers under the Roman empire.

There was also a district, river, and lake named after the city. The river's modern name is Vasilikotikos.

The site of Anthemus is located near modern Galatista.
