= Polemon (son of Andromenes) =

4th century BCE Macedonian officer, serving Alexander the Great

Polemon (Ancient Greek: Πολέμων; lived 4th century BC), son of Andromenes the Tymphaean, was a Macedonian officer in the service of Alexander the Great (336–323 BC). The great intimacy between him and Philotas caused him to be suspected in 330 BC, together with his brothers Amyntas, Attalus, and Simmias, of participating in the treasonable designs imputed to Philotas: a charge to which Polemon had the imprudence to give countenance by taking to flight immediately on learning the arrest of Philotas. Amyntas, however, who remained, having successfully defended himself before the assembly of the army, also obtained the pardon or acquittal of Polemon.

In the disputes that followed the death of Alexander (323 BC), Polemon, like his brother Attalus, distinguished himself as a warm partisan of Perdiccas. To conciliate the favour of the regent, he ineffectually tried to prevent Arrhidaeus from transporting the body of the deceased monarch to Egypt. He afterwards served under Alcetas, the brother of Perdiccas, and was taken prisoner by Antigonus in Pisidia, together with Attalus and Docimus, 320 BC. From this time he shared the fortunes of Attalus, included their imprisonment, their escape in 317 BC, and their finale capture a year after.
