= Harmost =

Spartan term for a military governor

Harmost (from Ancient Greek ἁρμοστής (harmostḗs) 'joiner, adaptor') was a Spartan term for a military governor. The Spartan general Lysander instituted several harmosts during the period of Spartan hegemony after the end of the Peloponnesian War in 404 BC. They were sent into their subject or conquered towns, partly to keep them in submission, and partly to abolish the democratic form of government, and establish oligarchies instead.

In the peace of Antalcidas the Lacedaemonians pledged to reestablish free governments in their subject towns, but they nevertheless continued to install harmosts in them. Even Xenophon, generally pro-Spartan, censured the Spartans for the manner in which they allowed their harmosts to govern.

It is uncertain how long the office of an harmost lasted; but considering that a governor of the same kind, who was appointed by the Lacedaemonians in Cythera, with the title of Cytherodikes, held his office only for one year, it is not improbable that the office of harmost was of the same duration.

The Thebans also used the term during the Theban hegemony.

There is an earlier use of the word in a scholium to Pindar's odes, but the meaning isn't explained. It has been proposed that these were officials sent as overseers into the Perioeci.

== See also ==
- Episcopi
- Epistates
- Phrourarch
- Dictionary of Greek and Roman Antiquities
