= Samus (poet) =

Samus (Ancient Greek: Σάμος) or Samius or Simmias, son of Chrysogonus was a Macedonian lyric and epigrammatic poet. He was brought up with Philip V, the son of Demetrius, by whom also he was put to death, but for what reason we are not informed. He therefore flourished at the end of the 3rd century BC. Polybius has preserved one of his iambic lines; and two epigrams by him are contained in the Greek Anthology, both on the subject of Philip's exploit in killing the wild bull on Mount Orbelos, on which we have also an epigram by Antipater of Sidon. The name is written in both the above ways, and in the Planudean Anthology both epigrams are ascribed to Simmias doubtless by the common error of substituting a well-known name for one less known.
