= Ptolemy (somatophylax) =

Ptolemy (Ancient Greek: Πτολεμαῖος) was one of the selected officers of Alexander the Great, called somatophylaces. He was killed at the siege of Halicarnassus, 334 BC, commanding two taxeis of Hypaspists, those of Adaeus and Timander.

W Heckel believes that this Ptolemy was not one of the Seven Bodyguards of Alexander, but was the commander of the agema, the Royal Hypaspists who acted as the King's bodyguard in battle. He was succeeded by Admetus, who was killed at Tyre in 332 BC. Hephaestion was probably appointed to succeed Admetus.
