= Peroidas =

Peroidas or Peroedas (Ancient Greek: Περοίδας), son of Menestheus, was hipparch of the ile of Hetairoi from Anthemus from the beginning of the campaign of Alexander the Great. At the Battle of Issus, his squadron was transferred, along with that of Pantordanus, from the left to the right wing before the battle began (Arrian 2.9.3).
