= Apollodorus (runner) =

Apollodorus (Greek: Ἀπολλόδωρος; fl. 1st century AD) was an ancient Macedonian runner who, after winning in the Olympics, was killed by lightning on his way back home. He is commemorated by Antipater of Thessalonica in the below epigram (Greek Anthology 7.390):

Κυλλήνην ὄρος Ἀρκάδων ἀκούεις·
αὕτη σῆμ' ἐπίκειτ' Ἀπολλοδώρῳ.
Πίσηθέν μιν ἰόντα νυκτὸς ὥρῃ
ἔκτεινεν Διόθεν πεσὼν κεραυνός.
τηλοῦ δ' Αἰγανέης τε καὶ Βεροίης
νικηθεὶς Διὸς ὁ δρομεὺς καθεύδει.

You know Cyllene the Arcadian mountain;
That is the monument that covers Apollodorus.
As he returned from Pisa by night
a thunder from Zeus killed him.
Long away from Aiane and Beroia,
beaten by Zeus the runner sleeps.

Every year the Race of Apollodoros (Greek: Δρόμος Απολλοδώρου) is organized in modern Aiani and Veria (Greece).
