= Episkopoi =

Episkopoi (Ancient Greek: ἐπίσκοποι, sing. ἐπίσκοπος, episkopos, literally "overseer"), Latinized episcopus/episcopi, were inspectors who were sometimes sent by the Athenians to subject states. Harpocration compares them to the Lacedaemonian harmosts, and says that they were also called phylakes (φύλακες, "guardians"). It appears that these episkopoi received a salary at the cost of the cities over which they presided.

The term was used in early Christianity to refer to overseers, or bishops, of local churches. It has often been translated as "overseers," "pastors," "shepherds," or "bishops."

== See also ==
- Bishop
- Epistates
