= Arybbas (somatophylax) =

Arybbas (Greek: Αρύββας) was a somatophylax of Alexander the Great. He was probably from Epirus, a member of the Molossian royal house (i.e., a relative of Olympias). He died of illness in Egypt in the winter of 332 BC and was replaced by Leonnatus.
