= Somatophylakes =

Bodyguards of high-ranking people in Ancient Greece

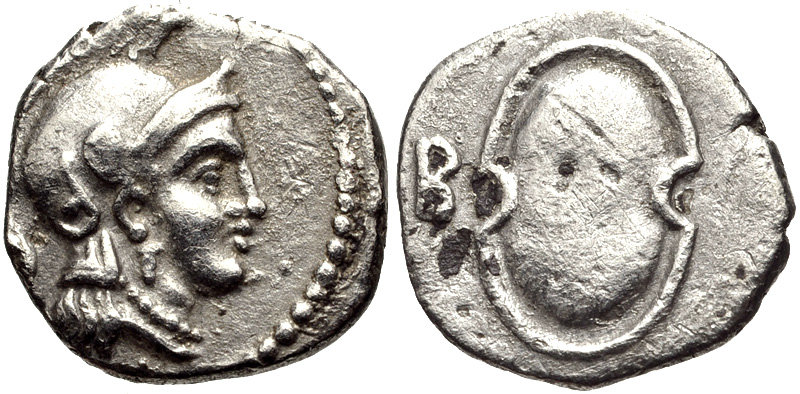
Coin of Balacrus, somatophylax of Alexander the Great, as satrap of Cilicia, with letter "B" next to the shield, standing for B[AΛAKPOI]. Tarsos. 333–323 BC.

Somatophylakes (Greek: Σωματοφύλακες; singular: somatophylax, σωματοφύλαξ) were the bodyguards of high-ranking people in ancient Greece.

The most famous body of somatophylakes were those of Philip II of Macedon and Alexander the Great. They consisted of seven men, drawn from the Macedonian nobility, who also acted as high-ranking military officers, holding command positions such as general or chiliarch. Alexander the Great appointed Peucestas as eighth somatophylax after the siege of Malli.

== Under Alexander the Great ==
Note that this list is speculative in several cases and would be disputed by scholars. For example, Hephaestion was probably not named as early as given below. The only complete list of Alexander's bodyguard in the original sources is found in Arrian (6.28.4), upon the extraordinary appointment of Peucestas in Carmania.

336–334

- Aristonous, Lysimachus, Peithon, Arybbas, Balacrus, Demetrius, Ptolemy*.

333

- Aristonous, Lysimachus, Peithon, Arybbas, Balacrus, Demetrius, Hephaestion.

332

- Aristonous, Lysimachus, Peithon, Arybbas, Menes, Demetrius, Hephaestion.

331

- Aristonous, Lysimachus, Peithon, Leonnatus, Menes, Demetrius, Hephaestion.

330–327

- Aristonous, Lysimachus, Peithon, Leonnatus, Perdiccas, Ptolemy of Lagus, Hephaestion.

326–324

- Aristonous, Lysimachus, Peithon, Leonnatus, Perdiccas, Ptolemy of Lagus, Hephaestion, Peucestas.

323

- Aristonous, Lysimachus, Peithon, Leonnatus, Perdiccas, Ptolemy of Lagus, Peucestas.

== Royal agema ==
The term somatophylakes is also used to refer to a member of the Royal Hypaspists, the agema, who acted as the King's bodyguard in battle. The Royal Pages would expect to begin their military service in this unit: thus Pausanias, Philip II's assassin was a member of this corps, not one of the Seven Bodyguards.

W Heckel believes that the Ptolemy* given above for 336 BC was not one of the Seven but commander of this unit. He was killed at Halicarnassus in 334 BC and succeeded by Admetus. The latter was killed at Tyre in 332 BC and appears to have been succeeded by Hephaestion.

== See also ==
- Companion cavalry
