= Onisim of the Caves =

Onisim of the Caves (Ukrainian: Онисим затвірник Печерський) (fl. 12th–13th century) was a monk of Kyiv Pechersk Lavra, buried at the Near Caves.

He is regarded as a saint (преподобний, i.e., the Venerable), He is also commemorated together with other Venerable ones interred in Near Caves on October 11 (28 September of the Julian calendar, see ru:Собор преподобных отцов Киево-Печерских, в Ближних пещерах почивающих.
