= Demetrius (son of Althaemenes) =

Demetrius (Ancient Greek: Δημήτριος), son of Althaemenes was hipparch of one ile of Hetairoi in the battle of Gaugamela. Demetrius' last recorded command was in the Mallian campaign (325 BC).
