= Osbe =

Town in Ancient Greece

Osbe (Greek: Όσβη) was an ancient town in North Chalcidice, probably between Mygdonia, Mounts Cholomon, Cissus and Bottike. It was later incorporated in Thessalonica, (315 BC). Its only known citizen is Ἀνδρέας Ἄνδρωνος Ὀσβαῖος Andreas, Andronos Osbaios c. 400-350 BC who died in Beroea (tomb stele).
