= Adymus of Beroea =

Sculptor of the 1st century AD

Adymus, Adymos or Hadymos, Hadymus (Greek: Ἅδυμος) son of Evander (perhaps Evander of Beroea) was a sculptor of the 1st century AD. His only preserved sculpture has been found in Idomene (Paeonia).
