= Antipater of Thessalonica =

Greek poet and epigrammatist (c.10 BC-c.AD 38)

Antipater of Thessalonica (Ancient Greek: Ἀντίπατρος ὁ Θεσσαλονικεύς; c. 10 BC - c. AD 38) was a Greek epigrammatist of the Roman period.

== Biography ==
Antipater lived during the latter part of the reign of Augustus, and perhaps into the reign of Caligula. He enjoyed the patronage of Lucius Calpurnius Piso (consul in 15 BC and then proconsul of Macedonia for several years), to whom several of his poems are addressed. Piso appointed him governor of Thessalonica.

He is named as the author of 35 epigrams in the Greek Anthology, with another 96 being attributed only to "Antipater" but not specifying which Antipater is meant. Antipater is the most copious and perhaps the most interesting of the Augustan epigrammatists. There are many allusions in his work to contemporary history:

- One poem celebrates the foundation of Nicopolis by Octavian after the battle of Actium
- Another anticipates his victory over the Parthians in the expedition of 20 BC
- Another is addressed to Gaius Caesar, who died in AD 4.

Antipater is also known to have proposed an alternative canon of nine female poets to the list of Nine Lyric Poets.

== See also ==
- Apollodorus (runner), Antipater's epigram
- Greek Anthology

== Bibliography ==
- Select Epigrams from the Greek Anthology. Translated by J. W. Mackail (London: Longmans, Green, and Co., 1890)
- The Greek Anthology, I, II, III, IV, V (Loeb Classical Library). Translated by W. R. Paton (London: Heinemann, 1916)
- Smith, William, ed. (1880). "Antipater of Thessalonica". Dictionary of Greek and Roman Biography and Mythology. Vol. 1. London. p. 204.
