= Chrysogonus of Athens =

Athenian flute player

Chrysogonus (Χρυσόγονος) was a celebrated Athenian flute player, who dressed in a sacred robe pythike stole played to keep the rowers in time, when Alcibiades made his triumphal entry into the Piraeus on his return from banishment in 407 BC. From a conversation between the father of Chrysogonus and Stratonicus, reported by Athenaeus, it seems that Chrysogonus had a brother who was a dramatic poet. Chrysogonus himself was the author of a poem or drama entitled Politeia, which some attributed to Epicharmus.
