= Demetrius (somatophylax) =

Demetrius (Ancient Greek: Δημήτριος) (died 330 BC) was one of Alexander's somatophylakes. He was suspected of being engaged in the conspiracy of Philotas, and was executed. Ptolemy I Soter replaced him as somatophylax.
