= Herophon =

Macedonian sculptor

Herophon (Greek: Ἡροφῶν, [hɛːropʰóːn]), son of Anaxagoras, was a Macedonian sculptor of the 2nd and 1st centuries BC. He is known from an inscription in Olympia, where he created a sculpture of Zeus for Eleans and other Greeks honouring Rome.

Herophon was also an envoy of Perseus of Macedon, sent to Eumenes II of Pergamon.
