= Symmoria =

The symmoria (Greek: συμμορία, pl. συμμορίαι, symmoriai) was a group of wealthy citizens in Classical Athens during the 4th century BC, assessed together for the purposes of taxation.

== Fiscal symmoriai ==
The symmoriai were first instituted in the archonship of Nausinikos (378/7 BC), when wealthy Athenian citizens, who were liable for the property tax known as eisphora, were grouped into such groups. The new measure was probably connected with the establishment of the Second Athenian League and the renewed conflict with Sparta that began in that year.

The number of the symmoriai is disputed, especially in view of the later establishment of the naval symmoriai, but 100 are mentioned by Kleidemos, and the number seems to correspond with other features of the Athenian fiscal system. It is generally assumed that the symmoriai formed units of approximately equal fiscal value, so that they paid equal tax. Due to the inevitable delays in collecting taxes from so many people, shortly after 360s BC, the proeisphora was introduced, whereby the three richest members–the hegemon (ἠγεμῶν, "leader") or protos (πρῶτος, "first"), after whom each symmoria was named, and the deuteros (δεύτερος, "second") and tritos (τρίτος, "third")—of each symmoria paid in advance the sum due from the rest. Each symmoria had a diagrapheus (διαγραφεύς), responsible for keeping and updating the group's register (diagramma, διάγραμμα). They were answerable to the city's ten strategoi, who were ultimately responsible for the symmoriai.

The metics were grouped into symmoriai of their own (metikoikai symmoriai, μετικοικαὶ συμμορίαι). Each was headed by a treasurer (tamias, ταμίας), and the tax officials, likewise drawn from the metics, were termed epigrapheis (ἐπιγραφεῖς).

== Naval symmoriai ==
Among the heaviest financial burdens borne by the wealthy classes of Athens was the trierarchy, i.e. the obligation (liturgy) of wealthy Athenians to equip (and command) a trireme for one year. Already from the last years of the 5th century, in an effort to alleviate it, the syntrierarchy (co-trierachy), in which the obligation was shared by two citizens, had been introduced. By the middle of the 4th century, however, the trierarchic system had become dysfunctional, not least due to the growing unwillingness of the wealthy classes to contribute time and money to the task. As a result, in 358/7 or 357/6 BC, a citizen called Periandros extended the system of the symmories to the trierarchy: a list of the 1,200 richest citizens (the synteleis, "joint contributors"), who were liable for the trierarchy, were grouped into twenty symmoriai of sixty men each.

The orator Demosthenes, in his speech On the Symmories in 354, proposed to reform the system further, but this was not done until 340. He also proposed to extend the symmoriai to the liturgies of the great Panathenaea and Dionysia festivals as well.

In the 330s or 320s BC, one of the ten strategoi of Athens was given charge of the symmoriai system, and was termed strategos epi tas symmorias.

== Other uses ==
The term is also found in the later Hellenistic period in Teos and in the Roman period in Nysa as a term for a public or private corporation, or as the subdivision of a phyle (tribe).

== Sources ==
- Gabrielsen, Vincent (1994). Financing the Athenian Fleet: Public Taxation and Social Relations. Baltimore and London: Johns Hopkins University Press. ISBN 0801846927.
- Hale, John R. (2014). Lords of the Sea: The Epic Story of the Athenian Navy and the Birth of Democracy. Viking. ISBN 978-1-906142-78-0.
- Poland, Franz (1931). "Συμμορία". Realencyclopädie der Classischen Altertumswissenschaft. Vol. Band IVA, Halbband 7, Stoa–Symposion. col. 1161–1167.
- Rhodes, Peter J. "Symmoria". Brill's New Pauly. Brill Online.
- Welwei, Karl-Wilhelm. "Trierarchia". Brill's New Pauly. Brill Online.
