= Parmeniskos group =

Parmeniskos group is a conventional term distinguished by Virginia R. Grace (1956) to describe a type of pottery (amphorae) produced in Macedon during the 3rd century BC. The capital of Pella appears to be the center for this group's production. Amphorae of this type were spread over the northern Aegean, Corinth, Troy and the Black Sea.

The group included the following potters:

- Ameinonikos Ἀμεινόνικος
- Antidoros Ἀντίδωρος
- Apollonios Ἀπολλώνιος
- Aristophanes Ἀριστοφάνης
- Bion Βίων
- Demetrios Δημήτριος
- Demotimos Δημότιμος
- Dionysodoros Διονυσόδωρος
- Euboulos Εὔβουλος
- Eugeiton Εὐγείτων
- Eukles Εὐκλῆς
- Euphron Εὔφρων
- Glaukos Γλαῦκος
- Hegesinos Ἡγησίνος
- Hippostratos Ἱππόστρατος
- Kallimachos Καλλίμαχος
- Kephisodoros Κηφισόδωρος
- Kritolaos Κριτόλαος
- Lysiponos Λυσίπονος
- Mikion Μικίων
- Nikios Νίκιος
- Nikostratos Νικόστρατος
- Pamphilos Πάμφιλος
- Paramonos Παράμονος
- Parmeniskos Παρμενίσκος
- Phanolaos Φανόλαος
- Poseidippos Ποσείδιππος
- Rhoimisos Ῥοίμισος
- Sopatros Σώπατρος
- Sokrates Σωκράτης
- Theodotos Θεόδοτος
- Timainetos Τιμαίνετος
