= Timander =

Timander is a surname. Notable people with the surname include:

- Timander (soldier) (fl. 4th century BC), officer of Alexander the Great
- Alice Timander (1915–2007), Swedish dentist and actress
- Mattias Timander (born 1974), Swedish ice hockey player
