= Onesimus (son of Python) =

Onesimus, son of Python, was a Macedonian noble and councillor of King Perseus. Once Onesimus had failed to dissuade Perseus from going to war, he began to excuse himself, for one reason or another, from being involved in activities. He finally passed over to the Romans, when Perseus resolved to declare war against the latter, 169 BC, and received in consequence magnificent rewards from the Roman Senate.

== See also ==
- History of Macedonia (ancient kingdom)
