= Soteria (festival) =

Religious festivals in ancient Greece

The Soteria (Greek: Σωτηρία) were ancient festivals held in many Greek cities from the 3rd century BC. They honoured the saviour (Soter) of a danger and could be dedicated to all the gods or only one (mainly Zeus Soterios). Heroic men regarded as deliverers were sometimes associated to the divinities, e.g. Aratus at Sicyon.

The most famous Soteria in antiquity were those held at Delphi. They had been instituted to commemorate the victory over the Celt invader Brennus (279 BC). They were composed of sports and musical competitions. Many cities were invited to the Delphi’s Soteria. In 246 BC, the Aetolian confederacy reorganized the festivities in order to equal others ancient games (e.g. the Pythian games).

== Sources ==
- The Oxford Classical Dictionary edited by S.Hornblower, A.Spawforth (1996). ISBN 978-0-19-866172-6.
