= Cleander of Macedon =

Officer of Alexander the Great

Cleander (Greek: Κλέανδρος), son of Polemocrates and brother of Coenus was one of Alexander the Great's officers. Cleander replaced Menander as commander of the mercenaries. Towards the winter of 334 BC, Alexander, being then in Caria, sent him to the Peloponnesos to collect mercenaries, and with these he returned and joined the king while he was engaged in the siege of Tyre, 332 BC. In 330, he was employed by Polydamas, Alexander's emissary, to kill Parmenion, under whom he had been left as second in command at Ecbatana. On Alexander's arrival in Carmania, 325 BC, Cleander joined him there, together with some other generals from Media and their forces. But he was accused with the rest of extreme profligacy and oppression, not unmixed with sacrilege, in his command, and was put to death by order of Alexander.
