= Onomastus of Macedon =

Antigonid general confidential officer of Philip V of Macedon

Onomastus (Ancient Greek: Ὀνόμαστος) was a confidential officer of Philip V of Macedon, for whom he held the government of the sea-coast of Thrace. Together with the general Cassander, Onomastus carried out the Massacre of Maroneia in 185 BC. Appius Claudius, and the other Roman commissioners, required that Philip should send Onomastus and Cassander to Rome to be examined about the massacre; whereupon the king despatched Cassander, and had him poisoned on the way, but persisted in declaring that Onomastus had not been in or near Maroneia at the time; the fact being (as Polybius and Livy tell us) that he was too deep in the royal secrets to be trusted at Rome. We hear again of Onomastus as one of the two assessors of Philip at the private trial of Demetrius, for the alleged attempt on the life of his brother Perseus, 182 BC.

== See also ==
- History of Macedonia (ancient kingdom)
