= Polydamas of Macedon =

Polydamas (Ancient Greek: Πολυδάμας, gen. Πολυδάμαντος, Polydámas, Polydámantos) was a hetairos of Macedonian or Thessalian origin. He was in Parmenion's guard, in the Pharsalian squadron. He was later sent by Alexander to Cleander with the command that Parmenion be put to death and was nearly lynched by Parmenion's troops after the order was carried out.
