= Parmenion (architect) =

Parmenion was an architect, who was employed by Alexander the Great in the building of Alexandria. He was entrusted with the superintendence of the works of sculpture, especially in the temple of Serapis (Serapeum), which came to be called by his name Parmenionis. Clement of Alexandria, however, ascribes the great statue of Serapis to Bryaxis. He is also mentioned by Vitruvius.
