= Erigyius =

Erigyius (in Greek Ἐριγυιoς; died 328 BC), a Mytilenaean, son of Larichus, was an officer in Alexander the Great's army. He had been driven into banishment by Philip II, king of Macedon, because of his faithful attachment to Alexander, and returned when the latter came to the throne in 336 BC. At the battle of Gaugamela, 331 BC, he commanded the cavalry of the allies, as he did also when Alexander set out in 330 BC from Ecbatana in pursuit of Darius III. In the same year Erigyius was entrusted with the command of one of the three divisions with which Alexander invaded Hyrcania. He was also among the generals sent against Satibarzanes, whom he slew in battle with his own hand. In 329 BC, together with Craterus and Hephaestion, and with the assistance of Aristander, a soothsayer, he endeavoured to dissuade Alexander from crossing the Jaxartes river against the Scythians. In 328 BC he fell in a battle against the Bactrian fugitives.
