= Phrourarch =

Garrison commander in the Greek military

Phrourarch or Phrourarchos (Ancient Greek: φρούραρχος) is a Greek military title, meaning garrison commander. Athenians controlled their overseas empire with the episcopi and phrourarchs. The term was widely used by the Macedonian and later Hellenistic armies. Regarding the Spartans, it is not clear if phrourarch was the specific Spartan term. Phroura (garrison) is reported to be a Spartan term for 'a small mobile or expeditionary force'. The title for the governor of the garrisoned cities under the Spartan hegemony was harmost.
