= Meleager (general) =

4th-century BC Macedonian general

Meleager (Greek: Mελέαγρος, Meléagros; died 323 BC) was a Macedonian officer who served under Alexander the Great. He was an infantry commander that was among the officers that accompanied the king in his quest to conquer Asia Minor, and was one of the most experienced among them. The only military figure who was more experienced than Meleager was the Macedonian general Antipater, who remained in Macedon during Alexander's entire Asian campaign.

== Career ==
Meleager, son of Neoptolemus, is first mentioned in the war against the Getae in 335 BC. At the Battle of the Granicus in the following year, he commanded one of the divisions of the phalanx, a post which he continued to hold throughout Alexander's campaigns in Asia. He was appointed, together with Coenus and Ptolemy, the son of Seleucus, to command the newly married troops who were sent home from Caria to spend the winter in Macedon, and rejoined Alexander at Gordium during the following summer.

Meleager was present at the Battles of Issus and Gaugamela against the Persian Army under King Darius III, and was associated with Craterus in the task of dislodging the enemy who guarded the passes into Persia. He took part in the passage of the Hydaspes and in various other operations in India.

Despite a long series of services, Alexander did not promote Meleager to any higher position, nor did Meleager take part in any separate command of importance. There are accounts that suggest that the two did not get along or at least had a history of disagreements. For instance, when Alexander gave gifts to the Indian prince Taxiles, Meleager was recorded to have quipped bitterly that it was a pity for the king to travel all the way to India only to give a man such lavish rewards, with Alexander retorting that envious men only hurt themselves.

== Politics and death ==
After the death of Alexander in 323 BC, Meleager was the first to propose in the council of officers, that either Arrhidaeus or Heracles, the son of Barsine, should at once be chosen as king, rather than waiting to see if the pregnant Roxana would bear a son. There are sources who suggest that this proposal was motivated by a desire to install a king who was a Macedonian instead of one who had Persian roots or Persian sympathies. The Roman historian Justin, for instance, stated that Meleager was quoted saying: "It was unlawful that kings should be chosen for the Macedonians from the blood of those kingdoms they had overthrown." The Roman historian, Curtius, states that Meleager broke out into violent invectives against the ambition of Perdiccas and then abruptly quit the assembly in order to encourage the soldiery to express their opposition against Perdiccas. The Greek historian, Diodorus, states that Meleager was sent by the assembled generals to appease the clamours and discontent of the troops, but instead of doing so, he joined the mutineers.

Meleager assumed the leadership of the opposition to Perdiccas and his party and placed himself at the head of the infantry, who had declared themselves (possibly at his instigation) in favour of the claims of Arrhidaeus to the vacant throne. Meleager ordered the execution of Perdiccas, but the implementation of this instruction was nullified by the boldness of the regent. The greater part of the cavalry, together with almost all the generals, sided with Perdiccas, and leaving Babylon, established themselves in a separate camp outside the walls of the city. A reconciliation between both sides was achieved, principally thanks to the intervention of Eumenes, and it was agreed that the royal authority should be divided between Arrhidaeus and the expected son of Roxana and that, in the meantime, Meleager should be associated with Perdiccas in the regency.

It was impossible that Meleager and Perdiccas could long continue on friendly terms, and Meleager proved no match for Perdiccas. Perdiccas contrived to lull his rival into a false sense of security, while he made himself master of Philip Arrhidaeus. Then he struck the first blow. The whole army was assembled under the pretence of a general review. Then the king, at the instigation of Perdiccas, suddenly demanded the surrender and punishment of all the leaders of the recent disorders. The infantry were taken by surprise, with 300 of the alleged mutineers being singled out and executed. Although Meleager was not personally attacked, he fled and took refuge in a temple, where he was pursued and put to death on the orders of Perdiccas.
