= Evander of Beroea =

Evander (Greek: Εὔανδρος) son of Evander from Beroea was a Roman-era Macedonian sculptor of the 1st century AD. A well-preserved relief of the Flavian period, was signed by him. Two other signatures of Evander are also found in Lete and Larissa.
