= Antigonos (son of Callas) =

Ancient Macedonian general

Antigonos of Callas (Ancient Greek: Ἀντίγονος Κάλλα) was an ancient Macedonian hetairos from Amphipolis, known through an inscription with a Homeric-style epigram of about 300-275 BC, where he commemorates his win in Hoplitodromos (a race in full armour) at Heraclean games after the Conquest of Tyre in 332 BC. Alexander had dreamt that Heracles invited him into Tyre. Aristander the seer interpreted this to mean that the city will be captured, but with Herculean effort. Afterwards, Alexander offered sacrifice to Heracles, and celebrated both a gymnastic and musical contest there (Arrian 3,6,1).

When Alexander threw down with spear the Tyrian island

he honoured Herakles with games and prizes.

Antigonos son of Kallas, there, first of hetairoi,

was crowned with double garlands in hoplite race

henika Alexandros Tyrian dori neson ereipsas

Heraklea timais euxen aethlophorois

Antigonos Kalla dissous tothi, protos hetairon

hoplitou stadiou t' amphetheto stephanous
