= Amyntas (son of Andromenes) =

4th-century BC Macedonian general

Amyntas (Greek: Ἀμύντας; died 330 BC) was a Macedonian officer in Alexander the Great's army, son of Andromenes from Tymphaia. After the Battle of the Granicus, 334 BC, when the garrison of Sardis was quietly surrendered to Alexander, Amyntas was the officer sent forward to receive it from the commander, Mithrenes. Two years after, 332, we again hear of him as being sent into Macedonia to collect levies, while Alexander after the siege of Gaza advanced to Egypt; and he returned with them in the ensuing year, when the king was in possession of Susa.

After the execution of Philotas on a charge of treason in 330 Amyntas and two other sons of Andromenes (Attalus and Simmias) were arrested on suspicion of having been engaged in the plot. The suspicion was strengthened by their known intimacy with Philotas, and by the fact that their brother Polemon had fled from the camp when the latter was apprehended, or according to Curtius, when he was given up to the torture. Amyntas defended himself and his brothers ably, and their innocence being further established by Polemon's reappearance, they were acquitted. Some little time after, Amyntas was killed by an arrow at the siege of a village. It is doubtful whether the son of Andromenes is the Amyntas mentioned by Curtius as commander of a portion of the Macedonian troops at the Battle of Issus in 333; or again, the person spoken of as leading a brigade at the forcing of the Cilician Gates in 331. But Amyntas was a common name among the Macedonians.
