= Simmias of Macedon =

Simmias (Ancient Greek: Σιμμίας) was a Macedonian officer, son of Andromenes from Tymphaia and brother of Attalus and Amyntas, the officers of Alexander the Great. He probably served in the division of the phalanx, commanded by his brother Amyntas, as we find him taking the command of it at the battle of Gaugamela during his brother's absence. On this occasion his division was one of those which bore the chief brunt of the battle. In 330 BC, he was accused, together with his brothers, of having been concerned in the conspiracy of Philotas; but the vigorous defence of Amyntas before the Macedonian army procured their joint acquittal.
