= Coenus (general) =

4th-century BC Macedonian officer

Coenus (Greek: Koῖνος; died 326 BC), a son of Polemocrates and son-in-law of Parmenion, was one of the ablest and most faithful of Alexander the Great's generals during his eastern expedition.

== General of Alexander ==
In the autumn of 334 BC, while Alexander was in Caria, he sent those of his soldiers who had been recently married in Macedonia to spend the ensuing winter with their wives. Coenus was one of the commanders who led them back to Europe.

In the spring of the following year (333 BC), Coenus returned with the Macedonians and joined Alexander at Gordium.

After the conquest of Drangiana, in the latter part of 330 BC, Coenus joined others in accusing his wife's brother, Philotas, of treason for conspiring against Alexander. This led to the execution of Philotas, and the assassination of Coenus' father-in-law, Parmenion.

Coenus commanded a taxeis (unit of 1500 Phalangites) of Alexander's army, and distinguished himself on various occasions. In all of Alexander's major battles, Coenus commanded the right-most battalion of infantry in the massive Macedonian phalanx. In the Macedonian battle tradition, the most favoured soldiers were positioned on the right. In this regard, Coenus's distinction as commander of the "best" infantry of the phalanx indicates he was tactically reliable, probably extremely intelligent in warfare, and brave in battle; he was probably the epitome of the highly respected "lead-by-example" Macedonian general.

== Death ==
When Alexander had arrived at the river Hyphasis, he was anxious to push his conquests still further. Coenus was the first of his commanders who had the boldness to urge the necessity of returning home, and the king was obliged to follow his advice.

Arrian states that a short time afterwards, when the Macedonian army had actually commenced its return, Coenus died of an illness (326 BC), and was honoured by the king with a splendid burial. Alexander lamented his death, but is reported to have said that Coenus had urged the necessity of returning so strongly, as if he alone had been destined to see his native country again.
