= Attalus (son of Andromenes) =

4th-century BC Macedonian general

Attalus (Greek: Ἄτταλος; fl. 4th century BC), son of Andromenes from Tymphaia, and one of Alexander's officers, was accused with his brothers, Amyntas and Simmias, of having been engaged in the conspiracy of Philotas in 330 BC, but was acquitted, together with his brothers. In 328, Attalus was left with Polyperchon and other officers in Bactria with part of the troops, while the king himself marched against the Sogdians. He accompanied Alexander in his expedition into India, and was employed in several important duties. During Alexander's last illness in 323, Attalus was one of the seven chief officers who passed the night in the temple of Serapis at Babylon, in order to learn from the god whether Alexander should be carried into the temple.

After the death of Alexander, Attalus joined Perdiccas, whose sister, Atalantê, he had married. He accompanied his brother-in-law in his unfortunate campaign against Egypt in 321, and had the command of the fleet. After the murder of Perdiccas, all his friends were condemned to death by the army; Atalantê, who was in the camp, was executed immediately, but Attalus escaped his wife's fate in consequence of his absence with the fleet at Pelusium. He forthwith sailed to Tyre (Lebanon), where the treasures of Perdiccas had been deposited. These, which amounted to as much as 800 talents, were surrendered to him by Archelaus, who had been appointed governor of the town, and by means of these he soon found himself at the head of 10,000 foot and 800 horse. He remained at Tyre for some time, to collect the friends of Perdiccas who had escaped from the army; but then, instead of uniting his forces immediately with those of Alcetas, the brother of Perdiccas, he sailed to the coast of Caria, where he became involved in a contest with the Rhodians, by whom he was completely defeated in a sea-fight. After this, he joined Alcetas; but their united forces were defeated in Pisidia by Antigonus, who had the conduct of the war against the party of Perdiccas. Alcetas escaped for a time, but Attalus with many others was taken prisoner. This happened in 320 BC; and he and his companions remained in captivity until 317 BC, when they contrived on one occasion to overpower their guards, and obtain possession of the castle in which they were confined. Before they could effect their escape, the castle was surrounded with troops from the neighbourhood. They continued, however, to defend it for a year and four months; but at length were obliged to yield to superior numbers. We do not hear of Attalus after this: his daughters were with Olympias in 317.
