= Trierarch =

Ancient Greek trireme commander

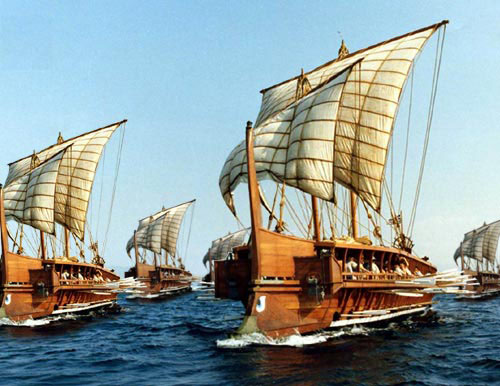
Picture of Greek ship

Trierarch (Greek: τριήραρχος, romanized: triērarchos) was the title of officers who commanded a trireme (triēres) in the classical Greek world.

In Classical Athens, the title was associated with the trierarchy (τριηραρχία, triērarchia), one of the public offices or liturgies, which were filled by wealthy citizens for a year. As the name implies, the trierarch was responsible for the outfitting and crewing of a trireme, and for commanding it in battle. Trierarchs thus had to be men of considerable means, since the expenses incurred could run as high as a talent in the course of a year. As the cost of the office was great, co-trierarchs (syntriērarchoi) were also appointed. By the 4th century BC, trierarchies in Athens were assumed by navy boards (symmoriai), as the financial burden of the job had become too great.
