= Amyntor =

Amyntor (Ancient Greek: Ἀμύντωρ, romanized: Amýntor, lit. 'defender') may refer to:

- In Greek mythology:

- Amyntor (son of Ormenus), a mythological king, who was the father of Phoenix, the tutor and companion of Achilles.
- Amyntor (son of Aegyptus), killed by his wife Damone, one of the Danaïdes.
- Amyntor (son of Phrastor), father of Teutamides and grandfather of Nanas.

- People:

- Amyntor (Macedonian), a 4th-century Macedonian aristocrat and the father of Hephaestion, the general and companion of Alexander the Great
- Gerhard von Amyntor, the pen name of the 19th-century German poet Dagobert von Gerhardt

- In biology

- Ceratomia amyntor, the elm sphinx or four-horned sphinx, a North American moth in the family Sphingidae.
- Cyanophrys amyntor, or the Amyntor greenstreak, a butterfly in the family Lycaenidae
- Papilio amyntor, a synonym for the butterfly species Artipe eryx

- In the arts:

- Amyntor, or a Defence of Milton's Life, a 1699 book by the Irish rationalist philosopher John Toland
- Amyntor and Theodora a 1747 play by the Scottish dramatist David Mallet
- "Amyntor", a 1795 song by the English composer Raynor Taylor
- Amyntor, a character in the 1948 historical novel The King Must Die, by Mary Renault, about the ancient Greek hero Theseus.
