= Hephaestion =

Macedonian nobleman and general (c. 356–324 BC)

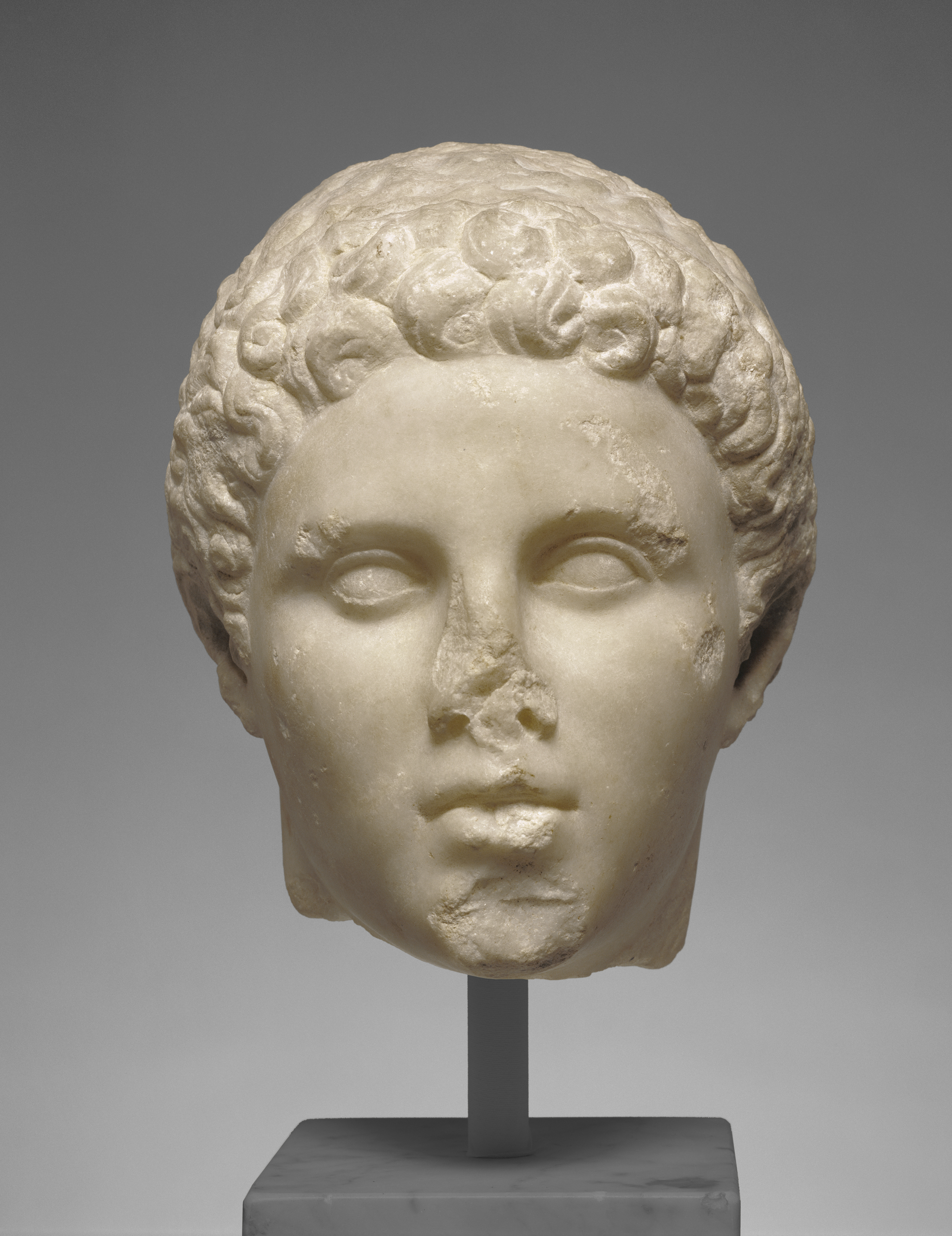
- Hephaestion marble head, as of September 2015 housed in the Getty Museum in Los Angeles, California
- Born: c. 356 BC; Pella, Macedonia, Ancient Greece
- Died: Autumn 324 BC (aged c. 32); Ecbatana
- Spouse: Drypetis (princess of the Achaemenid dynasty in Persia)
- Military career
- Allegiance: Macedonia
- Rank: General, 2nd in command.
- Unit: Somatophylakes
- Commands: Companion cavalry
- Conflicts: Siege of Pelium; Battle of Thebes; Battle of the Granicus; Siege of Halicarnassus; Siege of Miletus; Battle of Issus; Siege of Tyre (332 BC); Siege of Gaza; Battle of Gaugamela; Battle of the Persian Gate; Siege of Aornos; Battle of the Hydaspes River; Mallian Campaign

Hephaestion (Ancient Greek: Ἡφαιστίων Hēphaistíōn; c. 356 BC – 324 BC), son of Amyntor, was an ancient Macedonian nobleman of probable "Attic or Ionian extraction" and a general in the army of Alexander the Great. He was "by far the dearest of all the king's friends; he had been brought up with Alexander and shared all his secrets." This relationship – indicated by some ancient writers to have been sexual – lasted throughout their lives, and was compared, by others as well as themselves, to that of Achilles and Patroclus.

His military career was distinguished. A member of Alexander the Great's personal bodyguard, he went on to command the Companion cavalry and was entrusted with many other tasks throughout Alexander's ten-year campaign in Asia, including diplomatic missions, the bridging of major rivers, sieges and the foundation of new settlements. Besides being a soldier, engineer and diplomat, he corresponded with the philosophers Aristotle and Xenocrates and actively supported Alexander in his attempts to integrate the Greeks and Persians. Alexander formally made him his second-in-command when he appointed him Chiliarch of the empire. Alexander also made him part of the royal family when he gave him as his bride Drypetis, sister to his own second wife Stateira, both daughters of Darius III of Persia.

When Hephaestion died suddenly at Ecbatana around age thirty-two, Alexander was overwhelmed with grief. He petitioned the oracle at Siwa to grant Hephaestion divine status and thus Hephaestion was honoured as a Divine Hero. Hephaestion was cremated and his ashes taken to Babylon. At the time of his own death a mere eight months later, Alexander was still planning lasting monuments to Hephaestion's memory.

== Youth and education ==
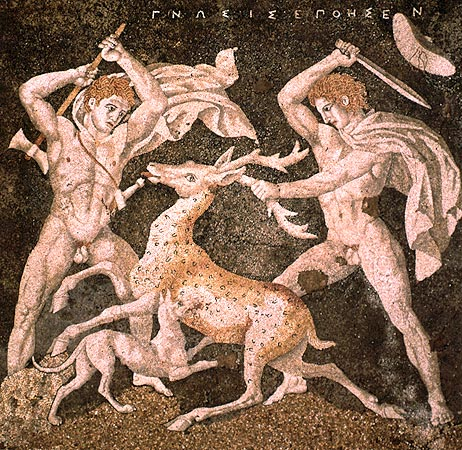
The emblema of the Stag Hunt Mosaic, c. 300 BC, from Pella; the figure on the right is possibly Alexander the Great due to the date of the mosaic, along with the depicted upsweep of his centrally-parted hair (anastole); the figure on the left wielding a double-edged axe (associated with Hephaistos) is perhaps Hephaestion.

Hephaestion's exact age is not known. No concise biography has ever been written about him, likely stemming from the fact that he died before Alexander and none of those among Alexander's companions who survived him would have had a need to promote someone other than themselves. Many scholars cite Hephaestion's age as being similar to Alexander's so it is fair to assume that he was born about 356 BC. He is said to have become a page in 343 BC, a role common to adolescent boys of the aristocratic class in Macedon. As a member of the court, he may have met Alexander around this time.

The only surviving anecdote from Hephaestion's youth comes courtesy of the Alexander Romance. According to this tale, "one day when Alexander was 15 years old ... sailing with Hephaestion, his friend, he easily reached Pisa ... and he went off to stroll with Hephaestion." That Alexander's exact age is given provides another clue to Hephaestion's upbringing because at fifteen Alexander and his companions were at Mieza studying under Aristotle. Hephaestion has never been named among those who attended the lectures at Mieza, but his close friendship with Alexander at that age suggests strongly that he was numbered among them. More telling is Hephaestion's name being found in a catalogue of Aristotle's correspondences. The letters themselves have been lost, but for them to have found their way into an official catalogue, their content must have been of some significance. It implies that Hephaestion received a good education and shows that Aristotle was impressed enough by his alleged pupil to send letters throughout Alexander's expanding empire to converse with him.

A few years after the lectures at Mieza, Hephaestion's presence was notably absent when several of Alexander's close friends were exiled as a result of the Pixodarus affair. Among those exiled by Philip II after Alexander's failed attempt to offer himself as groom to the Carian princess were Ptolemy, Nearchus, Harpalus, Erigyius and Laomedon. The reason for Hephaestion's absence from this list could be the fact that all of the exiled men were older friends of Alexander, Erigyius himself roughly 24 years older than the prince. Hephaestion was a contemporary of Alexander and it is likely that his influence might have been seen as less of a threat than these more mature companions. Whatever Hephaestion's opinion had been on the whole affair, like many of Alexander's other childhood companions he was not exiled in its aftermath.

== Career ==
Sharing Alexander's upbringing, Hephaestion would have learned to fight and to ride well from an early age. His first taste of military action was probably the campaign against the Thracians while Alexander was regent, followed by Philip II's Danube campaign (342 BC) and the battle of Chaeronea (338 BC) while he was still in his teens. His name is not mentioned in lists of high-ranking officers during the early battles of Alexander's Danube campaign (335 BC) or the invasion of Persia. Nor are the names of Alexander's other close friends and contemporaries listed, suggesting that their promotions, when they achieved them, were earned by merit.

=== Wars in Persia ===
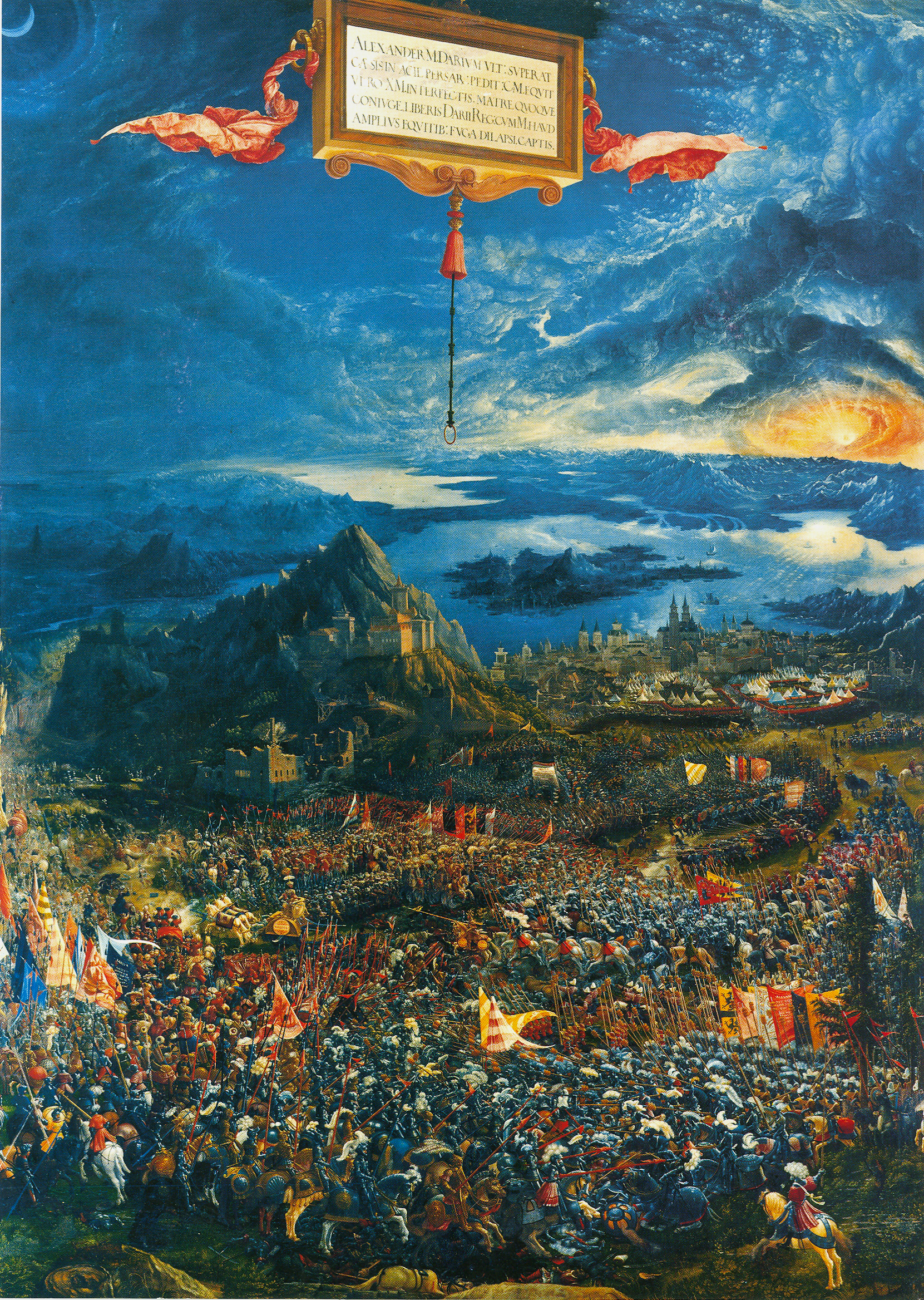
The Battle of Issus by Albrecht Altdorfer, 1529

Hephaestion's career was never solely a military one. Right from the start he was also engaged in special missions, sometimes diplomatic, sometimes technical. The first mention of his career in the sources is a diplomatic mission of some importance. After the battle of Issus (333 BC) when Alexander was proceeding south down the Phoenician coast and had received the capitulation of Sidon, Hephaestion was "authorised to appoint to the throne the Sidonian he considered most deserving of that high office". Hephaestion took local advice and chose a man distantly related to the royal family, but whose honesty had reduced him to working as a gardener. The man, Abdalonymus, had a successful royal career, fully justifying Hephaestion's choice.

After the siege of Tyre (332 BC) Alexander entrusted his fleet to Hephaestion, who had orders to skirt the coast and head for Gaza, their next objective, while Alexander himself led the army overland. Hephaestion's task was not an easy one, for this was not the Athenian fleet with which Alexander had started and had earlier disbanded, but a motley collection of semi-reluctant allies of many nationalities who would need holding together with patience and strength. Furthermore, on arrival at Gaza the cargo of siege engines had to be unloaded, transported across difficult terrain and reassembled.

Plutarch, while writing about Alexander's correspondence, reveals an occasion when Hephaestion was away on business and Alexander wrote to him. The subject matter suggests that this took place while they were in Egypt. What business Hephaestion was attending to we do not know, but Andrew Chugg has suggested that it was concerned either with his command of the fleet or Athenian diplomacy. He quotes sources which suggest that Hephaestion had been approached by Aristion of Athens to effect a reconciliation between Alexander and Demosthenes and, certainly, Athens' inaction during the revolt of the Spartan king Agis would seem to support this idea. As Chugg says, "If he did persuade Alexander to reach an accommodation with Demosthenes at this critical juncture, as would seem likely from the circumstances, then he was significantly responsible for saving the situation for Macedon in Greece by preventing the revolt of Agis spreading to Athens and her allies."

It is likely, though not certain, that it was Hephaestion who led the advance army from Egypt to bridge the Euphrates river. Darius of Persia sent Mazaeus to hold the opposite bank while the bridging work was in progress. This Mazaeus was the commander who threw away what looked like certain victory on the Persian right at the battle of Gaugamela (331 BC) and later became Alexander's governor of Babylon. Robin Lane Fox has suggested that a conversation with Hephaestion may have won Mazaeus over: "It is conceivable that the battle of Gaugamela was partly won on the banks of the Euphrates and that Mazaeus' reinstatement was less a sign of magnanimity than of a prearranged reward."

It is at Gaugamela that mention is first made of Hephaestion's rank. He is called the "commander of the bodyguards (somatophylakes)". This is not the Royal Squadron, whose duties also included guarding the king in battle and which was at that time commanded by Cleitus—a man of the older generation—but a small group of close companions specifically designated to fight alongside the king. Hephaestion was certainly in the thick of things with Alexander, for Arrian tells us he was wounded and Curtius specifically mentions that it was a spear wound in the arm.

After Gaugamela there is the first indication that Alexander intended reconciliation with the Persians and that Hephaestion supported him in this unpopular policy. One evening in Babylon Alexander noticed a high-born woman obliged to dance as part of the entertainment. Curtius explains: "The following day, he (Alexander) instructed Hephaestion to have all the prisoners brought to the royal quarters and there he verified the lineage of each of them." Alexander had realized that people from noble families were being treated with little dignity and wanted to do something about it. That he chose Hephaestion to help him shows that he could rely on Hephaestion's tact and sympathy. Yet Alexander could also rely on Hephaestion for firmness and resolve. When his policies had led to a plot against his life, the possible involvement of a senior officer, Philotas, caused much concern. It was Hephaestion, along with Craterus and Coenus, who insisted on, and actually carried out, the customary torture.

After the execution of Philotas (330 BC), Hephaestion was appointed joint commander—with Cleitus—of the Companion cavalry, Philotas' former position. This dual appointment was a way of satisfying two divergent shades of opinion now hardening throughout the army: one, like Hephaestion, broadly supportive of Alexander's policy of integration, and the other, that of Philip's older veterans in particular, whose implacable resentment of Persian ways was well represented by Cleitus. The cavalry prospered under this command, showing itself equal to learning new tactics necessary against Scythian nomads and to counter-insurgency measures such as those deployed in the spring of 328 BC. The army set out from Balkh in five columns to spread through the valleys between the Oxus and Tanais rivers to pacify Sogdiana. Hephaestion commanded one of the columns and, after arriving at Marakanda, he set out again to establish settlements in the region.

=== Expedition into India ===
In spring 327 BC the army headed into India and Alexander divided his forces. He led his section north into the Swat Valley, while Hephaestion and Perdiccas took a sizeable contingent through the Khyber Pass. Hephaestion's orders were to "take over either by force or agreement all places on their march and upon reaching the Indus to make suitable preparations for crossing". They were in unknown territory, whose political and geographical landscapes were unfamiliar, and Hephaestion would have had to make decisions on the spot and act accordingly. He reached the Indus with the land behind him conquered, including the successful siege of Peuceolatis, which took thirty days, and proceeded to organize the construction of boats for the crossing.

Alexander often had to divide his forces and command was given to a variety of senior officers on different occasions. For example, a few weeks before this mission of Hephaestion's, Craterus had been sent with a large force to subdue the last two remaining Bactrian rebels. It seems that Hephaestion was chosen when the objectives were far from clear-cut, and Alexander needed a commander on whom he could rely to do what he would have done himself without needing instructions.

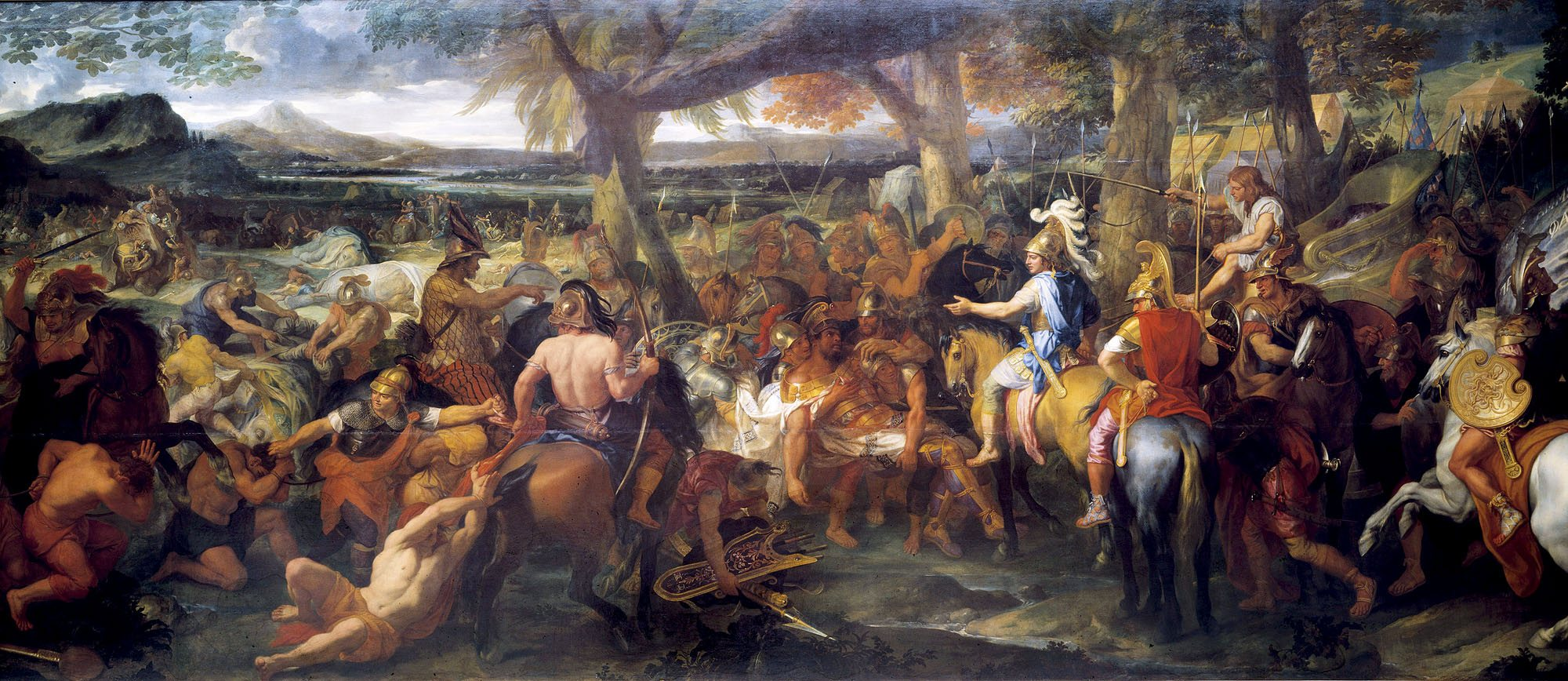
A painting by Charles Le Brun depicting Alexander and Hephaestion (in red cloak), facing Porus, during the Battle of the Hydaspes.

Hephaestion took part in a notable cavalry charge at the battle of the Hydaspes river (326 BC). Then when the army began its homeward journey he was again entrusted with half the army, including the elite troops and two hundred elephants, as they travelled south-west along the banks of the Hydaspes. Some of the army, including Alexander himself, travelled in boats which had been provided by the sponsorship of leading courtiers. Arrian lists Hephaestion first among these "honorary trierarchs", indicating his leading position at this time. On entering hostile territory Alexander split his forces into three. Hephaestion's section marched "five days in advance, with the object of intercepting and capturing any native troops which ... might be rapidly moving forward". Again, Hephaestion was called upon when initiative was required. After Alexander had taken a detour to subdue a hostile tribe, in which he was seriously injured, Hephaestion took command of the greater part of the army as they travelled down the Indus to the sea. At the coast he organized the construction of a fortress and a harbour for the fleet at Pattala.

Hephaestion was in command at Pattala while Alexander advanced. When he rejoined Alexander at Rhambacia he established a city there also. Hephaestion crossed the Gedrosian desert with Alexander, sharing the torments of that journey and, when the army was safely back in Susa, he was decorated for bravery. He was to take part in no further fighting; he had only months to live. But, having ended his military career as Alexander's de facto second-in-command, he was also his second in the political sphere. Alexander had made that official by naming him Chiliarch. Photius mentions Perdiccas being appointed "to command the chiliarchy which Hephaestion had originally held".

== Relationships ==
=== Alexander ===
Little is known of Hephaestion's personal relationships beyond his close friendship with Alexander. Alexander was an outgoing, charismatic man who had many friends but his dearest and closest friend and confidant was Hephaestion. Theirs was a friendship which had been forged in boyhood. It endured through adolescence, through Alexander's becoming king, and through the hardships of campaigning and the flatteries of court life and their marriages.

Their tutor Aristotle described friendship in general as "one soul abiding in two bodies". That they themselves considered their friendship to be of such a kind is shown by the stories of the morning after the Battle of Issus. Diodorus, Arrian and Curtius all describe the scene—perhaps a legend— when Alexander and Hephaestion went together to visit the captured Persian royal family. Its senior member, the queen Sisygambis, knelt to Hephaestion to plead for their lives, having mistaken him for Alexander because he was taller, and both young men were wearing similar clothes. When she realized her mistake she was acutely embarrassed, but Alexander pardoned her, saying "You were not mistaken, Mother; this man too is Alexander." Their affection for each other was no secret, as is borne out by their own words. Hephaestion, when replying to a letter to Alexander's mother, Olympias, said "you know that Alexander means more to us than anything". Arrian says that Alexander, after Hephaestion's death, described him as "the friend I valued as my own life". Paul Cartledge describes their closeness when he says: "Alexander seems actually to have referred to Hephaestion as his alter ego."

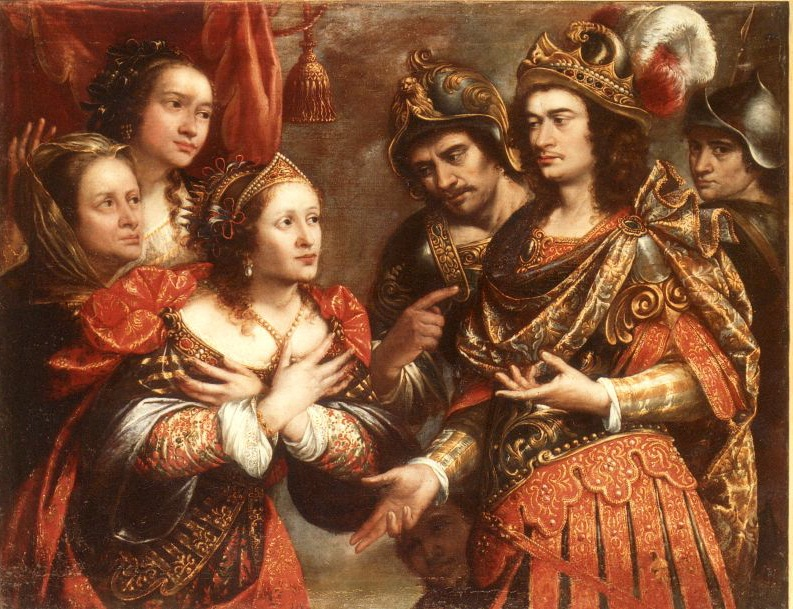
The family of Darius in front of Alexander, by Justus Sustermans and preserved in the Biblioteca Museu Víctor Balaguer. In this picture we can see Hephaestion point out Alexander.

Aside from their strong personal bond, theirs was also a working partnership in that all that Alexander undertook, Hephaestion was at his side. It is possible to discern a pattern, when studying Hephaestion's career, of Alexander's constant trust in, and increasing reliance on, Hephaestion. By the time of the advance into India, after the deaths of senior generals from the older generation, there had been worrying instances among senior officers of their own generation of treachery, a lack of sympathy with Alexander's aims of further integration of Persians into the army, and of sheer incompetence. Time after time, when Alexander needed to divide his forces he entrusted half to Hephaestion, knowing that in him he had a man of unquestionable loyalty who understood and sympathized with his aims and, above all, who got the job done.

Hephaestion played a full part in Alexander's regular consultations with senior officers, but he was the one to whom Alexander would also talk in private, sharing his thoughts, hopes, and plans. Curtius states that Hephaestion was the sharer of all his secrets; and Plutarch describes an occasion when Alexander had a controversial change to impose and implies that Hephaestion was the one with whom Alexander discussed it and who arranged for the change to be implemented. According to the painting done by Aetion of Alexander's first wedding, Hephaestion was his torch-bearer (best man), showing by this not only his friendship, but also his support for Alexander's policies as Alexander's choice of an Asian bride had not been a popular one among the Macedonians.

By the time they returned to Persia, Hephaestion was officially, by title, Alexander's second-in-command, as he had long been in practice, and also his brother-in-law (their wives were sisters). Hammond sums up their public relationship as follows: "It is not surprising that Alexander was as closely attached to Hephaestion as Achilles was to Patroclus", and "At the time of his death Hephaestion held the highest single command, that of the Companion Cavalry; and had been repeatedly second in command to Alexander in the hierarchy of the Asian court, holding the title of Chiliarch, which had been held by Nabarzanes under Darius. Thus Alexander honoured Hephaestion both as the closest of his friends and the most distinguished of his Field Marshals."

No other circumstance shows better the nature and length of their relationship than Alexander's overwhelming grief at Hephaestion's death. As Andrew Chugg says, "it is surely incredible that Alexander's reaction to Hephaestion's death could indicate anything other than the closest relationship imaginable". The many and varied ways, both spontaneous and planned, by which Alexander poured out his grief are detailed below. In the context of the nature of their relationship however, one stands out as remarkable. Arrian says that Alexander "flung himself on the body of his friend and lay there nearly all day long in tears, and refused to be parted from him until he was dragged away by force by his Companions".

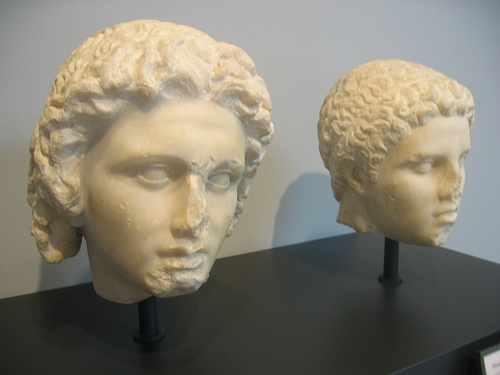
Alexander (left) and Hephaestion (right). Getty Villa, J. Paul Getty Museum.

==== Nature of relationship ====
It has been suggested by some modern scholars that, aside of having been close friends, Alexander and Hephaestion were also lovers, though hardly any "of Alexander's extant ancient Greek or Roman biographers ever refers to Hephaestion as anything but Alexander's friend", conforming with Hephaestion's epithet "Philalexandros" which was given to him by Alexander himself. However, the ancient Greek word "φίλος" (philos), besides meaning "friend", was also applied to lovers in the homo-erotic or sexual sense.

Arrian mentions in Discourses of Epictetus that Alexander reportedly ordered the temple of Asclepius to be burnt after his eromenos ("beloved" or subordinate lover) died; the latter is not named, but Arrian says in his other work Anabasis that Alexander was said to committ such act after the death of Hephaestion – therefore Daniel Ogden argues the anonymous male lover from Discourses should be identified as Hephaestion. Justin claims Hephaestion was "dear" to Alexander because of the former's "beauty (forma) and boyishness (pueritia), and because of the services (obsequia) he performed for him [Alexander]", which Ogden interpretes as implication of the commander's "sexual services" to the King. There also exists text among Cynic epistles, spuriously attributed to Diogenes of Sinope, that outwardly claims Alexander and Hephaestion were lovers by making the statement that Alexander was "controlled by Hephaestion's thighs", although it is uncertain how much historically accurate is this information, due to "spurious" and "late" nature of the source. Quintus Curtius Rufus also appears to imply that Hephaestion was Alexander's lover in context of comparison of the former's "beauty" to those of Alexander's eromenos Excipinos (character otherwise unattested). In similar fashion Diodorus Siculus seems to indirectly suggest lovers rivarly for Alexander's favour between Hephaestion and Craterus.

Lucian, writing in his book On Slips of the Tongue, describes an occasion when Hephaestion's conversation one morning implied that he had been in Alexander's tent all night. He also makes in Dialogues of the Dead ambiguous remark that Alexander loved Hephaestion "to excess (huperagapon)".

Plutarch describes the intimacy between them when he tells how Hephaestion was in the habit of reading Alexander's letters with him, and of a time when he showed that the contents of a letter were to be kept secret by touching his ring to Hephaestion's lips.

Furthermore, Arrian and Plutarch describe the occasion when Alexander and Hephaestion publicly identified themselves with the Homeric figures of Achilles and Patroclus, who were perceived as lovers by some post-homeric authors, like Aeschylus and Plato. At the onset of the campaign in Asia, Alexander led a contingent of the army to visit Troy, scene of the events in his beloved Iliad. He encircled the tomb of Achilles with a garland and Hephaestion did the same with the tomb of Patroclus, and they ran a race, naked, to honour their dead heroes. Arrian and Plutarch draw no conclusions from this.

In Aelian's account it is said that during garlanding of the tomb of Patroclus, Hephaestion was "riddling [ainittomenos] that he too was a beloved (eromenos) of Alexander, just as Patroclus was of Achilles." The statement shows Achilles and Patroclus were perceived as lovers by Hephaestion and it also ostensibly depicts him identifying himself as Alexander's sexual partner. However, Daniel Ogden points that sentence is unclear whether Hephaestion in Aelian's account calls himself "beloved" of Alexander or if he simply makes a joke to the witnesses of his act about the ambiguous nature of their relationship, just like the nature of Achilles and Patroclus's relationship was seen differently by various Greek and Roman authors.

According to Thomas R. Martin and Christopher W. Blackwell, by no means does the identification of Alexander and Hephaestion with Achilles and Patroclus equate to their being in a homosexual relationship as Homer, author of the Iliad, never suggested that Achilles and Patroclus had sexual relations. Martin and Blackwell dismiss concept of the pair as lovers, claiming it was written down by unspecified "later authors". However, their view is contradicted by the fact—already mentioned above—that Achilles and Patroclus were believed to be lovers by eminent writers as Aeschylus and Plato that had lived before Alexander and Hephaestion's time. Attic orator Aeschines, who was contemporary with them (albeit somewhat older), explicitly addressed the question in these terms: "...Homer, though he often speaks of Patroclus and Achilles, is silent about love and gives no name to their friendship; he thinks that the remarkable strength of their affection is obvious to the cultivated among his audience." Achilles and Patroclus were also believed to be lovers by Aelian (see above) and Appollodorus. Thus, according to Robin Lane Fox quite different conclusions can be drawn from those of Martin and Blackwell's:

It was a remarkable tribute, uniquely paid, and it is also Hephaestion's first mention in Alexander's career. Already the two were intimate, Patroclus and Achilles even to those around them; the comparison would remain to the end of their days and is proof of their life as lovers, for by Alexander's time, Achilles and Patroclus were agreed to have enjoyed the same relationship which Homer himself had never mentioned.

If Alexander and Hephaestion indeed were lovers, it remains contested among researchers how much public and socially accepted their relationship would have been. The opinions regarding how same-sex relationships were perceived in ancient Greece vary among the scholars. Thomas R. Martin and Christopher W. Blackwell claim "homosexual affairs" in the time of Alexander and Hephaestion were seen as "abnormal" by majority Greek standards of their time. But Andrew Chugg, Robin Lane Fox, Paul Cartledge, and others show very different views. Cartledge believes that attempts to "expunge all trace, or taint, of homosexuality" from Alexander and Hephaestion's relationship are "seriously misguided." Moreover, he notes that there was no stigma attached to homoerotic attachments in ancient Greece, and "almost certainly" Alexander and Hephaestion's love was physically expressed at one or more stages in their lives. Eva Cantarella claims that male homosexuality was widely permitted and ruled by law, and generally not frowned upon by the public to the extent to which it remained within the preset limits. For the Greeks, she claims, "homosexuality was not an exclusive choice. Loving another man was not an option out of the norm, different, somehow deviant. It was just a part of life experience; it was the show of an either sentimental or sexual drive that, over a lifetime, alternated and was associated (sometimes at the very same time) with love for a woman".

The pattern that same-sex love affairs followed, however, was not the same in every city-state. Jennifer Larson points out that during the time of democracy in Athens, such practices were subject to criticism and censure. Plato called such unions "unnatural" and even called for their prohibition. In Cartledge's opinion, there was no stigma associated to homoerotic attachments in ancient Greece, and "almost certainly" Alexander and Hephaestion's love was physically expressed at one or more stages in their lives; however he notes there was a stigma attached to being the passive sexual partner, and he expresses the view that being Alexander's "catamite" was not something that Hephaestion would have wished to boast about.

However, other researchers point the societal attitude towards same sex relationships could be different in Macedon than in Athens. As Robin Lane Fox says, "descendants of the Dorians were considered and even expected to be openly homosexual, especially among their ruling class, and the Macedonian kings had long insisted on their pure Dorian ancestry". Daniel Ogden compares possible sexual relationship between similar in age Alexander and Hephaestion to the same-sex relationships among adult male peers that appeared to be tolerated around the same time in Thebes (the most famous instance being lovers from the Sacred Band of Thebes), Elis and Sparta; he also notes the presence of other adult men known to have male lovers at Philip II and Alexander's court (examples include Philip II himself and Pausanias, and – during Alexander's own reign – hetairos Dimnus and his eromenos Nicomachus, as well as the royal pages like Hermolaus and Sostrates, and Epimenes and Charicles), which would suggest some societal tolerance.

=== Others ===
Among Alexander's other officers, it is possible that Hephaestion was closest to Perdiccas, because it was with Perdiccas that he went on the mission to take Peuceolatis and bridge the Indus. By that time, as Alexander's effective second-in-command, he could doubtless have chosen any officer he cared to name. They accomplished everything they set out to do with great success, which indicates that the two of them worked well together, and that Hephaestion found the irrepressible Perdiccas a congenial companion. It is notable that their two cavalry regiments in particular were selected by Alexander for the dangerous crossing of the river Hydaspes before the battle with the Indian king, Porus. On that occasion superb teamwork would have been of paramount importance.

However, outside the close-knit coterie of the Macedonian high command, he was not universally admired. This is clear from Arrian's comment about Alexander's grief: "All writers have agreed that it was great, but personal prejudice, for or against both Hephaestion and Alexander himself, has coloured the accounts of how he expressed it."

Yet given the factions and jealousies that arise in any court and that Hephaestion was supremely close to the greatest monarch the Western world had yet seen, it is remarkable how little enmity he inspired. Arrian mentions a quarrel with Alexander's secretary Eumenes but, because of a missing page in the text, the greater part of the detail is missing, leaving only the conclusion that something persuaded Hephaestion, though against his will, to make up the quarrel. However, Plutarch, who wrote about Eumenes in his series of Parallel Lives, mentions that it was about lodgings and a flute-player, so perhaps this was an instance of some deeper antagonism breaking out into a quarrel over a triviality. What that antagonism might have been, it is not possible to know, but someone with the closeness to the king of a secretary might well have felt some jealousy for Hephaestion's even greater closeness.

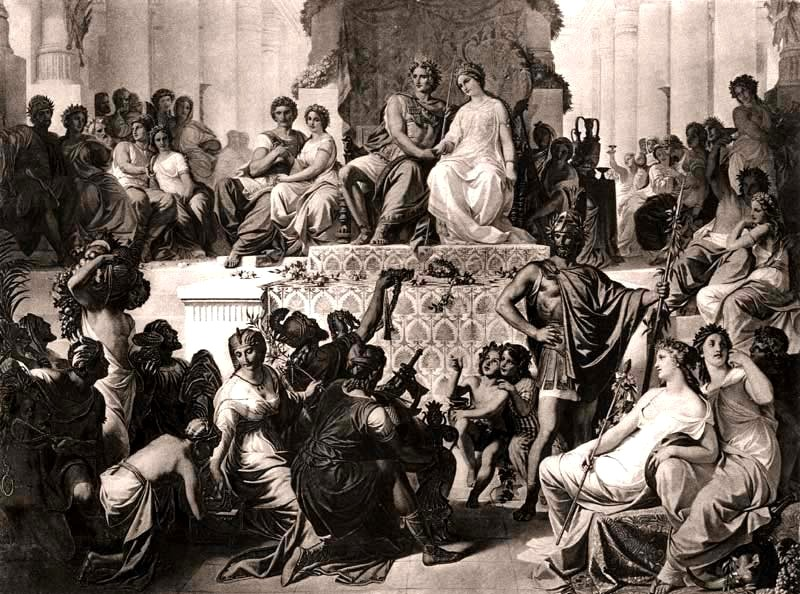
The weddings at Susa; Alexander to Stateira (right), and Hephaestion to Drypetis (left). Late 19th-century engraving.

In only one instance is Hephaestion known to have quarrelled with a fellow officer and that was with Craterus. In this instance it is easier to see that resentment might have been felt on both sides, for Craterus was one of those officers who vehemently disliked Alexander's policy of integrating Greek and Persian, whereas Hephaestion was very much in favour. Plutarch tells the story: "For this reason a feeling of hostility grew and festered between the two and they often came into open conflict. Once on the expedition to India they actually drew their swords and came to blows ..." Alexander, who also valued Craterus highly as a most competent officer, was forced to intervene and had stern words for both. It is a measure of how high feelings were running over this contentious issue that such a thing should have happened and also an indication of how closely Hephaestion identified Alexander's wishes with his own. Hephaestion gave perhaps the ultimate proof of this in the summer of 324 BC, when he accepted as his wife Drypetis, daughter of Darius and sister to Alexander's own second wife Stateira. Of his short married life nothing is known, except that at the time of Alexander's own death, eight months after Hephaestion's, Drypetis was still mourning the husband to whom she had been married for only four months.

For Alexander to marry a daughter of Darius made good political sense, allying himself firmly with the Persian ruling class, but for Hephaestion to marry her sister shows the high esteem in which Alexander held him, bringing him into the royal family itself. They became brothers-in-law, and yet there was more to it than that. Arrian says that Alexander "wanted to be uncle to Hephaestion's children". Thus it is possible to imagine Alexander and Hephaestion hoping that their respective offspring might unite their lines and that, ultimately, the crown of Macedon and Persia might be worn by one who was a descendant of them both.

== Death and funeral ==
=== Death ===
In spring 324 BC Hephaestion left Susa, where he had been married, and accompanied Alexander and the rest of the army as they travelled towards Ecbatana. They arrived in the autumn and it was there, during games and festivals, that Hephaestion fell ill with a fever. Arrian says that after the fever had run for seven days, Alexander had to be summoned from the games to Hephaestion, who was seriously ill. He did not arrive in time; by the time he got there, Hephaestion was dead. Plutarch says that being a young man and a soldier, Hephaestion had ignored medical advice. As soon as his doctor, Glaucias, had gone off to the theatre, he ate a large breakfast, consisting of a boiled fowl and a cooler of wine, and then fell sick and died.

Piecing the accounts together, it seems as if Hephaestion's fever had run its course for seven days, after which time he was sufficiently recovered for his doctor, and Alexander himself, to feel it was safe to leave him, and for Hephaestion to feel hungry. His meal, however, seems to have caused a relapse that led to his rapid death. Precisely why this should have happened is not known. As Mary Renault says, "This sudden crisis in a young, convalescent man is hard to account for." The explanation that fits most of the facts is that the fever was typhoid and that solid food perforated the ulcerated intestine that the typhoid would have caused. This would have led to internal bleeding, though it would be unusual in that case for death to follow quite as swiftly as it seems to have done here. For that reason, it is not possible altogether to discount other possible explanations.

Following Hephaestion's death his body was either cremated (and the ashes later taken to Babylon) or embalmed and conveyed there, where an enormous funeral pyre was erected for him. The general Eumenes suggested that divine honors be given to Hephaestion; this was later done.

Hephaestion's death is dealt with at greater length by the ancient sources than any of the events of his life, because of its profound effect upon Alexander. Plutarch says that "Alexander's grief was uncontrollable" and adds that he ordered many signs of mourning, notably that the manes and tails of all horses should be shorn, the demolition of the battlements of the neighbouring cities and the banning of flutes and every other kind of music. Besides the account reported in a previous section about the immediate manifestations of despair by Alexander on his friend's body, Arrian also relates that "until the third day after Hephaestion's death, Alexander neither tasted food nor paid any attention to his personal appearance, but lay on the ground either bewailing or silently mourning," and that he had the doctor, Glaucias, hanged for his lack of care. Arrian also mentions Alexander ordering the shrine of Asclepios in Ecbatana to be razed to the ground, and that he cut his hair short in mourning, this last a poignant reminder of Achilles' last gift to Patroclus on his funeral pyre:

Thus o'er Patroclus while the hero prayed,
on his cold hand the sacred lock he laid.
Once more afresh the Grecian sorrows flow:
And now the sun had set upon their woe.

Another hint that Alexander looked to Achilles to help him to express his grief may be found in the campaign, shortly following these events, against a tribe called the Cossaeans. Plutarch says they were massacred as an offering to the spirit of Hephaestion, and it is quite possible to imagine that to Alexander this might have followed in spirit with Achilles' killing of "twelve high-born youths" beside Patroclus' funeral pyre.

Alexander ordered a period of mourning throughout the empire and "many of the Companions, out of respect for Alexander, dedicated themselves and their arms to the dead man". The army, too, remembered him; Alexander did not appoint anyone to take Hephaestion's place as commander of the Companion cavalry; he "wished Hephaestion's name to be preserved always in connection with it, so Hephaestion's Regiment it continued to be called, and Hephaestion's image continued to be carried before it".

Messengers were sent to the oracle at Siwa to ask if Amon would permit Hephaestion to be worshipped as a god. When the reply came saying he might be worshipped not as a god, but as a divine hero, Alexander was pleased and "from that day forward saw that his friend was honoured with a hero's rites". He saw to it that shrines were erected to Hephaestion's memory, and evidence that the cult took hold can be found in a simple votary plaque now in Archaeological Museum of Thessaloniki, inscribed, "To the Hero Hephaestion".

=== Funeral ===
Hephaestion was given a magnificent funeral. Its cost is variously given in the sources as 10,000 talents or 12,000 talents, about $200,000,000 or $240,000,000 in the early 21st century's money. Alexander himself drove the funeral carriage part of the way back to Babylon with some of the driving entrusted to Hephaestion's friend Perdiccas. At Babylon, funeral games were held in Hephaestion's honour. The contests ranged from literature to athletics and 3,000 competitors took part, the festival eclipsing anything that had gone before both in cost and in number of participants. Plutarch says that Alexander planned to spend ten thousand talents on the funeral and the tomb. He employed Stasicrates, "as this artist was famous for his innovations, which combined an exceptional degree of magnificence, audacity and ostentation", to design the pyre for Hephaestion.

The pyre was sixty metres high, square in shape and built in stepped levels. The first level was decorated with two hundred and forty ships with golden prows, each of these adorned with armed figures with red banners filling the spaces between. On the second level were torches with snakes at the base, golden wreaths in the middle and at the top, flames surmounted by eagles. The third level showed a hunting scene, and the fourth a battle of centaurs, all done in gold. On the fifth level, also in gold, were lions and bulls, and on the sixth the arms of Macedon and Persia. The seventh and final level bore sculptures of sirens, hollowed out to conceal a choir who would sing a lament. It is possible that the pyre was not burnt, but that it was actually intended as a tomb or lasting memorial; if so, it is likely that it was never completed, as there are references to expensive, uncompleted projects at the time of Alexander's own death.

One final tribute remained, and it is compelling in its simplicity and in what it reveals about the high esteem in which Hephaestion was held by Alexander. On the day of the funeral, he gave orders that the sacred flame in the temple should be extinguished. Normally, this was only done on the death of the Great King himself.

=== Amphipolis Tomb ===
Based on a monogram found in the Amphipolis Tomb in northern Greece, the lead archaeologist, Katerina Peristeri, claims that the whole tumulus was a funerary monument for Hephaestion, built between 325 and 300 BC.

=== Hamadan Stone Lion ===
The Hamadan Stone Lion is a historical monument in Hamadan, Iran. In 1968 Heinz Luschey demonstrated that the lion is a Hellenistic sculpture and that the lion monument at Chaeronea (erected in 338 BC) is comparable. His interpretation that it was built by the orders of Alexander the Great to commemorate the death of Hephaestion in 324 BC, has been adopted by Iran's Cultural Heritage Organization

== Portrayals of Hephaestion in fiction ==
- Hephaestion is a major character in Mary Renault's novels Fire from Heaven and The Persian Boy.
- Hephaestion is a major character is Jeanne Reames's novels Dancing with the Lion: Becoming and Rise.
