= Agatho =

Agatho may refer to:

- Pope Agatho (577–681), a pope of the Catholic Church
- Pope Agatho of Alexandria (died 680), Pope of Alexandria and Patriarch of the See of St. Mark
- Agatho, the martyred son of Hor and Susia

== See also ==
- Agathon (name)
- Agathos, Greek language for "good"
