= C. miserabilis =

C. miserabilis may refer to:

- Ctenus miserabilis, a spider species in the genus Ctenus
- Cyanophrys miserabilis, a butterfly species in the genus Cyanophrys

== See also ==
- Miserabilis (disambiguation)
