= Adventure Story (1961 TV play) =

- Genre: Historical Drama
- Created by: Terence Rattigan
- Starring: Sean Connery; William Russell
- Country of origin: United Kingdom
- Original language: English

Production
- Producer: Rudolph Cartier
- Running time: 111 min.

Original release
- Network: BBC1
- Release: 12 June 1961

Adventure Story is a British television play, based on the stage play by Terence Rattigan, and tells the story of Alexander the Great and his conquest of Persia. It featured Sean Connery in his first starring role and was praised at the time for its acting.

== Cast ==
- Sean Connery - Alexander the Great
- William Russell - Hephaestion
- Lyndon Brook - Philotas
- William Devlin - Parmenion, Philotas' Father
- Alex Scott - Ptolemy
- Edward Cast - Perdiccas
- Michael Brennan - Father Cleitus
- Noel Hood - The Pythia, Priestess of Apollo
- Walter Brown - Polystratos
- Paul Stassino - King Darius
- Margaretta Scott - Queen Mother
- Ann Dimitri - Queen Stateira
- Pauline Knight - Princess Stateira
- Alan Tilvern - Prince Bessus, Satrap of Bactria
- Bandana Das Gupta - Roxana
- Tutte Lemkow - Mazeres, The King's Chamberlain
- Walter Randall - Palace Official
- Simon Levy - Persian Officer

== Critical reception ==
A contemporary critic in The Times wrote of Connery's performance, "certain inflexions and swift deliberations of gesture at times made one feel that the part had found the young Olivier it needs," and wrote that Rudolph Cartier's production, "had the freedom of spaciousness to which this producer has accustomed us, and all the acting was on a big scale, to match Mr Clifford Hatch's settings." and more recently, reviewing it on DVD, Screenplaystv wrote, "the first half and more of the drama plays like a slightly ludicrous historical pageant, and only towards the end does it begin to explore something more ambitious and ambivalent...Sean Connery is most definitely the reason to watch it now,...there is a lavish quality to the staging (which even stretches to three real horses at one point), and the sumptuous costumes are shown to advantage in the fine print on the DVD."
