= Nicomachus of Macedon =

Contemporary with Alexander the Great

Nicomachus (Greek: Νικόμαχος) was a Macedonian of humble birth, brother of Cebalinus and eromenos of Dimnus, whose "conspiracy" set the stage for the so-called Philotas affair. Curtius calls him exoletus (6.7.2, 8) and scortum (6.7.33). It appears that Nicomachus himself escaped punishment.
