= Agathon (name) =

Male given name

Agathon (Anc. Gr. Ἀγάθων) is a given name.

== Russian name ==
In Russian, in 1924–1930, the name "Агато́н" (Agaton) was included into various Soviet calendars, which included the new and often artificially created names promoting the new Soviet realities and encouraging the break with the tradition of using the names in the Synodal Menologia. The name is a Westernized form of the more traditional name Agafon.

== Classical antiquity ==
- Agathon, an Athenian tragic poet of the 5th century BC
- Plato's Form of The Good
- Agathon, son of the Macedonian Philotas, and the brother of Parmenion and Asander, was given as a hostage to Antigonus in 313 BC, by his brother Asander, satrap of Caria, but was taken back again by Asander in a few days. Agathon had a son, named Asander, who is mentioned in a Greek inscription.
- Agathon of Samos, who wrote a work on Scythia and another on rivers.
- Agathon, at first Reader, then Librarian, at Constantinople. In 680 AD, during his Readership, he was Notary or Reporter at the 6th General Council, which condemned the Monothelite heresy. He sent copies of the acts, written by himself, to the five Patriarchates. In 712 AD he wrote a short treatise, still extant in Greek, on the attempts of Philippicus Bardanes to revive Monothelitism.
- Agathon, son of Priam and prince of Troy, is mentioned in the Iliad as being one of the last surviving princes.
- Saint Agathon the Stylite
- Agathon, one of the Desert Fathers who lived in Scetis, Lower Egypt
- St Agathon

== Fictional characters ==
- Karl Agathon, a fictional character on the re-imagined Battlestar Galactica 2004 TV series
- Agaton Sax, a fictional detective in the eponymous comedic detective novels written for children by Swedish author Nils-Olof Franzén
