= Agathon (disambiguation) =

Agathon was an Athenian poet.

Agathon may also refer to:

- Form of the Good, a concept in the philosophy of Plato.
- Agathon (monk), Egyptian Christian monk
- Agathon (mythology), son of King Priam of Troy
- Agathon (son of Tyrimmas), an officer of Alexander the Great
- Agathon (son of Philotas), the brother of Ancient Macedonian Generals Parmenion and Asander
- Agathon (name), a given name
- Agathon, a genus of flies
- Agathon (name), title-character in 1766 German novel by Christoph Martin Wieland
