= Cebalinus =

Cebalinus or Kebalinos (Ancient Greek: Κεβαλῖνος) was a Macedonian who lived at the time of Alexander the Great. He was the brother of Nicomachus, the eromenos of Dimnus, who instigated a plot against Alexander in 330 BC. When Dimnus revealed the plot to Nicomachus, Nicomachus revealed it to Cebalinus. Cebalinus reported this plot to Philotas, but when on the day of the planned assassination, Philotas had still not told Alexander, he also told Metro, a royal page. Metro reported the plot to Alexander, and took Cebalinus to see him.
