= Philotas (father of Parmenion) =

- Native name: Φιλώτας
- Allegiance: Macedonia
- Children: Parmenion, Asander, Agathon

Philotas (Greek: Φιλώτας; lived 4th century BC) was a Macedonian soldier and noble from Upper Macedonia.

He was the father of Parmenion, the general of Alexander the Great (336 — 323 BC). Parmenion would go on to name his son after his father. It appears that he had two other sons, Asander and Agathon.
