= Siege of Miletus =

334 BC siege in southern Ionia

- Part of the Wars of Alexander the Great
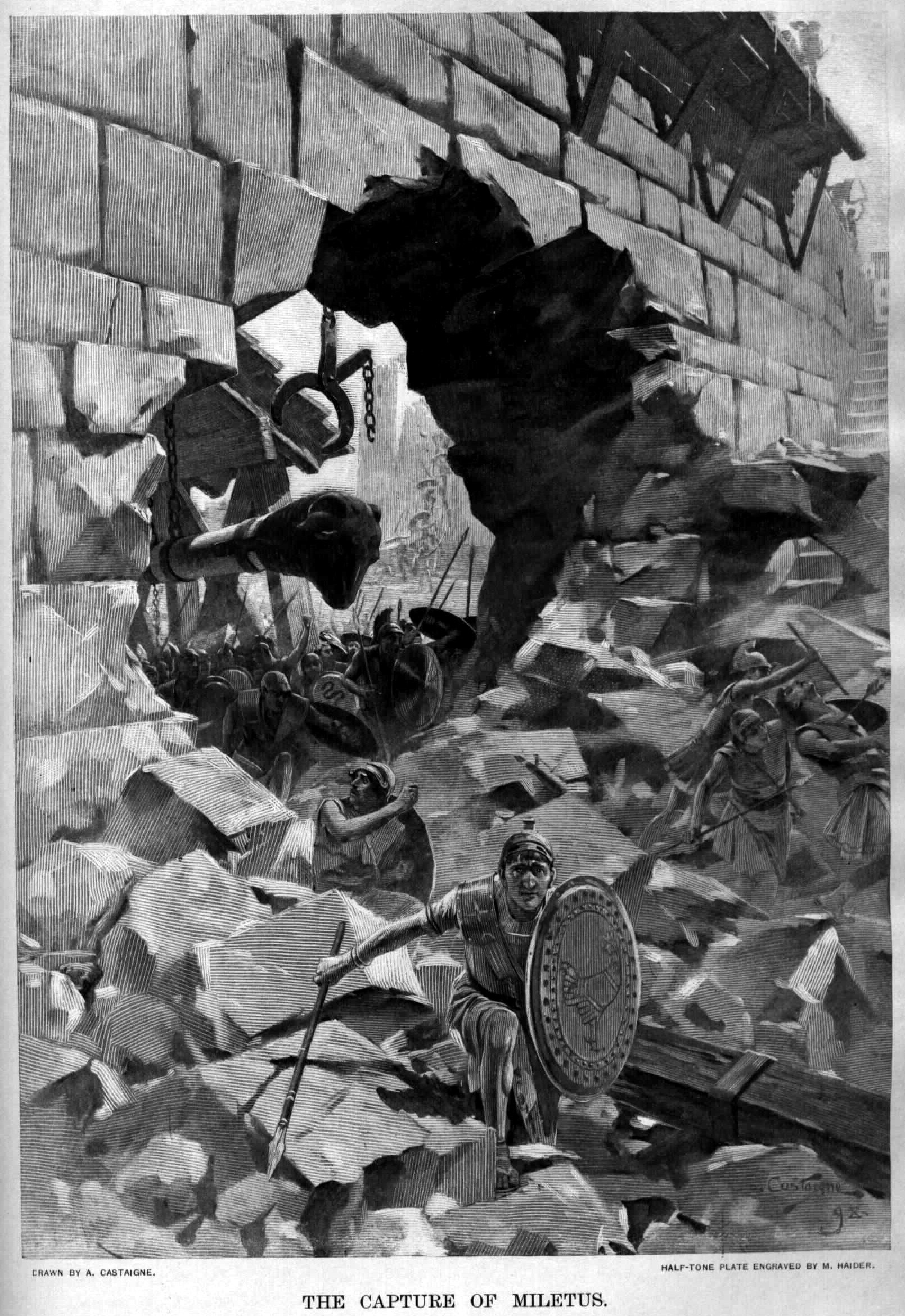
- The capture of Miletus by Andre Castaigne
| Date | 334 BC |
| Location | Miletus, Ionia (modern-day Balat, Didim, Aydın Province, Turkey) 37°31′49″N 27°16′42″E |
| Result | Macedonian victory |
| Territorial changes | Alexander controls Ionia |

Belligerents
| Macedonian Empire; Hellenic League | Achaemenid Empire Milesian allies |

Commanders and leaders
| Alexander the Great; Nicanor | Hegesistratus |

Strength
| 160 ships | 400 ships (not engaged); 300 Milesians |

Casualties and losses
| Light | Heavy |
- Location of the siege of Miletus

Alexander the Great
current battle

The siege of Miletus was Alexander the Great's first siege and naval encounter with the Achaemenid Empire. This siege was directed against Miletus, a city in southern Ionia, which is now located in the Aydın province of modern-day Turkey. During the battle, Parmenion's son Philotas would be key in preventing the Persian Navy from finding safe anchorage.
