= Bequest to the Nation =

Bequest to the Nation may refer to:

- A Bequest to the Nation, a 1970 play by Terence Rattigan
- Bequest to the Nation (film), a 1973 film adaptation
