= Agathion =

Agathion may refer to:

- Familiar, a supernatural entity in European folklore which appears in the shape of a human or an animal
- Agathinon (Dungeons & Dragons), a fictional species of celestial beings in Dungeons & Dragon
- Agathion, one of the layers of the fictional Outer Plane of Pandemonium in Dungeons & Dragon

== See also ==
- Agathon (disambiguation)
