= Glaucias (physician, 4th century BC) =

Glaucias (Greek: Γλαυκίας; also Glaukos (Γλαῦκος) or Glaucus) was the physician who attended Hephaestion during his final illness and was executed on Alexander's orders.
