= Hegesistratus =

Ancient greek name

Hegesistratus (Ancient Greek: Ἡγησίστρατος) is an ancient Greek name. Some people with this name were:

1. A Greek diviner for Mardonius during the Greco-Persian Wars. Originally an Elean, he had been captured by the Spartans and put in bonds. He escaped by cutting off a piece of his own foot and replaced it with a wooden one; however, he was captured again at Zacynthus and put to death. This story is mentioned in the ninth book (chapter 37) of the Histories written by Herodotus.
2. An emissary from Samos to the Greeks before the Battle of Mycale.
3. A despot of Sigeum.
4. An Ephesian committed a murder in his family, and fled to Delphi; on consulting the oracle what place to settle in, the answer was, that when he should come to a place where he should see the country people dancing with garlands of olive-leaves, he should settle there. He travelled and found what the oracle told him, and there built the city Elaeus.
5. Democritus was the son of Hegesistratus, though some say of Athenocritus, and others of Damasippus.
6. The governor of Miletus, during the Siege of Miletus by Alexander the Great.
