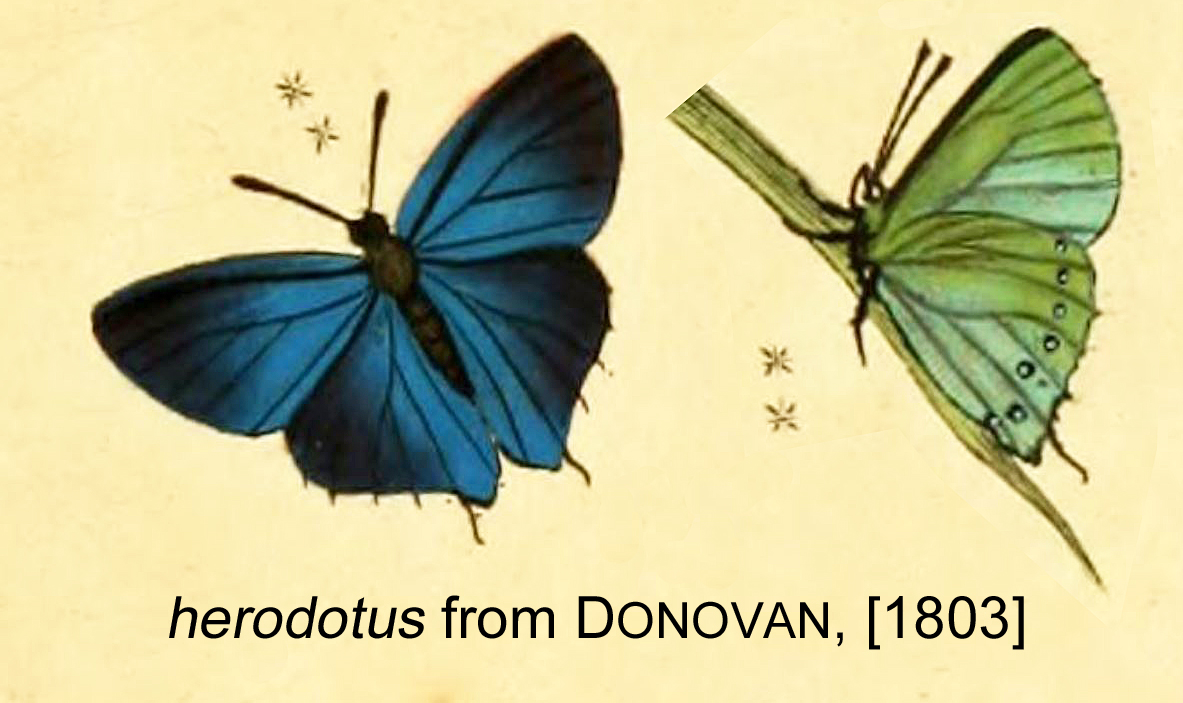

Scientific classification
- Domain: Eukaryota
- Kingdom: Animalia
- Phylum: Arthropoda
- Class: Insecta
- Order: Lepidoptera
- Family: Lycaenidae
- Genus: Cyanophrys
- Species: C. herodotus

Binomial name
- Cyanophrys herodotus (Fabricius, 1793)

Synonyms
- Hesperia herodotus Fabricius, 1793; Thecla herodotus; Thecla leucania Hewitson, 1868; Thecla sicrana E. D. Jones, 1912; Thecla detesta Clench, 1946; Cyanophrys circumcyanophrys d'Abrera, 1995; Cyanophrys amyntoides d'Abrera, 1995; Cyanophrys sicranoides d'Abrera, 1995; Callophrys brazilensis d'Abrera, 1995; Cyanophrys amyntoides Johnson & Le Crom, 1997; Cyanophrys distractus howei Johnson & Le Crom, 1997; Cyanophrys pseudocallophria Johnson & Le Crom, 1997; Cyanophrys descimoni Johnson & Le Crom, 1997; Cyanophrys gigantus Johnson & Le Crom, 1997; Cyanophrys rachelae Johnson & Le Crom, 1997; Plesiocyanophrys ricardo Johnson & Kruse, 1997; Plesiocyanophrys brazilensis Johnson & Kruse, 1997; Cyanophrys sullivani Johnson & Kruse, 1997

= Cyanophrys herodotus =

Species of butterfly

Cyanophrys herodotus, the tropical green hairstreak or tropical greenstreak, is a butterfly of the family Lycaenidae. It was described by Johan Christian Fabricius in 1793. It is found in Mexico, Guatemala, Panama, Nicaragua, Colombia, Ecuador, Peru, Bolivia, Brazil, Paraguay and Argentina. Rare strays can be found as far north as southern Texas. The habitat consists of open disturbed areas in tropical and subtropical rainforests and cloudforests at altitudes ranging from 600 to about 2,000 meters.

The wingspan is 22–29 mm. Adults are on wing from late May to late October in southern Texas. They are on wing year-round in Central America and Mexico. They feed on flower nectar.

The larvae feed on the leaves and flowers of various shrubs and trees, including Lantana camara, Cornutia grandifolia, Clerodendron paniculatum, Lithraea brasiliensis, Schinus molle, Mangifera indica and Mikania species.
