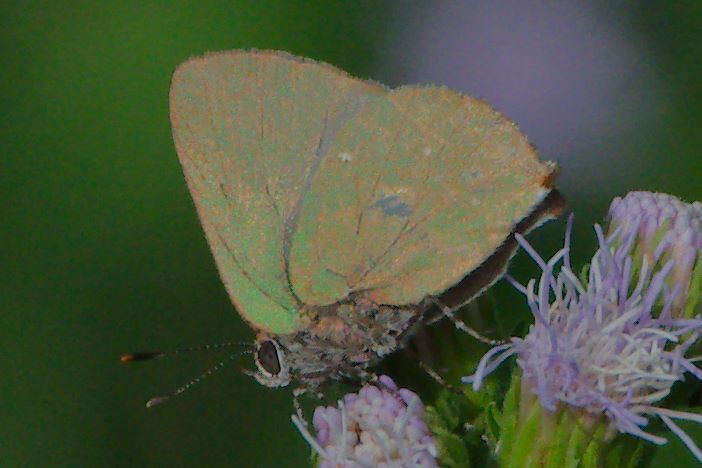

Scientific classification
- Kingdom: Animalia
- Phylum: Arthropoda
- Clade: Pancrustacea
- Class: Insecta
- Order: Lepidoptera
- Family: Lycaenidae
- Tribe: Eumaeini
- Genus: Cyanophrys
- Species: C. goodsoni

Binomial name
- Cyanophrys goodsoni (Clench, 1946)

= Cyanophrys goodsoni =

Species of butterfly

Cyanophrys goodsoni, known generally as the Goodson's greenstreak or Goodson's hairstreak, is a species of hairstreak butterfly in the family Lycaenidae. It is found in North America.
