= Adventure Story (play) =

- First edition cover (published by Samuel French Ltd.)
- Written by: Terence Rattigan
- Original language: English

Premiere
- Date premiered: 17 March 1949
- Place premiered: St. James's Theatre

Adventure Story is a 1949, play by the English dramatist Terence Rattigan. The play tells the story of Alexander the Great and his conquests.

In this play Rattigan portrays the historical Alexander faithfully, at the same time revealing that his life was what it was because he was the kind of person who very well might have wept because nothing remained to conquer.

The play focuses on the transformation of Alexander after his conquest of Persia from a military adventurist to an uncompromising despot with grand vision of a world empire which estranges him from his erstwhile friends. Driven by a deep-felt insecurity, he has to kill people close to him including even the father figure Cleitus. He tries to justify his actions in the name of his dreams of the world empire, but is haunted by loneliness in the end

The play holds a deeper significance, that the conquests of Alexander were actually trials to find himself and achieve spiritual enlightenment, through becoming a god (see Theosis).

The play ends with a nihilistic tone, that Alexander was to die and fade after all, his last words in the play are 'Who is to succeed me to the throne of Asia? Who shall I condemn to death?'

== Original production ==
The play opened at the St. James's Theatre on 17 March 1949, with Paul Scofield in his first starring West End role, as Alexander. Stanley Baker also played a role.

== Adaptations ==
The BBC transmitted a live TV version of the play in 1950, starring Andrew Osborn as Alexander; and another in 1961, a recording of which has survived, directed by Rudolph Cartier, with Sean Connery in the role. Of his performance, The Times wrote, "certain inflexions and swift deliberations of gesture at times made one feel that the part had found the young Olivier it needs."
