= Hamadan Stone Lion =

Historic monument in Hamadan, Iran

Stone Lion

- Location within Iran
- 34°47′10″N 48°31′27″E
- Location: Hamadan, Iran

Iran National Heritage List
- Official name: Stone Lion
- Type: Sculpture
- Designated: 1932
- Reference no.: 93
- Conservation organization: Cultural Heritage, Handicrafts and Tourism Organization of Iran

The Stone Lion of Hamadan (Persian: شیر سنگی همدان, romanized: Šir-e Sangi-ye Hamedân) is a historical monument in Hamadan, Iran.

The stone lion – one part of the 'Lions' Gate' – sits on a hill.

When first built, this statue had a twin counterpart for which they both constituted the old gate of the city. During the Muslim conquest of Persia, the victorious Arabs referred to the gate as bâb ul-asad (Persian: باب‌الاسد, "the lions' gate").

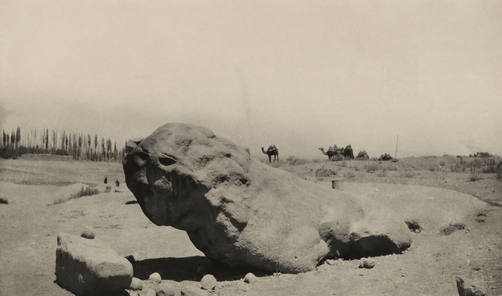
The Stone Lion in 1921

The gates were demolished in 931 AD as the Deylamids took over the city.

Mardāvij unsuccessfully tried transporting one of the lions to Ray. Angered by the failure to move them, he ordered them to be demolished. One lion was completely destroyed, while the other had its arm broken and pulled to the ground. The half-demolished lion lay on its side on the ground until 1949, when it was raised again, using a supplemental arm that was built into it. In 1968, Heinz Luschey demonstrated that the lion is a Hellenistic sculpture and that the lion monument at Chaeronea (erected in 338 BC) is comparable. His interpretation was that it was built by the orders of Alexander the Great to commemorate the death of his close companion Hephaestion in 324 BC. It is adopted by Iran's Cultural Heritage Organization.
