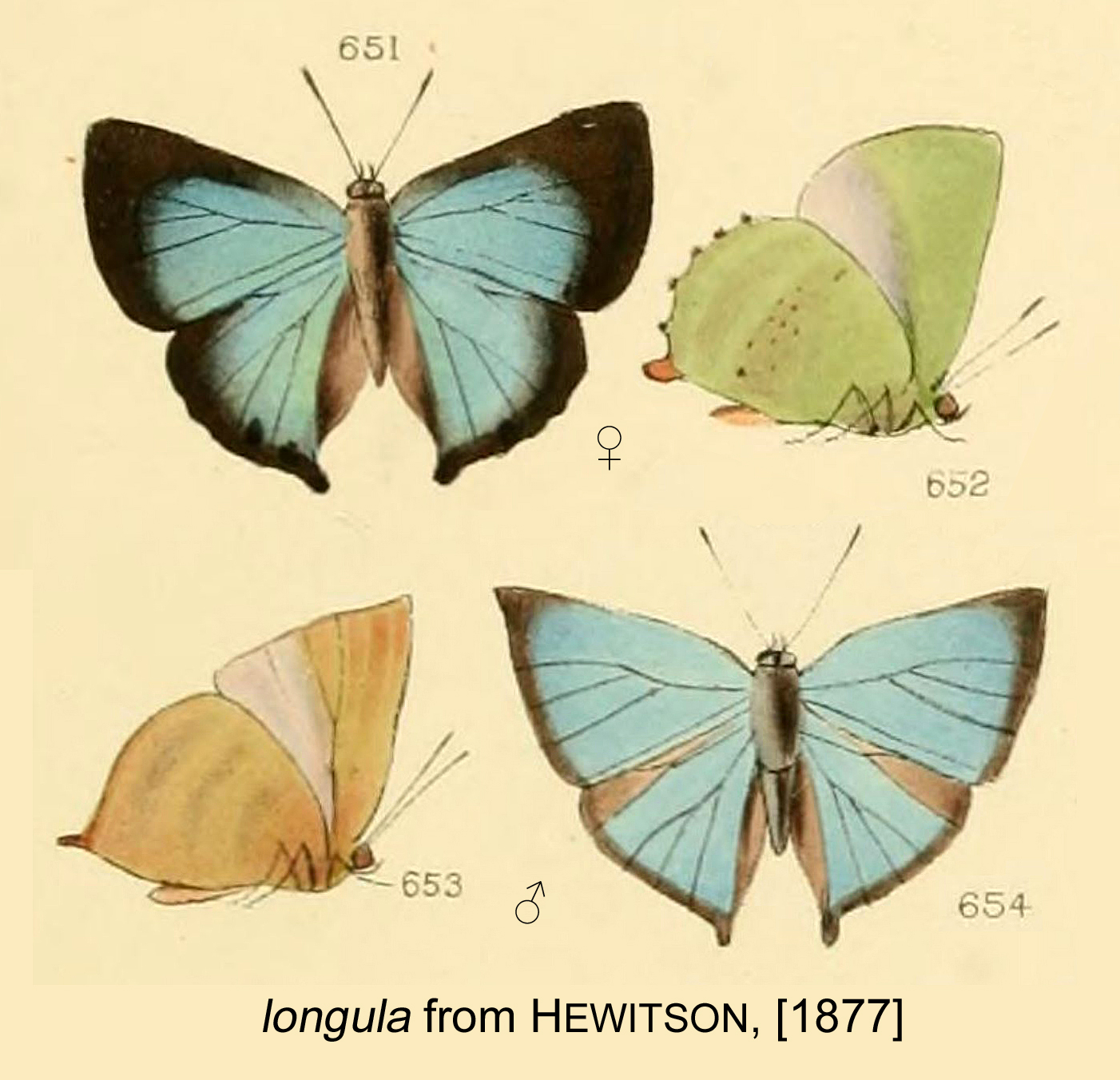

Scientific classification
- Kingdom: Animalia
- Phylum: Arthropoda
- Class: Insecta
- Order: Lepidoptera
- Family: Lycaenidae
- Genus: Cyanophrys
- Species: C. longula

Binomial name
- Cyanophrys longula (Hewitson, 1868)

Synonyms
- Thecla longula Hewitson, 1868; Strymon pastor Butler & H. Druce, 1872

= Cyanophrys longula =

Long-winged greenstreak

Species of butterfly

Cyanophrys longula, the long-winged greenstreak, is a butterfly in the family Lycaenidae. The species was first described by William Chapman Hewitson in 1868. It is found in Mexico, with strays recorded from south-eastern Arizona. It has also been recorded from Hawaii.

The wingspan is 21–30 mm. Adults are on wing from March to May and from August to December in Mexico.

The larvae feed on a wide range of plants, including species from the families Asteraceae and Verbenaceae.
