= Nicanor (son of Parmenion) =

4th-century BC Macedonian officer

Nicanor (/naɪˈkeɪnər/; Greek: Nικάνωρ Nīkā́nōr; died 330 BC), son of Parmenion, was a distinguished officer in the service of Alexander the Great. He is first mentioned at the passage of the Danube river, in the expedition of Alexander against the Getae, 335, when he led the phalanx. But during the expedition into Asia he appears to have uniformly held the chief command of the body of troops called the Hypaspists (υπασπισται) shield-bearers or foot-guards, numbering three units of 1,000 men. As his brother Philotas did that of the εταιρoι, or horse-guards. We find him mentioned, as holding this post, in the three great battles of the Granicus, of Issus, and of Gaugamela. He afterwards accompanied Alexander with a part of the troops under his command, during the rapid march of the king in pursuit of the king Darius III Codomannus in 330; which was probably his last service, as he died of disease shortly afterwards, during the advance of Alexander into Bactria. His death at this juncture was considered a fortunate event, as it prevented him from participating either in the designs or the fate of his brother Philotas.
