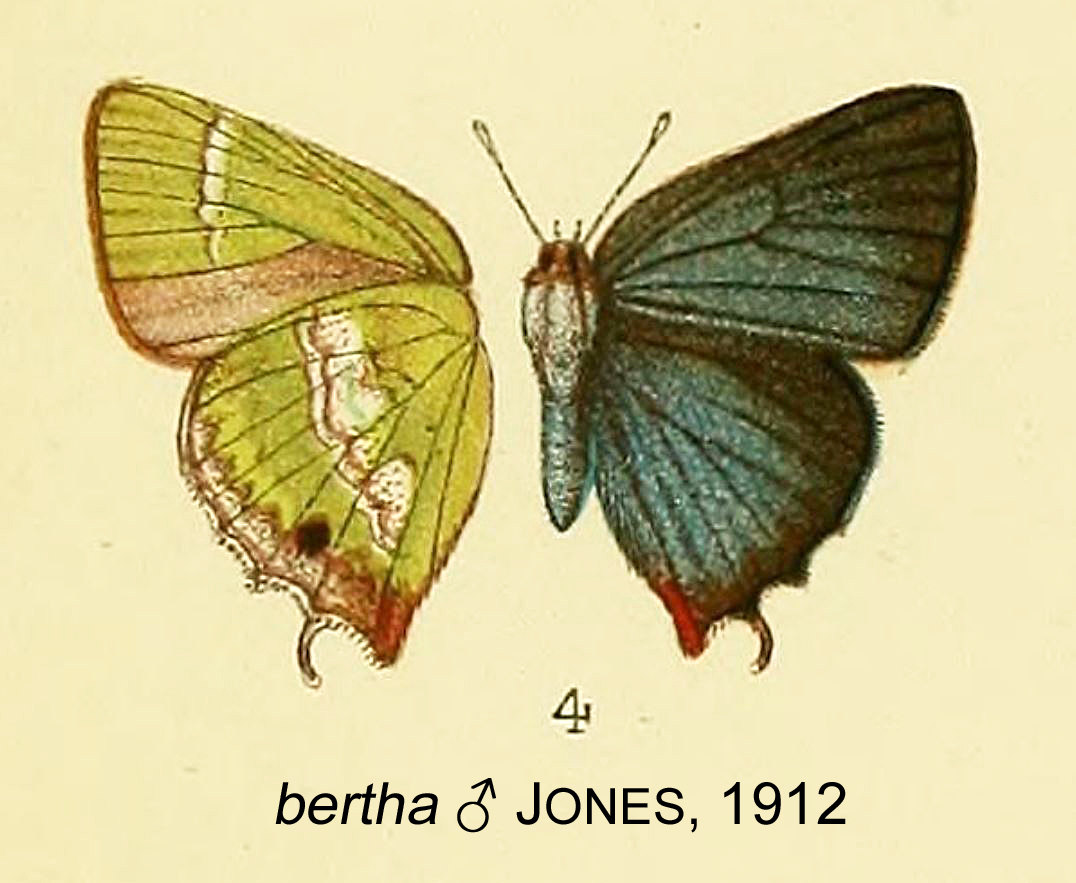

Conservation status
- Vulnerable (IUCN 2.3)

Scientific classification
- Kingdom: Animalia
- Phylum: Arthropoda
- Class: Insecta
- Order: Lepidoptera
- Family: Lycaenidae
- Genus: Cyanophrys
- Species: C. bertha

Binomial name
- Cyanophrys bertha E. D. Jones, 1912

= Cyanophrys bertha =

Species of butterfly

Cyanophrys bertha is a species of butterfly in the family Lycaenidae first described by E. Dukinfield Jones in 1912. It is endemic to Brazil.
