= Philotas =

Macedonian general (365 BC – 330 BC)

General Philotas
- Φιλώτας
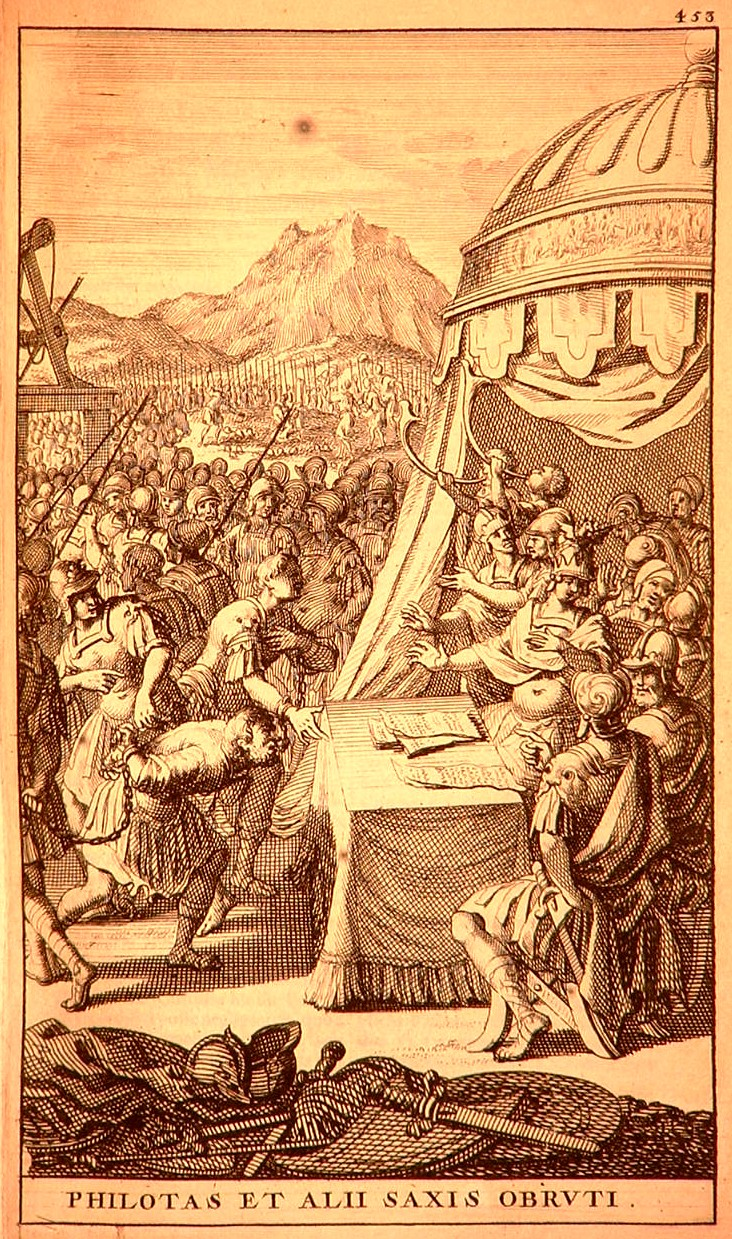
- Born: 365 BC
- Died: October 330 BC (aged 34-35)
- Relatives: Parmenion (father), Nikanor and Hector (brothers), Asander and Agathon (uncles)
- Military career
- Allegiance: Macedonia
- Rank: Commander of the Companion Cavalry
- Commands: Companion Cavalry
- Conflicts: Wars of Alexander the Great: Battle of the Granicus; Siege of Miletus; Siege of Tyre

Philotas (Greek: Φιλώτας; 365 BC – October 330 BC) was the eldest son of Parmenion, one of Alexander the Great's most experienced and talented generals. He rose to command the Companion Cavalry, but was accused of conspiring against Alexander and executed.

== Biography ==
When Alexander became king of Macedonia (336 BC) with Parmenion's support, he and his relations were rewarded with offices and commissions. Philotas was promoted, from a commander of a cavalry squadron to commander of the Companions, the corps of Macedonian cavalry that also provided bodyguards and attendants to the King. In battle, Alexander rode with and led this cavalry corps; they were, literally, his "companions," hence the name. Philotas, though a highly capable officer, was widely perceived as arrogant and pompous; he was never able to master the role of courtier, was often a center of conflict, and often earned the King's disfavour. He would serve alongside Alexander in numerous battles, fighting at the Battle of the Granicus, the Siege of Miletus, and the Siege of Tyre.

In the latter part of 330 BC, while with Alexander in the area of today's Afghanistan during the conquest of the Achaemenid Empire, Philotas was accused of conspiring against Alexander, due to being aware of Dimnus's plot and not informing Alexander. He had been subject to similar reports previously, though the case against him in 330 BC was more serious; his accusers included the commander Coenus, who was married to Philotas' sister. Philotas was tried and convicted, tortured to reveal the extent of the conspiracy, implicating his father, then stoned or speared to death with other convicted plotters. The execution of Philotas necessitated the removal of Parmenion, who, while innocent of any plotting, was judged unreliable once his son and heir had been put to death. Alexander sent assassins to kill Parmenion before the news of his son's execution reached him. Following his execution, command of the Companions was split between two officers.

== In literature and film ==
The story of Philotas was dramatized in 1604 by the English poet and playwright Samuel Daniel. A performance of the eponymously named play earned Daniel the unwelcome scrutiny of the Privy Council, because of a perceived resemblance between the play's protagonist and Robert Devereux, Earl of Essex, executed for rebellion and treason in 1601. In 1731 a second play about his life Philotas was written by Philip Frowde and performed in London.

In the film Alexander (2004), Philotas is played by Joseph Morgan; in the 1961 television version of Terence Rattigan's play Adventure Story, Philotas is played by Lyndon Brook; and in the film Alexander the Great (1956), Philotas is played by Rubén Rojo.

=== Philotas by Gotthold Ephraim Lessing ===
The German dramatist and critic Gotthold Ephraim Lessing also adapted the story; his play Philotas dates to 1759. It was written during the Enlightenment and when Prussia was a major player in Germany.

The drama was also written during the Seven Years' War (1756–1763) between Prussia and Hannover, against France, Austria, Switzerland, and Spain for control over regions such as Silesia and Saxony.

The play tells the story of prince-commander Philotas, a young and impulsive heir, who is made prisoner during his first battle. While captive, Philotas is visited by King Arideus, a former friend of his father. While in warm dialogue with Philotas, Arideus tells him that his own son has also been made captive by the other side, and that both kings are planning an exchange of prisoners.

Soon afterwards, Philotas is seen by Parmenio, his father's messenger, who asks him about when the exchange of prisoners will take place. Philotas pleas with Parmenio for more time, and requests an extra day prior to the exchange.

Philotas then begins a heavy monologue, filled with moral and ethical questions, about whether remaining alive would better serve his father's interests, especially considering that he is in possession of Arideus' son.

Philotas concludes that the most appropriate thing to do is to kill himself, to preserve his father's dominion over the lands in dispute. He then manages to obtain a sword from Arideus, claiming it would 'fit him better' before meeting the squadron, something Arideus has asked him to do.

The legitimacy of Philotas' suicide is a subject of discussion in modern theatre and ethics education. A common question is whether Philotas' suicide was necessary, and whether Lessing desired to praise, or else criticise, the strong moral codes that dominated Prussia during the 18th century, which according to many scholars were key to the survival of the Prussian empire.

Among the values exalted by the Prussian morale were: prudence, modesty, hard work, honesty, fairness, courage, strictness with oneself, order, duty, punctuality, integrity, austerity, loyalty, and subordination to power.
