= Amyntor (Macedonian) =

4th-century BC Macedonian aristocrat

Amyntor (Ancient Greek: Ἀμύντωρ Amýntor "defender") was the name of a 4th-century BC Macedonian aristocrat, possibly of Athenian descent. He was the father of Hephaestion Amyntoros, who was a close companion and lieutenant to Alexander the Great. The full history of Hephaestion's lineage is unknown. However, Jeanne Reames has suggested that he descended from Athenian expatriates to Macedon. The most popular piece of evidence pointing to such a connection is in name-tracing. "Hephaestion" is the name of the Temple of Hephaestus overlooking the Ancient Agora of Athens, near the Acropolis, a name which hardly appears at all in Macedon during this time period.
