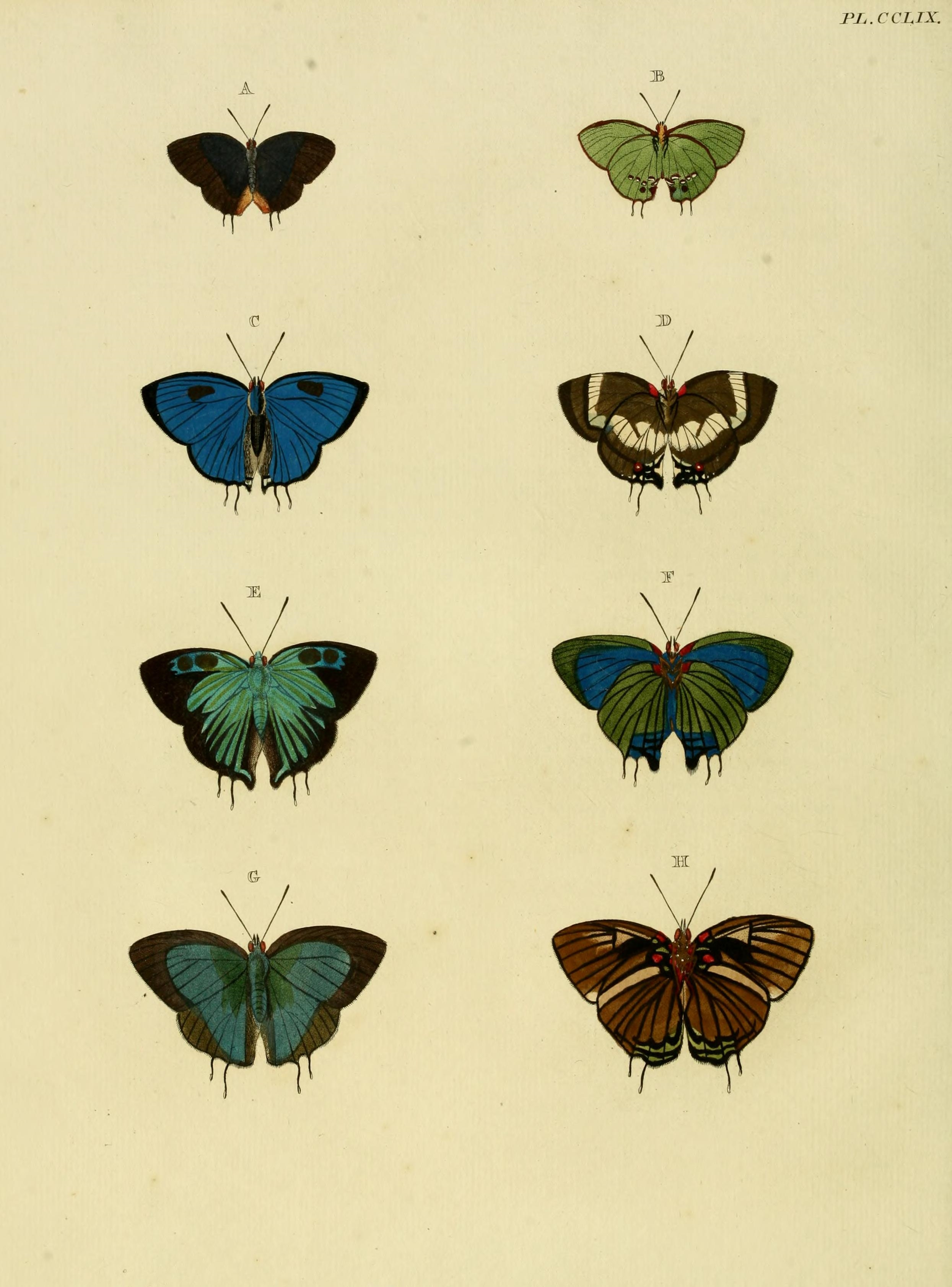
- Cyanophrys amyntor, A and B

Scientific classification
- Kingdom: Animalia
- Phylum: Arthropoda
- Class: Insecta
- Order: Lepidoptera
- Family: Lycaenidae
- Tribe: Eumaeini
- Genus: Cyanophrys; Clench, 1961

= Cyanophrys =

Butterfly genus in family Lycaenidae

Cyanophrys is a genus of butterflies in the family Lycaenidae erected by William J. Clench in 1961. The species of this genus are found in the Nearctic and Neotropical realms.

== Species ==
- Cyanophrys acaste (Prittwitz, 1865)
- Cyanophrys agricolor (Butler & H. Druce, 1872)
- Cyanophrys amyntor (Cramer, [1775])
- Cyanophrys argentinensis (Clench, 1946)
- Cyanophrys banosensis (Clench, 1944)
- Cyanophrys bertha (E. D. Jones, 1912)
- Cyanophrys crethona (Hewitson, 1874)
- Cyanophrys fusius (Godman & Salvin, [1887])
- Cyanophrys goodsoni (Clench, 1946)
- Cyanophrys herodotus (Fabricius, 1793)
- Cyanophrys longula (Hewitson, 1868)
- Cyanophrys miserabilis (Clench, 1946)
- Cyanophrys pseudolongula (Clench, 1944)
- Cyanophrys remus (Hewitson, 1868)
- Cyanophrys roraimiensis Johnson & Smith, 1993
- Cyanophrys velezi Johnson & Kruse, 1997

== Sources ==
- Gimenez Dixon, M. (1996). "Cyanophrys bertha". IUCN Red List of Threatened Species. 1996 e.T5990A12119218. doi:10.2305/IUCN.UK.1996.RLTS.T5990A12119218.en.
