= Hor and Susia =

Hor (also known as Abahor) and Susia (also known as Susanna) are martyrs of the Coptic Church. They were martyred with their sons Hor and Agatho. Their feast day is October 5.
