= A Bequest to the Nation =

Play written by Terence Rattigan

First edition (publ. Hamish Hamilton)

A Bequest to the Nation is a 1970 play by Terence Rattigan, based on his 1966 television play Nelson (full title – Nelson – A Portrait in Miniature). It recounts the events surrounding Horatio Nelson, his mistress Emma Hamilton, and his wife Frances Nisbet in the events immediately before, during and after the Battle of Trafalgar. It also includes various other historical characters such as Thomas Hardy and William Nelson. The title refers to Nelson leaving Emma and their child Horatia to the nation on his death.

== Productions ==
=== Stage ===
The play was first performed at the Theatre Royal, Haymarket on 23 September 1970. The director was Peter Glenville, with Zoe Caldwell playing Emma and Ian Holm as Nelson. Reviews were not favourable.

=== Television and film ===
In 1973, a film version was produced, with Glenda Jackson as Lady Hamilton, Peter Finch as Nelson and Margaret Leighton as Frances. Anthony Quayle played Lord Minto.

=== Radio ===
For the Trafalgar 200 commemorations in 2005, BBC Radio 3 broadcast a radio version on 16 October that year, with Janet McTeer as Emma, Kenneth Branagh as Nelson and Amanda Root as Frances. John Shrapnel played Lord Minto.
