= Dagobert von Gerhardt =

German writer

Dagobert von Gerhardt (pen-name Gerhard von Amyntor; 12 July 1831 in Liegnitz, Silesia – now Legnica, Poland – 24 February 1910 in Potsdam) was a German soldier, poet, and novelist.

== Biography ==
After attending the gymnasium at Glogau, he entered the Prussian army in Breslau, and advanced to the rank of major. He was severely wounded in the assault upon the fortifications of Düppel during the Danish War of 1864, and in 1867 he was employed by Moltke on the army's general staff at Berlin. He served in the Franco-German War of 1870–71.

== Writings ==
His first literary attempt was a military work: Der Antagonismus Frankreichs und Englands vom politisch-militärischen Standpunkt (The antagonism between France and England from a political-military standpoint; Berlin, 1860). He was in his forties before he tried his hand at popular works, and first achieved notice with Peter Quidams Rheinfahrt (Peter Quidam's Rhine Journey; 1877). His numerous novels include:

- Hypochondrische Plaudereien (4th ed. 1875, new series; 3d ed. 1890)
- Randglossen zum Buch des Lebens (1876)
- Peter Quidams Rheinfahrt (Stuttgart, 1877)
- Der Zug des Todes (Elberfeld, 1878)
- Der neue Romanzero (2d ed. 1883)
- Eine moderne Abendgesellschaft, treating Jewish issues (3d ed. 1881)
- Gerke Suteminne (3d ed. 1890)
- Durch Nacht zum Licht (1887)
- Die Cis Moll Sonate (1891)

He wrote an autobiography, Skizzenbuch meines Lebens (Sketchbook of my life; Breslau, 1893–98, 2 vols.).
