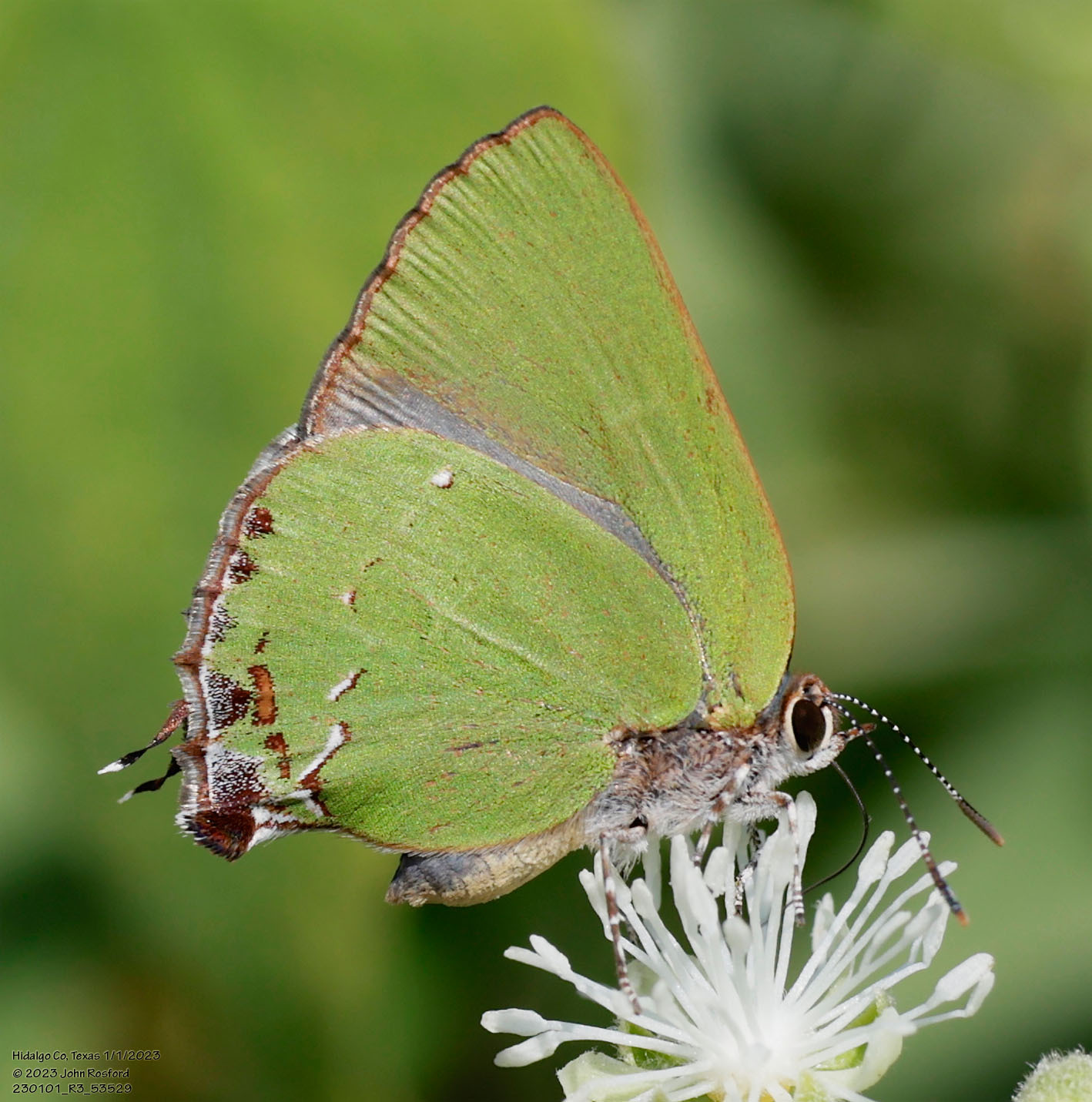

Scientific classification
- Kingdom: Animalia
- Phylum: Arthropoda
- Clade: Pancrustacea
- Class: Insecta
- Order: Lepidoptera
- Family: Lycaenidae
- Tribe: Eumaeini
- Genus: Cyanophrys
- Species: C. miserabilis

Binomial name
- Cyanophrys miserabilis (Clench, 1946)

= Cyanophrys miserabilis =

Species of butterfly

Cyanophrys miserabilis, known generally as the Clench's greenstreak or miserabilis hairstreak, is a species of hairstreak in the butterfly family Lycaenidae. It is found in North America.

The MONA or Hodges number for Cyanophrys miserabilis is 4308.
