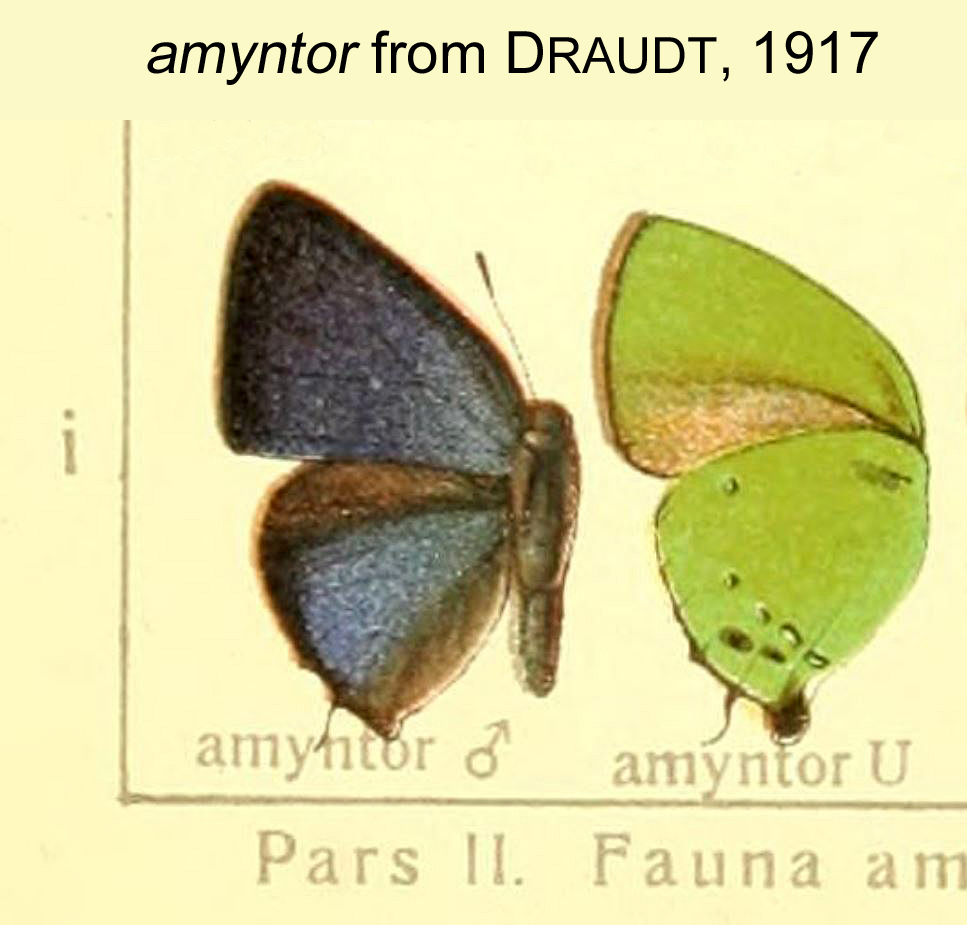

Scientific classification
- Domain: Eukaryota
- Kingdom: Animalia
- Phylum: Arthropoda
- Class: Insecta
- Order: Lepidoptera
- Family: Lycaenidae
- Genus: Cyanophrys
- Species: C. amyntor

Binomial name
- Cyanophrys amyntor (Cramer, 1775)

Synonyms
- Papilio amyntor Cramer, 1775; Papilio menalcas Cramer, 1779 (preocc. Poda, 1761); Thecla caramba Clench, 1944; Thecla amyntor distractus Clench, 1946; Cyanophrys eiselei D'Abrera, 1995; Cyanophrys quinterorum D'Abrera, 1995; Thecla amyntor

= Cyanophrys amyntor =

Species of butterfly

Cyanophrys amyntor, the Amyntor greenstreak, is a butterfly in the family Lycaenidae. It is found in the lowland tropics from Mexico to Brazil. It is known in the United States from a single specimen from the Big Bend region of western Texas. It has also been recorded from Hawaii.

The wingspan is 24–28 mm. Adults are on wing from July to January in Mexico.

The larvae feed on a wide range of plants, including species from the families Ulmaceae and Verbenaceae.
