= Dimnus =

Dimnus (Ancient Greek: Δίμνος) of Chalastra in Macedonia was hetairos of Alexander the Great. In autumn 330 BC, he formed a conspiracy to murder the king. Dimnus revealed to his eromenos Nicomachus the names of the conspirators (Demetrius, [Nicanor, lolaus, Dioxenus, Archepolis, Amyntas). But the plot was divulged by Cebalinus, who learned of the details from his brother, Nicomachus.
