= Agathon (son of Philotas) =

4th-century BC Macedonian noble

Agathon (in Greek Aγαθων; lived 4th century BC) was the son of the Macedonian Philotas and the brother of Parmenion and Asander. He was given as a hostage to Antigonus in 313 BC, by his brother Asander, who was satrap of Caria, but was taken back again by Asander in a few days. Agathon had a son, named Asander, who is mentioned in a Greek inscription.
