= Parmenion =

Macedonian general (c. 400 BC – 330 BC)

General Parmenion
- Παρμενίων
- Born: 400 BC
- Died: 330 BC (aged 69–70 years old); Ecbatana, Media, Macedonia
- Children: Philotas, Nikanor
- Relatives: Asander (brother), Agathon (brother), Attalus
- Military career
- Allegiance: Macedonia
- Service years: 356–330 BC
- Rank: General (strategos)
- Commands: Pezhetairos
- Conflicts: Expansion of Macedonia under Philip II; Philip's Illyrian Campaigns; Wars of Alexander the Great; Battle of the Granicus; Battle of Issus; Battle of Gaugamela

Parmenion (also Parmenio; Ancient Greek: Παρμενίων; c. 400 BC – 330 BC) was a Macedonian general in the service of Philip II of Macedon and Alexander the Great. A nobleman, Parmenion rose to become Philip's chief military lieutenant and Alexander's strategos (military general). He was assassinated after his son Philotas was convicted on a charge of treason. His siblings Asander and Agathon would also become prominent members of Alexander's Macedonia.

== Military service to Philip II ==
During the reign of Philip II, Parmenion achieved a great victory over the Illyrians in 356 BC. Ten years later, Parmenion destroyed the southern Thessalian town of Halos. He was one of the Macedonian delegates appointed to conclude peace with Athens in 346 BC, and was sent with an army to oversee Macedonian influence in Euboea in 342 BC.

In 336 BC, Philip II sent Parmenion, with Amyntas, Andromenes and Attalus, and an army of 10,000 men into Anatolia to make preparations to free the Greeks living on the western coast and islands from Persian rule. At first, all went well. The Greek cities on the western coast of Anatolia revolted until the news arrived that Philip had been murdered and had been succeeded by his young son Alexander. The Macedonians were demoralized by Philip's death and were subsequently defeated near Magnesia by the Persians under the command of the mercenary Memnon of Rhodes.

== Military service to Alexander ==
Although Alexander was recognized as king in Macedonia in October 336 BC, his accession was opposed by Attalus, a general in Parmenion's army. In response, Parmenion put the general to death even though Parmenion was father-in-law to Attalus. However, Parmenion recognised that this was a necessary act if Alexander's succession was to be smooth. As a consequence, Alexander was in Parmenion's debt particularly given that Parmenion was his most experienced general and commanded a large army.

As a result, a number of Parmenion's relatives were placed by Alexander in key positions in the Macedonian army. His youngest son Nikanor became commander of the infantry regiment known as the Shield bearers, his son-in-law Coenus commanded a phalanx battalion while another relative named Nicanor became admiral of the navy made up of Macedonia's fellow-Greek allies. Parmenion's friend Amyntas and his brother Asander were placed in key positions. Parmenion's oldest son Philotas was made commander of the Companion cavalry, a unit of 1,800 horsemen that was Macedonia's most effective weapon in its battles. Parmenion became Alexander's second in command, the same position he had held under Philip.

== Campaign against the Persian Empire ==
In 334 BC, Alexander joined Parmenion in Anatolia with reinforcements, thus starting Alexander's campaign against Persia. During the great battles that followed, Parmenion commanded the left wing while Alexander himself commanded the right wing.

Meanwhile, the Persian satraps of Cilicia, Lydia, Hellespontine Phrygia and other territories had assembled at Zelea, near Dascylium. The two armies met near the river Granicus. Most ancient sources agree that Parmenion advised Alexander not to attack and that it was Alexander's own idea to attack at once.

Parmenion is said to have acted as a foil to his commander's innovative strategies, by expertly formulating the orthodox strategy. For instance, according to Arrian's Anabasis of Alexander, at the Battle of Granicus, Parmenion suggested delay before the attack, as the army had already marched all day, always presenting the cautious path and often resulting in his being ignored by the King. Alexander attacked across the river regardless of this counsel and gained a victory nevertheless; however, Diodorus Siculus contradicts Arrian by stating clearly that Alexander accepted the advice. It is suggested that the Greeks were initially repulsed, and then stole a march on the Persians and crossed the river at night. This brought the Persian cavalry onto the field first against the Greeks the next morning, setting up a defeat in detail, as is reported in the accounts from that time. In any event, despite the Macedonians winning the overall battle, the near loss by Alexander during the battle may have tempered any youthful brashness on the part of Alexander, for he proceeded very cautiously the next six months or so as he liberated Greek cities in Asia Minor, and that muting of his aggressiveness is more in line with a near defeat.

After the battle, Parmenion captured the Persian stronghold Dascylium, the capital of Hellespontine Phrygia. Later, he seized Magnesia and Tralleis. His brother Asander was given responsibility for governing Lydia.

Meanwhile, Alexander liberated the Greek towns in Anatolia including Sardis, Ephesus, Miletus and Halicarnassus. During the winter of 334-333 BC, the king moved through Lycia. At the same time, Parmenion invaded central Anatolia from the west, driving out the remaining Persian troops and occupying the region. The two forces met each other in April 333 BC at Gordium, the capital of Phrygia. The united army then moved east to Cilicia where Parmenion captured the city of Tarsus.

Alexander planned to attack Darius in the plains of Sochi. However the Persian king with his large army had crossed the Amanus Mountains, captured Issus and then cut off the only Macedonian line of supply. The battle between the two forces took place south of Issus in November 333 BC. The Macedonians were victorious despite the Persian army being much larger, mainly because Parmenion had been able to counter the Persian attack. This gave Alexander a chance to launch a counter-attack.

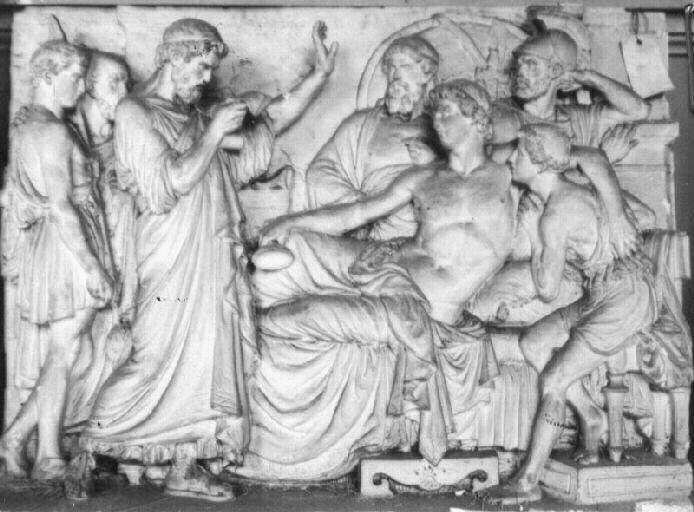
Alexander drinking while his doctor Philippe reads Parmenion's letter

It has been stated that Parmenion counselled a night attack in 331 BC on Darius' assembled superior forces at the Battle of Gaugamela, which Alexander took as evidence that Darius would keep his troops at the ready through the night and offer the Macedonians some advantage if they rested for a battle in daylight. During the battle, Parmenion led the Pezhetairos on the left flank which had been hurt by an opening made by Alexander's speedy advance with the cavalry. In Plutarch's Parallel Lives it is further suggested the escape of Darius was due to Parmenion's "sluggish and ineffectual" leadership, or even that he was jealous of Alexander's successes.

Parmenion would continue to be a significant influence and commander up until the conquest of Babylon. A steady hand commanding the left was critical in the overall Macedonian scheme and philosophy of battle, allowing the king to strike the decisive blow.

== Assassination ==
After the conquest of Drangiana, Alexander was informed that Philotas, son of Parmenion, was involved in a conspiracy against his life. Philotas was condemned by the army and put to death. Alexander, fearing the consequences if he were to allow the father to live, sent orders to Media for the assassination of Parmenion. There was no proof that Parmenion was in any way implicated in the conspiracy, but he was not afforded the opportunity to defend himself. A disaffected Parmenion would have been a serious threat, especially since he was commanding an army of his own, second in prestige only to Alexander, and was stationed near Alexander's treasury and on his supply lines. Also, as head of Philotas' family, Parmenion would have been held responsible for his actions, despite a lack of evidence connecting them to him. Alexander therefore acted swiftly and sent Cleander and Sitalces II on racing camels across the desert by the most direct route possible to assassinate Parmenion. Before the news reached Parmenion of Alexander's order, the two officers arrived and stabbed Parmenion to death.

His brother Asander would suffer in court for a short period following this but would later regain prominence in Alexander's empire.

== In fiction ==
Parmenion is the main character in David Gemmell's books Lion of Macedon and Dark Prince.

In the 1956 film Alexander the Great, directed by Robert Rossen, Parmenion was played by Irish actor Niall MacGinnis.

In the 1961 television version of Terence Rattigan's play Adventure Story, Parmenion is played by William Devlin.

In the 1999 film G2, Parmenion is portrayed as the Mongol rival to Alexander the Great's swordbearer, who reincarnates along with the latter in 2003 to resolve a millennia-spanning conflict.

In the 2004 film Alexander, directed by Oliver Stone, Parmenion (played by John Kavanagh) is depicted as a trusted but conservative commander and is slightly marginalized. The film depicts him as being assassinated by Cleitus the Black and Antigonus just after reading from their letter informing him of his son's execution (instead of by Cleander and Sitalces before he learns of it as is historically accurate).
