= Asander =

4th-century BC Macedonian general

Assander (Άσανδρoς)

Satrap of Lydia
- Reign: 323–321 BC
- Predecessor: Spithridates
- Successor: Cleitus the White

Satrap of Caria
- Reign: 321–313 BC
- Predecessor: Ada
- Successor: Pleistarchus
- Died: 313 BC (presumed)
- Father: Philotas

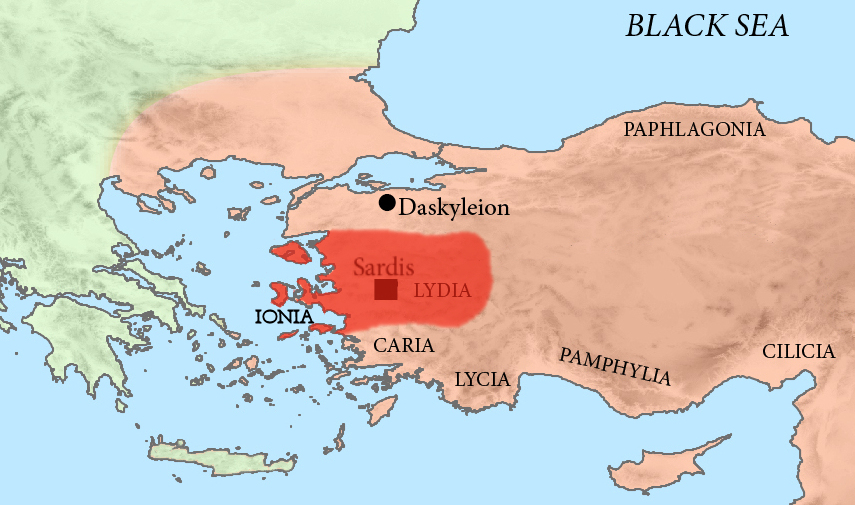
Asander was Hellenistic satrap of Lydia, and later Caria.

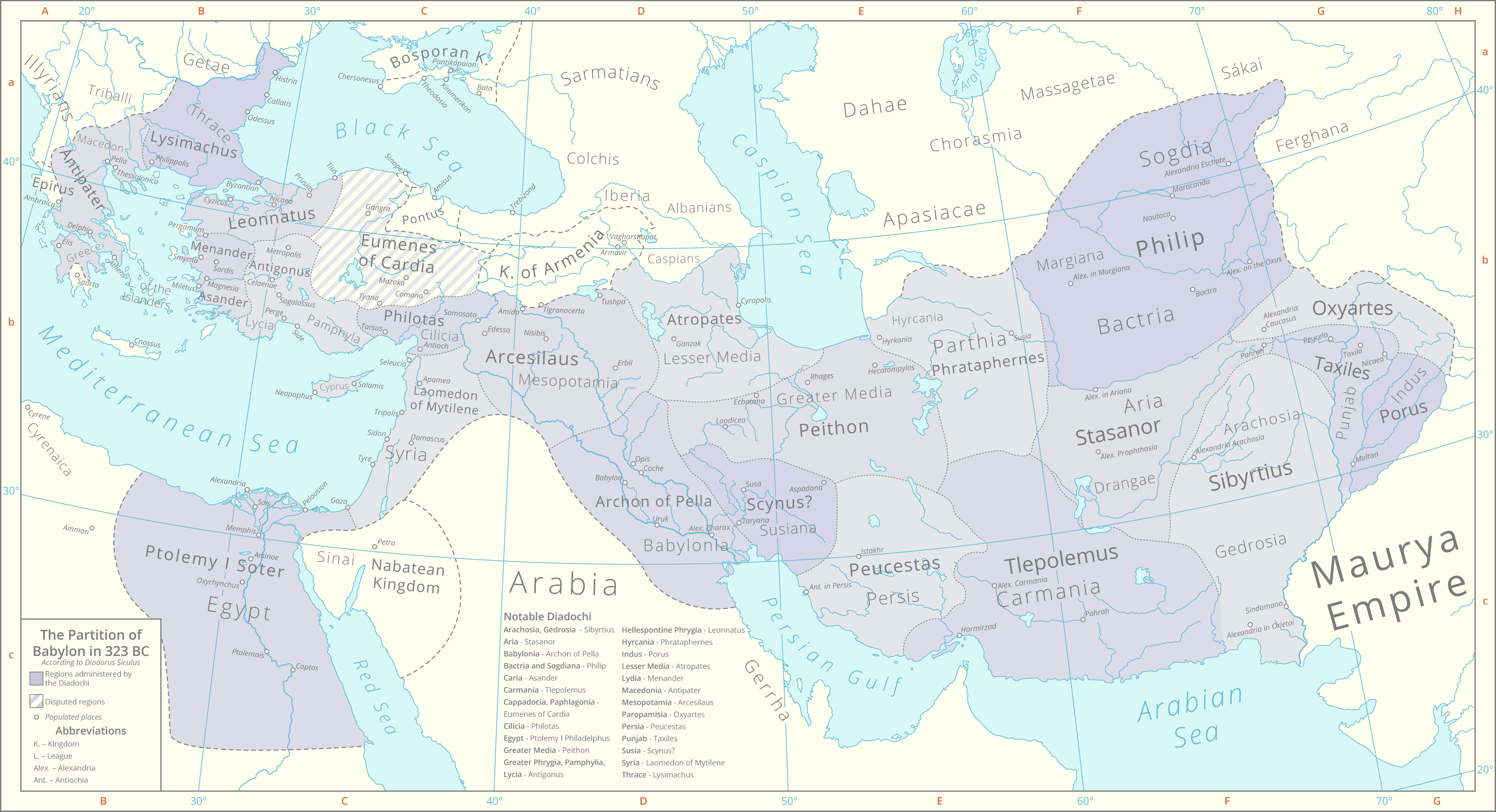
Allocation of satrapies at the Partition of Babylon, following Diodorus Siculus

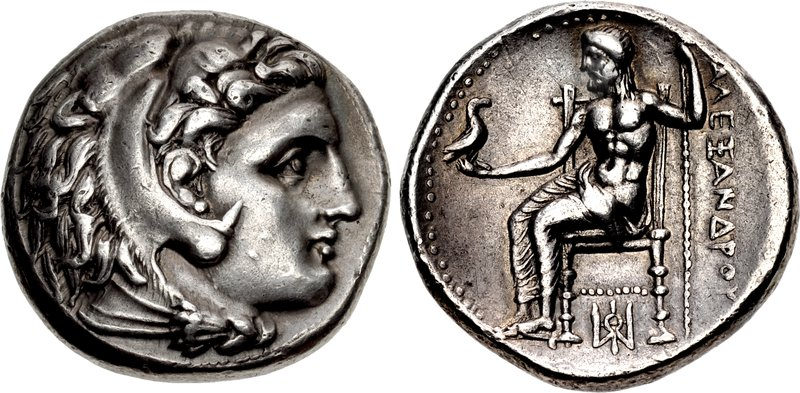
Coin of Philip III Arrhidaios, struck under Asandros as satrap of Caria in Miletus circa 323-319 BC, in the name and types of Alexander the Great.

Asander or Asandros (Greek: Άσανδρoς; lived 4th century BC) was the son of Philotas and brother of Parmenion and Agathon. He was a Macedonian general under Alexander the Great, and satrap of Lydia from 334 BC as well as satrap of Caria after Alexander's death. During Alexander's reign Asander's position suffered for a period following Parmenion's execution, he was sent to Media to gather reinforcements during this time, and a year later was sent to Bactra.

== Rule ==
=== Satrap of Lydia ===
In 334 BC Alexander appointed him governor of Lydia and the other parts of the satrapy of Spithridates, and also placed under his command an army of cavalry and light infantry strong enough to maintain the Macedonian authority. At the beginning of 328, Asander and Nearchus led a number of Greek mercenaries to join Alexander, who was then located at Zariaspa.

=== Satrap of Caria ===
In the division of the empire after the death of Alexander in 323, Asander obtained Caria for his satrapy, in which he was afterwards confirmed by Antipater. While acting as satrap of Caria he fought at the command of Antipater against Attalus and Alcetas, both supporters of Perdiccas, but was defeated by them. He also supported the Iranian colonists in Caria by increasing the position of local Zoroastrians.

In 317, while Antigonus was campaigning against Eumenes in Persia and Media, Asander increased his power in Asia Minor, expanding into Lycia and Cappadocia; and was undoubtedly a member of the alliance which was formed by Ptolemy, ruler of Egypt, and Cassander, ruler of Macedonia, against Antigonus. In 315, when Antigonus began his operations against the forces allied against him, he sent a general named Ptolemy, a nephew of his, with an army to relieve Amisus, and to expel from Cappadocia the army loyal to Asander which had invaded that country. However, as Asander was supported by Ptolemy and Cassander, he was able to maintain his control of his territories.

In 313 Antigonus decided to march against Asander and forced him to conclude a treaty with him under which he was required to surrender his whole army, to restore the areas he had expanded into back to the satraps who had previously controlled those areas, to regard his satrapy of Caria as subject to the gift of Antigonus, and to surrender his brother Agathon as a hostage. After a few days Asander breached this humiliating treaty. He managed to get his brother out of the hands of Antigonus and sent ambassadors to Ptolemy and Seleucus seeking their assistance. Antigonus was indignant at these acts and immediately sent out an army to restore the territories covered by the treaty by force of arms. Caria also appears to have been conquered and from this time Asander disappears from the historical record.

== Coinage ==
During his tenure in Caria, Asander minted several types of coins at Miletus, in the names of Alexander the Great and Philip III Arrhidaeus.

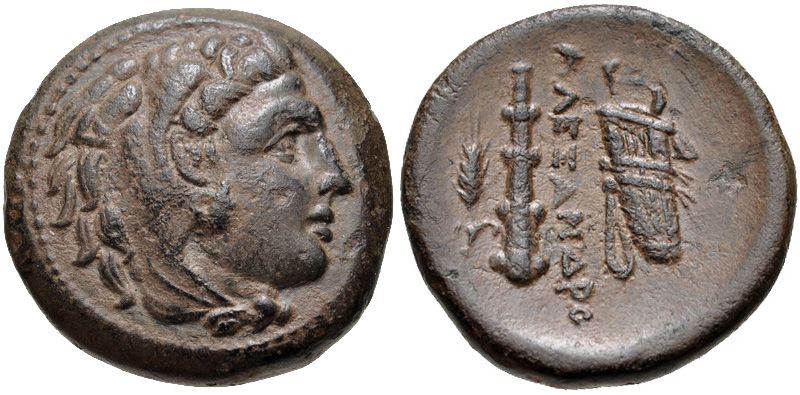
Coin of Philip III Arrhidaios, Miletos mint. Struck under Asandros, circa 323-319 BC, in the name and types of Alexander the Great.

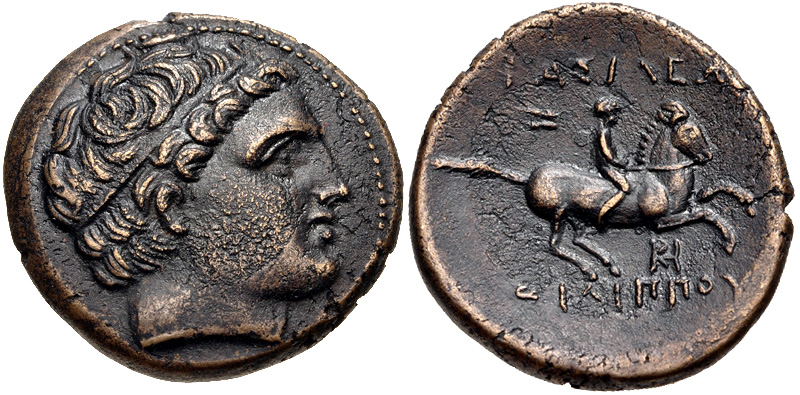
Coin of Philip III Arrhidaios, Miletos mint. Struck under Asandros, circa 323-319 BC

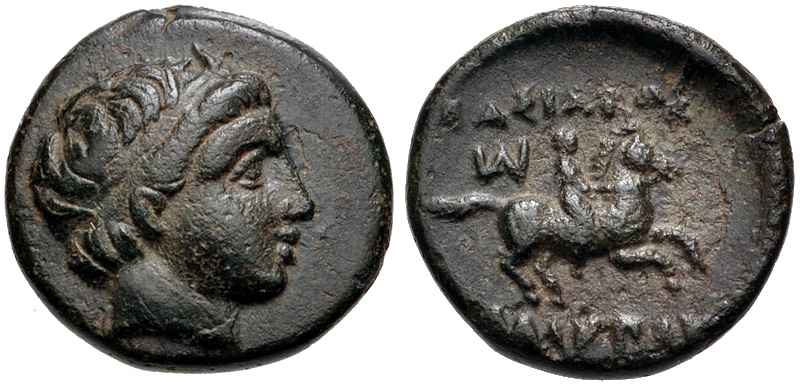
Coin of Philip III Arrhidaios, Miletos mint. Struck under Asandros, circa 323-319 BC

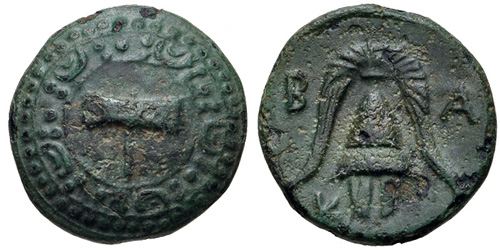
Coin of Philip III Arrhidaios, Miletos mint. Struck under Asandros, circa 323-319 BC
