= Terence Rattigan =

British playwright and screenwriter (1911–1977)

Sir Terence Rattigan CBE
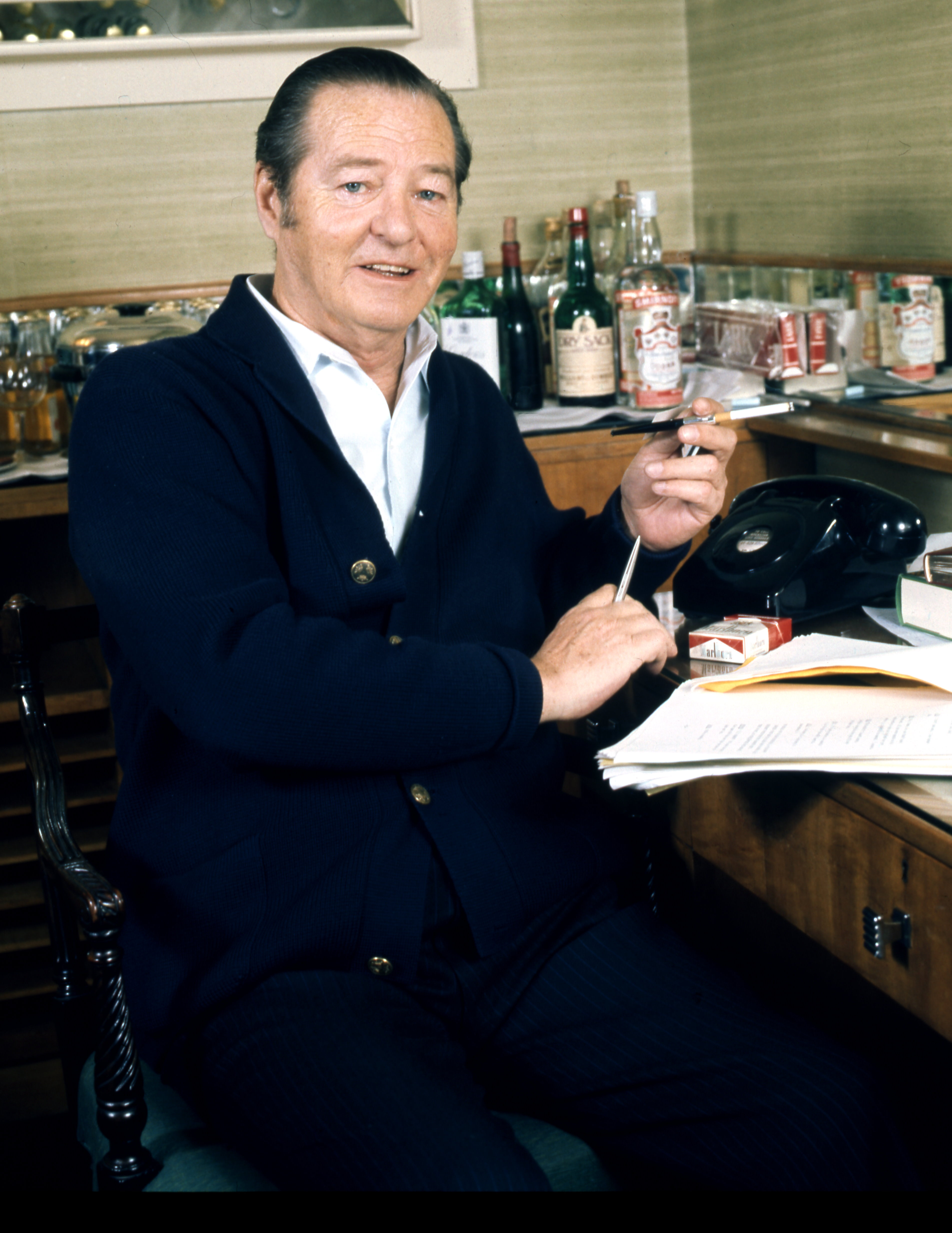
- Portrait of Rattigan by Allan Warren
- Born: 10 June 1911; South Kensington, London, England
- Died: 30 November 1977 (aged 66); Hamilton, Bermuda
- Other name: Terence Mervyn Rattigan
- Occupation: Playwright

Sir Terence Mervyn Rattigan (10 June 1911 – 30 November 1977) was a British dramatist and screenwriter. He was one of England's most popular mid-20th-century dramatists. His plays are typically set in an upper-middle-class background. He wrote The Winslow Boy (1946), The Browning Version (1948), The Deep Blue Sea (1952) and Separate Tables (1954), among many others.

A troubled gay man who saw himself as an outsider, Rattigan wrote a number of plays which centred on issues of sexual frustration, failed relationships, or a world of repression and reticence.

== Early life ==
Terence Rattigan was born in 1911 in South Kensington, London, of Irish extraction. He had an elder brother, Brian. They were the grandsons of Sir William Henry Rattigan, an India-based jurist and later a Liberal Unionist Member of Parliament for North-East Lanarkshire. His father was Frank Rattigan CMG, a diplomat whose exploits included an affair with Princess Elisabeth of Romania (future consort of King George II of Greece) which resulted in her having an abortion. The Royal House of Romania is considered to be the inspiration of Rattigan's play The Sleeping Prince.

Rattigan's birth certificate and his birth announcement in The Times indicate he was born on 9 June 1911. However, most reference books state that he was born the following day; Rattigan himself never publicly disputed this date. There is evidence suggesting that the date on the birth certificate is incorrect. He was given no middle name, but he adopted the middle name "Mervyn" in early adulthood.

== Education ==
Rattigan was educated at Sandroyd School from 1920 to 1925, at the time based in Cobham, Surrey (and now the home of Reed's School), and Harrow School. Rattigan played cricket for the Harrow First XI and scored 29 in the Eton–Harrow match in 1929. He was a member of the Harrow School Officer Training Corps and organised a mutiny, informing the Daily Express. Even more annoying to his headmaster, Cyril Norwood, was the telegram from the Eton OTC, "offering to march to his assistance". He then went to Trinity College, Oxford.

== Life and career ==
Success as a playwright came early, with the comedy French Without Tears in 1936, set in a crammer. This was inspired by a 1933 visit to a village called Marxzell in the Black Forest, where young English gentlemen went to learn German; his time briefly overlapped with his Harrow classmate Jock Colville.

Rattigan's determination to write a more serious play produced After the Dance (1939), a satirical social drama about the "bright young things" and their failure to politically engage. The outbreak of the Second World War scuppered any chances of a long run. Shortly before the war, Rattigan had written (together with Anthony Goldsmith) a satire about Nazi Germany, Follow My Leader; the Lord Chamberlain refused to license it on grounds of offence to a foreign country, but it was performed from January 1940.

During the war, Rattigan served in the Royal Air Force as a tail gunner; his experiences helped inspire Flare Path. In 1943 Rattigan, then an RAF flight lieutenant, was posted to the RAF Film Production Unit to work on The Way to the Stars (a substantial reworking and adaptation for film of Flare Path) and Journey Together.

After the war, Rattigan alternated between comedies and dramas, establishing himself as a major playwright: the most successful of which were The Winslow Boy (1946), The Browning Version (1948), The Deep Blue Sea (1952), and Separate Tables (1954).

Rattigan's belief in understated emotions and craftsmanship was deemed old fashioned and "pre-war" after the overnight success in 1956 of John Osborne's play Look Back in Anger began the era of kitchen sink dramas by the writers known as the Angry Young Men. Rattigan responded to this critical disfavour with some bitterness. His later plays—Ross, Man and Boy, In Praise of Love, and Cause Célèbre—although showing no sign of any decline in his talent, are less well-known than his earlier works. Rattigan explained that he wrote his plays to please a symbolic playgoer, "Aunt Edna", someone from the well-off middle-class who had conventional tastes; his critics frequently used this character as the basis for belittling him. "Aunt Edna" inspired Joe Orton to create "Edna Welthorpe", a mischievous alter ego stirring up controversy about his own plays.

Rattigan was gay, with numerous lovers but no long-term partners, a possible exception being his "congenial companion ... and occasional friend" Michael Franklin. From 1944 to January 1947 he enjoyed a volatile affair with the politician Henry "Chips" Channon who detailed the relationship in his diary published posthumously in 2022.

It has been claimed his work is essentially autobiographical, containing coded references to his sexuality, which was known by some in the theatrical world but not known to the public. There is some truth in this, but it risks being crudely reductive; for example, the repeated claim that Rattigan originally wrote The Deep Blue Sea as a play about male lovers, turned at the last minute into a heterosexual play, may be unfounded, though Rattigan said otherwise.

On the other hand, for the Broadway staging of Separate Tables, he wrote an alternative version of the newspaper article in which Major Pollock's indiscretions are revealed to his fellow hotel guests; in this version, those whom the Major approached for sex were men rather than young women. However, Rattigan changed his mind about staging it, and the original version proceeded.

Rattigan was fascinated with the life and character of T. E. Lawrence. In 1960, he wrote a play called Ross, based on Lawrence's exploits. Preparations were made to film it, and Dirk Bogarde accepted the role. However, it did not proceed because the Rank Organisation withdrew its support, not wishing to offend David Lean and Sam Spiegel, who had started to film Lawrence of Arabia. Bogarde called Rank's decision "my bitterest disappointment". Also in 1960, a musical version of French Without Tears was staged as Joie de Vivre, with music by Robert Stolz of White Horse Inn fame. It starred Donald Sinden, lasted only four performances, and has never been revived.

Rattigan was diagnosed with leukaemia in 1962 but seemingly recovered two years later. He fell ill again in 1968. He disliked the so-called "Swinging London" of the 1960s and moved abroad, living in Bermuda, where he lived off the proceeds from lucrative screenplays including The V.I.P.s and The Yellow Rolls-Royce. For a time he was the highest-paid screenwriter in the world.

In 1964, Rattigan wrote to the playwright Joe Orton congratulating the latter on his very dark comedy Entertaining Mr Sloane, to which Rattigan had escorted Vivien Leigh in its first week. He had invested £3,000 in getting the play transferred to the West End. Although an unlikely champion of the risqué Orton, Rattigan recognised the younger man's talent and approved of what he considered a well-written piece of theatre. He also acknowledged in retrospect that, "in a way, I was not Orton's best sponsor. I'm a very unfashionable figure still, and I was then wildly unfashionable critically. My sponsorship rather put critics off, I think."

Rattigan was knighted in the Queen's Birthday Honours of June 1971 for services to the theatre, being only the fourth playwright to be knighted in the 20th century (after Sir W. S. Gilbert in 1907, Sir Arthur Wing Pinero in 1909 and Sir Noël Coward in 1970). He had previously been appointed Commander of the Order of the British Empire (CBE), in June 1958. He moved back to Britain, where he experienced a minor revival in his reputation before his death.

== Death ==
Rattigan died in Hamilton, Bermuda, from bone cancer on 30 November 1977, aged 66. His cremated remains were deposited in the family vault at Kensal Green Cemetery.

== Legacy ==
In 1990, the British Library acquired Rattigan's papers consisting of 300 volumes of correspondence and papers relating to his prose and dramatic works.

There was a revival of The Deep Blue Sea in 1993, at the Almeida Theatre, London, directed by Karel Reisz and starring Penelope Wilton. A string of successful revivals followed, including The Winslow Boy at the Chichester Festival Theatre in 2001 (with David Rintoul, and subsequently on tour in 2002 with Edward Fox), Man and Boy at the Duchess Theatre, London, in 2005, with David Suchet as Gregor Antonescu, and In Praise of Love at Chichester, and Separate Tables at the Royal Exchange, Manchester, in 2006. His play on the last days of Lord Nelson, A Bequest to the Nation, was revived on Radio 3 for Trafalgar 200, starring Janet McTeer as Lady Hamilton, Kenneth Branagh as Nelson, and Amanda Root as Lady Nelson.

Thea Sharrock directed his rarely seen After the Dance in the summer of 2010 at London's Royal National Theatre. She directed a major new production of Rattigan's final and also rarely seen play Cause Célèbre at The Old Vic in March 2011 as part of The Terence Rattigan Centenary year celebrations. As well as this, Trevor Nunn marked the occasion with a West End revival of Flare Path at the Theatre Royal, Haymarket, between March and June 2011, starring Sienna Miller, James Purefoy and Sheridan Smith.

In 2011, the BBC presented The Rattigan Enigma by Benedict Cumberbatch, a documentary on Rattigan's life and career presented by actor Benedict Cumberbatch, who, like Rattigan, attended Harrow.

A new screen version of The Deep Blue Sea, directed by Terence Davies, was released in 2011, starring Rachel Weisz and Tom Hiddleston. In 2026, London's Royal National Theatre staged a revival of Man and Boy, directed by Anthony Lau and starring Ben Daniels and Laurie Kynaston.

== Stage plays ==
- 1934 First Episode
- 1935 A Tale of Two Cities (an adaptation of Charles Dickens's novel, written with John Gielgud; it was not produced onstage until 2013, but appeared in 1950 as a radio play)
- 1936 French Without Tears
- 1939 After the Dance
- 1940 Follow My Leader
- 1940 Grey Farm
- 1942 Flare Path
- 1943 While the Sun Shines
- 1944 Love In Idleness (rewriting of Less Than Kind; played in U.S. as O Mistress Mine)
- 1946 The Winslow Boy
- 1948 Harlequinade
- 1948 The Browning Version
- 1949 Adventure Story
- 1950 Who is Sylvia? (filmed as The Man Who Loved Redheads)
- 1952 The Deep Blue Sea
- 1953 The Sleeping Prince (filmed as The Prince and the Showgirl)
- 1954 Separate Tables
- 1958 Variation on a Theme
- 1960 Ross
- 1960 Joie de Vivre, a musical version of French Without Tears, with music by Robert Stolz and song lyrics by Paul Dehn
- 1963 Man and Boy
- 1970 A Bequest to the Nation
- 1973 In Praise of Love
- 1973 Before Dawn
- 1976 Duologue
- 1977 Cause Célèbre

== Television plays ==
- 1951 The Final Test (TV: 1951; film: 1953; radio: 1963)
- 1962 The Largest Theatre in the World: Heart to Heart
- 1964 Ninety Years On
- 1966 Nelson – A Portrait in Miniature
- 1968 All on Her Own
- 1972 High Summer

== Radio plays ==
Many of Rattigan's stage plays have been produced for radio by the BBC. The first play he wrote directly for radio was Cause Célèbre, broadcast on BBC Radio 4 on 27 October 1975, based on the 1935 murder of Francis Rattenbury.

== Film ==
=== Filmed plays ===
A number of Rattigan's plays have been filmed (he was the screenwriter or co-writer for all those made in his lifetime):

- French Without Tears (1940; Anatole de Grunwald and Ian Dalrymple were credited as screenwriters, although Rattigan also played a major role)
- While the Sun Shines (1947; with de Grunwald)
- The Winslow Boy (1948 and 1999)
- Adventure Story (BBC TV versions: 1950 and 1961)
- The Browning Version (film: 1951 and 1994; TV: 1955 and 1985)
- The Final Test (1953; based on his 1951 television play)
- The Man Who Loved Redheads (1954; based on Who Is Sylvia?)
- The Deep Blue Sea (1955 and 2011)
- The Prince and the Showgirl (1957; based on The Sleeping Prince)
- Separate Tables (1958; Rattigan and co-writer John Gay were nominated for an Academy Award for screenwriting; David Niven won the Best Actor Oscar and Wendy Hiller won Best Supporting Actress).
  - A 1970 BBC TV production directed by Alan Cooke. Geraldine McEwan (Sibyl/Anne); Eric Porter (Major Pollock/John Malcolm); Annette Crosbie (Miss Cooper); Robert Harris (Mr.Fowler); Hazel Hughes (Miss Meacham); Pauline Jameson (Mrs. Railton-Bell); Cathleen Nesbitt (Lady Matheson).
  - John Schlesinger directed a television film version in 1983 with Julie Christie and Alan Bates as the two couples, Claire Bloom as Miss Cooper and Irene Worth as Mrs Railton-Bell.
- A Bequest to the Nation (1973)
- Cause Célèbre (1987; TV)

=== Original screenplays ===
Terence Rattigan also wrote or co-wrote the following original screenplays:

- English Without Tears (1944; with Anatole de Grunwald; U.S. title Her Man Gilbey)
- Journey Together (1945)
- Bond Street (1948; uncredited; with de Grunwald and Rodney Ackland)
- The Sound Barrier (1952; U.S. title Breaking the Sound Barrier; Rattigan's first Academy Award nomination)
- The V.I.P.s (1963; Margaret Rutherford won a Best Supporting Actress Academy Award for her performance)
- The Yellow Rolls-Royce (1964)

=== Other screenwriting ===
Rattigan wrote or co-wrote the following screenplays from existing material by other writers:

- Gypsy (1937)
- Quiet Wedding (1940; with Anatole de Grunwald; based on the play by Esther McCracken)
- The Day Will Dawn (1942; with de Grunwald; U.S. title The Avengers; based on a treatment by Patrick Kirwan)
- Uncensored (1942; with Rodney Ackland; based on the book by Oscar Millard adapted by Wolfgang Wilhelm)
- The Way to the Stars (1945; from a story written by Rattigan, de Grunwald and Richard Sherman; U.S. title Johnny in the Clouds)
- Brighton Rock (1947; with Graham Greene, from Greene's novel)
- Goodbye, Mr. Chips (1969; based on the novel by James Hilton)
