= Classical Greece =

Period of ancient Greece (510 to 323 BC)

- Period: Ancient Greece
- Dates: c. 480–323 BC
- Preceded by: Archaic Greece
- Followed by: Hellenistic Greece; Hellenistic period

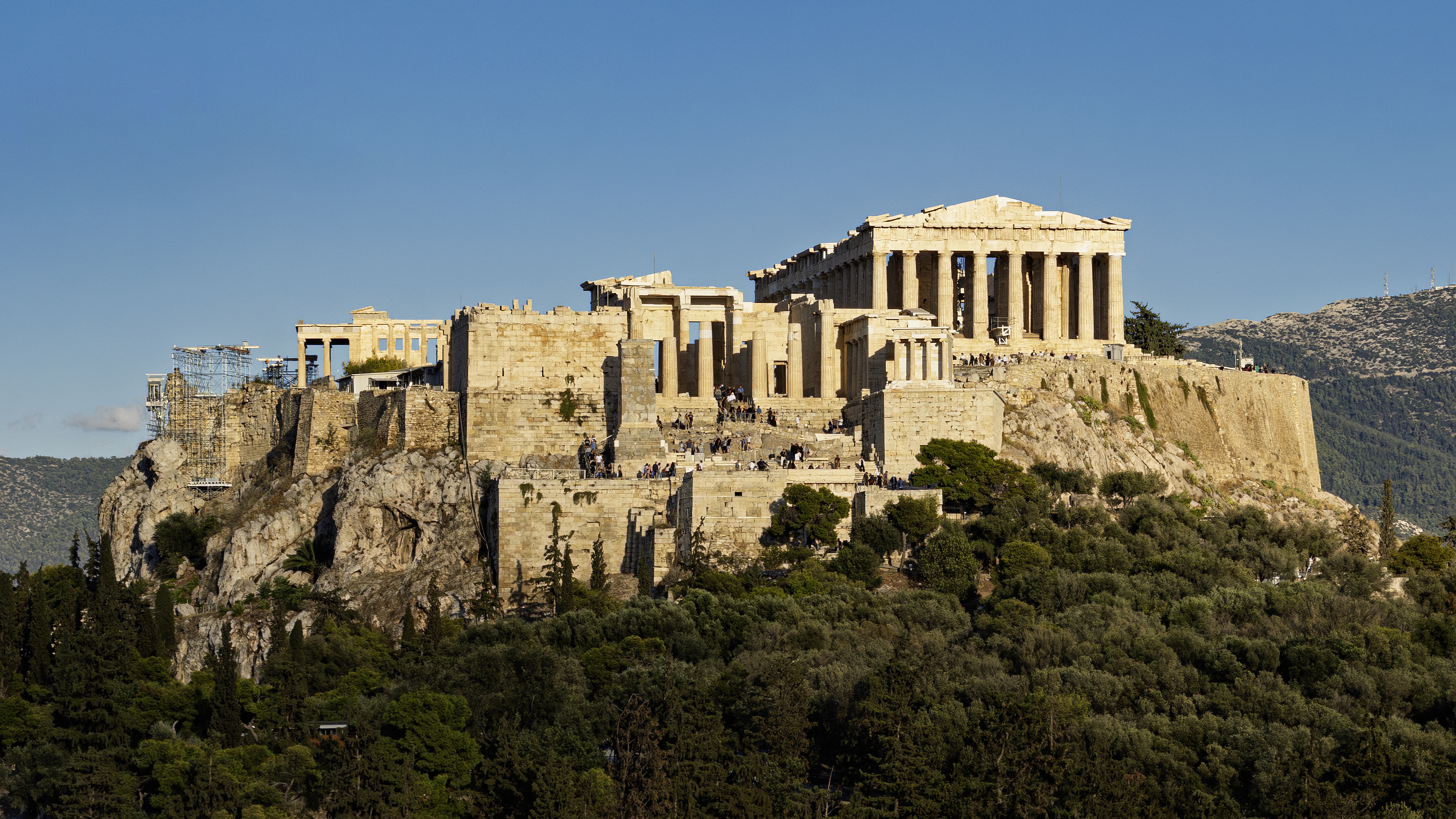
The Acropolis and Parthenon, in Athens, a temple to Athena

Classical Greece was a period of around 200 years (the 5th and 4th centuries BC) in Ancient Greece, marked by much of the eastern Aegean and northern regions of Greek culture (such as Ionia and Macedonia) gaining increased autonomy from the Persian Empire; the peak flourishing of democratic Athens; the First and Second Peloponnesian Wars; the Spartan and then Theban hegemonies; and the expansion of Macedonia under Philip II. Much of the early defining mathematics, science, artistic thought (architecture, sculpture), theatre, literature, philosophy, and politics of Western civilization derive from this period of Greek history, which had a powerful influence on the later Roman Empire. Part of the broader era of classical antiquity, the classical Greek era ended after Philip II's unification of most of the Greek world against the common enemy of the Persian Empire, which was conquered within 13 years during the wars of Alexander the Great, Philip's son.

In the context of the art, architecture, and culture of ancient Greece, the Classical period corresponds to most of the 5th and 4th centuries BC (the most common dates being the fall of the last Athenian tyrant in 510 BC to the death of Alexander the Great in 323 BC). The Classical period in this sense follows the Greek Dark Ages and Archaic period and is in turn succeeded by the Hellenistic period.

== 5th century BC ==
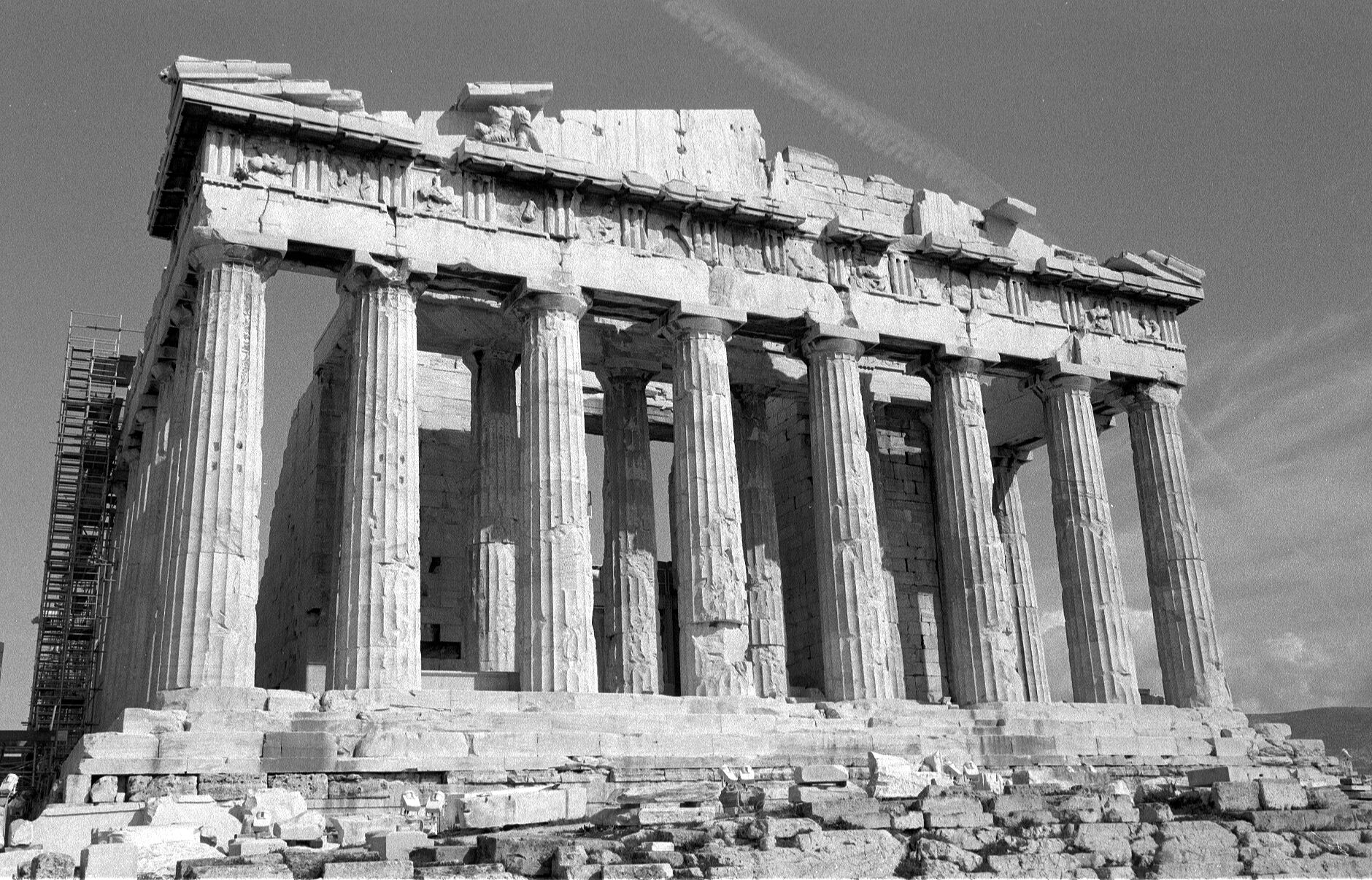
Construction of the Parthenon began in the 5th century BC

This century is essentially studied from the Athenian outlook because Athens has left us more narratives, plays, and other written works than any of the other ancient Greek states. From the perspective of Athenian culture in classical Greece, the period generally referred to as the 5th century BC extends slightly into the 6th century BC. In this context, one might consider that the first significant event of this century occurs in 508 BC, with the fall of the last Athenian tyrant and Cleisthenes' reforms. However, a broader view of the whole Greek world might place its beginning at the Ionian Revolt of 500 BC, the event that provoked the Persian invasion of 492 BC. The Persians were defeated in 490 BC. A second Persian attempt, in 481–479 BC, failed as well, despite having overrun much of modern-day Greece (north of the Isthmus of Corinth) at a crucial point during the war following the Battle of Thermopylae and the Battle of Artemisium. The Delian League then formed, under Athenian hegemony and as Athens' instrument. Athens' successes caused several revolts among the allied cities, all of which were put down by force, but Athenian dynamism finally awoke Sparta and brought about the Peloponnesian War in 431 BC. After both sides were exhausted, a brief peace followed; then the war resumed in Sparta's favor. Athens was decisively defeated in 404 BC, and internal unrest marked the end of the 5th century BC in Greece.

Since its beginning, Sparta had been ruled by a diarchy. This meant that Sparta had two kings ruling concurrently throughout its entire history. The two kingships were both hereditary, vested in the Agiad dynasty and the Eurypontid dynasty. According to legend, the respective hereditary lines of these two dynasties sprang from Eurysthenes and Procles, twin descendants of Hercules. They were said to have conquered Sparta two generations after the Trojan War.

=== Athens under Cleisthenes ===
In 510 BC, Spartan troops helped the Athenians overthrow their king, the tyrant Hippias, son of Peisistratos. Cleomenes I, king of Sparta, put in place a pro-Spartan oligarchy headed by Isagoras. But his rival Cleisthenes, with the support of the middle class and aided by pro-democracy citizens, took over. Cleomenes intervened in 508 and 506 BC, but could not stop Cleisthenes, now supported by the Athenians. Through Cleisthenes' reforms, the people endowed their city with isonomic institutions—equal rights for all citizens (though only men were citizens)—and established ostracism.

The isonomic and isegoric (equal freedom of speech) democracy was first organized into about 130 demes, which became the basic civic element. The 10,000 citizens exercised their power as members of the assembly (ἐκκλησία, ekklesia), headed by a council of 500 citizens chosen at random.

The city's administrative geography was reworked, in order to create mixed political groups: not federated by local interests linked to the sea, to the city, or to farming, whose decisions (e.g. a declaration of war) would depend on their geographical position. The territory of the city was also divided into thirty trittyes as follows:

- ten trittyes in the coastal region (παρᾰλία, paralia)
- ten trittyes in the ἄστυ (astu), the urban centre
- ten trittyes in the rural interior, (μεσογεία, mesogia).

A tribe consisted of three trittyes, selected at random, one from each of the three groups. Each tribe therefore always acted in the interest of all three sectors.

It was this corpus of reforms that allowed the emergence of a wider democracy in the 460s and 450s BC.

=== The Persian Wars ===
In Ionia (the modern Aegean coast of Turkey), the Greek cities, which included great centres such as Miletus and Halicarnassus, were unable to maintain their independence and came under the rule of the Persian Empire in the mid-6th century BC. In 499 BC that region's Greeks rose in the Ionian Revolt, and Athens and some other Greek cities sent aid, but were quickly forced to back down after defeat in 494 BC at the Battle of Lade. Asia Minor returned to Persian control.

In 492 BC, the Persian general Mardonius led a campaign through Thrace and Macedonia. He was victorious and again subjugated the former and conquered the latter, but he was wounded and forced to retreat back into Asia Minor. In addition, a fleet of around 1,200 ships that accompanied Mardonius on the expedition was wrecked by a storm off the coast of Mount Athos. Later, the generals Artaphernes and Datis led a successful naval expedition against the Aegean islands.

In 490 BC, Darius the Great, having suppressed the Ionian cities, sent a Persian fleet to punish the Greeks. (Historians are uncertain about their number of men; accounts vary from 18,000 to 100,000.) They landed in Attica intending to take Athens, but were defeated at the Battle of Marathon by a Greek army of 9,000 Athenian hoplites and 1,000 Plataeans led by the Athenian general Miltiades. The Persian fleet continued to Athens but, seeing it garrisoned, decided not to attempt an assault.

In 480 BC, Darius' successor Xerxes I sent a much more powerful force of 300,000 by land, with 1,207 ships in support, across a double pontoon bridge over the Hellespont. This army took Thrace, before descending on Thessaly and Boeotia, whilst the Persian navy skirted the coast and resupplied the ground troops. The Greek fleet, meanwhile, dashed to block Cape Artemision. After being delayed by Leonidas I, the Spartan king of the Agiad Dynasty, at the Battle of Thermopylae (a battle made famous by the 300 Spartans who faced the entire Persian army), Xerxes advanced into Attica, and captured and burned Athens. The subsequent Battle of Artemisium resulted in the capture of Euboea, bringing most of mainland Greece north of the Isthmus of Corinth under Persian control. However, the Athenians had evacuated the city of Athens by sea before Thermopylae, and under the command of Themistocles, they defeated the Persian fleet at the Battle of Salamis, where the smaller Greek navy exploited the narrow straits to neutralize the Persians' numerical advantage and inflict a decisive blow.

Map of the first phases of the Greco-Persian Wars (500–479 BC)

In 483 BC, during the period of peace between the two Persian invasions, a vein of silver ore had been discovered in the Laurion (a small mountain range near Athens), and the hundreds of talents mined there were used to build 200 warships to combat Aeginetan piracy. A year later, the Greeks, under the Spartan Pausanias, defeated the Persian army at Plataea. The Persians then began to withdraw from Greece, and never attempted an invasion again.

The Athenian fleet then turned to chasing the Persians from the Aegean Sea, defeating their fleet decisively in the Battle of Mycale; then in 478 BC the fleet captured Byzantium. At that time Athens enrolled all the island states and some mainland ones into an alliance called the Delian League, so named because its treasury was kept on the sacred island of Delos. The Spartans, although they had taken part in the war, withdrew into isolation afterwards, allowing Athens to establish unchallenged naval and commercial power.

=== The Peloponnesian War ===
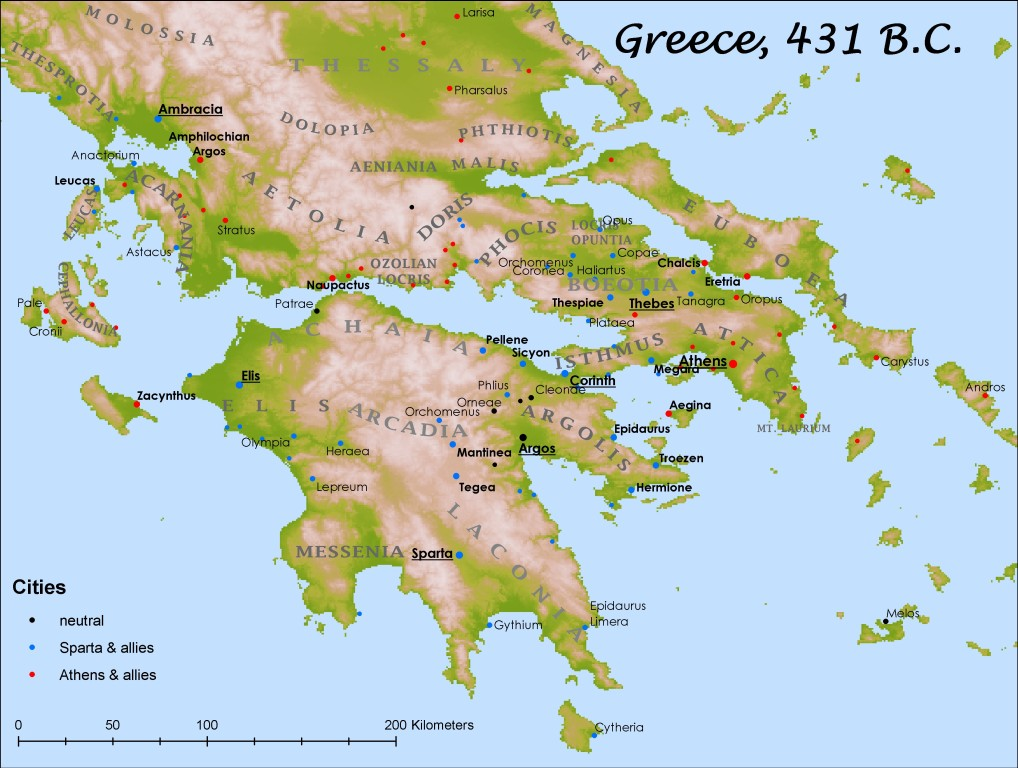
Cities at the beginning of the Peloponnesian War

==== Origins of the Delian League and the Peloponnesian League ====
In 431 BC war broke out between Athens and Sparta. The war was a struggle not merely between two city-states but rather between two coalitions, or leagues of city-states: the Delian League, led by Athens, and the Peloponnesian League, led by Sparta.

==== Delian league ====
The Delian League grew out of the need to present a unified front of all Greek city-states against Persian aggression. In 481 BC, Greek city-states, including Sparta, met in the first of a series of "congresses" that strove to unify all the Greek city-states against the danger of another Persian invasion. The coalition that emerged from the first congress was named the "Hellenic League" and included Sparta. Persia, under Xerxes, invaded Greece in September 481 BC, but the Athenian navy defeated the Persian navy. The Persian land forces were delayed in 480 BC by a much smaller force of 300 Spartans, 400 Thebans and 700 men from Boeotian Thespiae at the Battle of Thermopylae. The Persians left Greece in 479 BC after their defeat at Plataea.

Plataea was the final battle of Xerxes' invasion of Greece. After this, the Persians never again tried to invade Greece. With the disappearance of this external threat, cracks appeared in the united front of the Hellenic League. In 477, Athens became the recognised leader of a coalition of city-states that did not include Sparta. This coalition met and formalized their relationship at the holy city of Delos. Thus, the League took the name "Delian League". Its formal purpose was to liberate Greek cities still under Persian control. However, it became increasingly apparent that the Delian League was really a front for Athenian hegemony throughout the Aegean.

==== Peloponnesian (or Spartan) league ====
A competing coalition of Greek city-states centred around Sparta arose, and became more important as the external Persian threat subsided. This coalition is known as the Peloponnesian League. However, unlike the Hellenic League and the Delian League, this league was not a response to any external threat, Persian or otherwise: it was unabashedly an instrument of Spartan policy aimed at Sparta's security and Spartan dominance over the Peloponnese peninsula. The term "Peloponnesian League" is a misnomer. It was not really a "league" at all. Nor was it really "Peloponnesian". There was no equality at all between the members, as might be implied by the term "league". Furthermore, most of its members were located outside the Peloponnese Peninsula. The terms "Spartan League" and "Peloponnesian League" are modern terms. Contemporaries instead referred to "Lacedaemonians and their Allies" to describe the "league".

The league had its origins in Sparta's conflict with Argos, another city on the Peloponnese Peninsula. In the 7th century BC Argos dominated the peninsula. Even in the early 6th century the Argives attempted to control the northeastern part of the peninsula. The rise of Sparta in the 6th century brought Sparta into conflict with Argos. However, with the conquest of the Peloponnesian city-state of Tegea in 550 BC and the defeat of the Argives in 546 BC the Spartans' control began to reach well beyond the borders of Laconia.

=== The thirty years peace ===
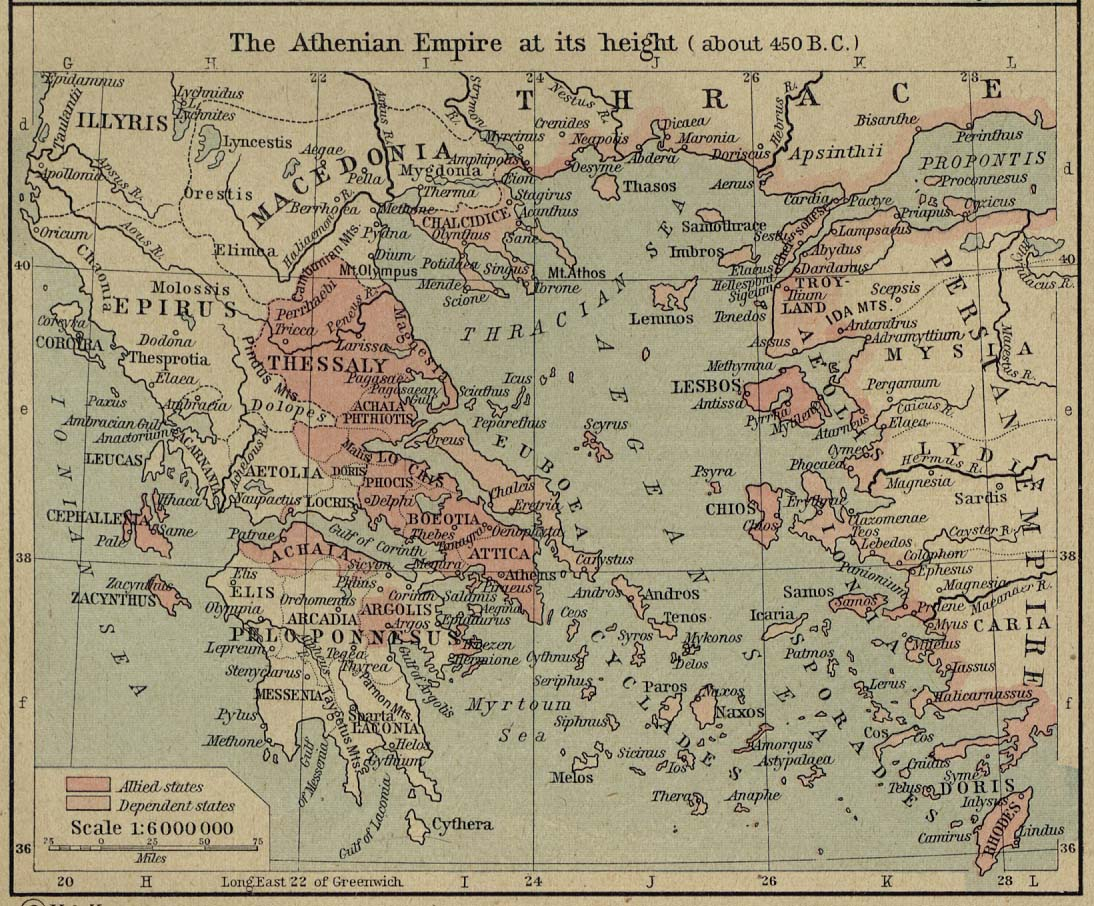
Athenian empire.

As the two coalitions grew, their separate interests kept coming into conflict. Under the influence of King Archidamus II (the Eurypontid king of Sparta from 476 BC through 427 BC), Sparta, in the late summer or early autumn of 446 BC, concluded the Thirty Years Peace with Athens. This treaty took effect the next winter in 445 BC Under the terms of this treaty, Greece was formally divided into two large power zones. Sparta and Athens agreed to stay within their own power zone and not to interfere in the other's. Despite the Thirty Years Peace, it was clear that war was inevitable. As noted above, at all times during its history down to 221 BC, Sparta was a "diarchy" with two kings ruling the city-state concurrently. One line of hereditary kings was from the Eurypontid Dynasty while the other king was from the Agiad Dynasty. With the signing of the Thirty Years Peace treaty, Archidamus II felt he had successfully prevented Sparta from entering into a war with its neighbours. However, the strong war party in Sparta soon won out and in 431 BC Archidamus was forced to go to war with the Delian League. However, in 427 BC, Archidamus II died and his son, Agis II succeeded to the Eurypontid throne of Sparta.

=== Causes of the Peloponnesian war ===
The immediate causes of the Peloponnesian War vary from account to account. However three causes are fairly consistent among the ancient historians, namely Thucydides and Plutarch. Prior to the war, Corinth and one of its colonies, Corcyra (modern-day Corfu), went to war in 435 BC over the new Corcyran colony of Epidamnus. Sparta refused to become involved in the conflict and urged an arbitrated settlement of the struggle. In 433 BC, Corcyra sought Athenian assistance in the war. Corinth was known to be a traditional enemy of Athens. However, to further encourage Athens to enter the conflict, Corcyra pointed out how useful a friendly relationship with Corcyra would be, given the strategic locations of Corcyra itself and the colony of Epidamnus on the east shore of the Adriatic Sea. Furthermore, Corcyra promised that Athens would have the use of Corcyra's navy, the third-largest in Greece. This was too good an offer for Athens to refuse. Accordingly, Athens signed a defensive alliance with Corcyra.

The next year, in 432 BC, Corinth and Athens argued over control of Potidaea (near modern-day Nea Potidaia), eventually leading to an Athenian siege of Potidaea. In 434–433 BC Athens issued the "Megarian Decrees", a series of decrees that placed economic sanctions on the Megarian people. The Peloponnesian League accused Athens of violating the Thirty Years Peace through all of the aforementioned actions, and, accordingly, Sparta formally declared war on Athens.

Many historians consider these to be merely the immediate causes of the war. They would argue that the underlying cause was the growing resentment on the part of Sparta and its allies at the dominance of Athens over Greek affairs. The war lasted 27 years, partly because Athens (a naval power) and Sparta (a land-based military power) found it difficult to come to grips with each other.

=== The Peloponnesian war: Opening stages (431–421 BC) ===
Sparta's initial strategy was to invade Attica, but the Athenians were able to retreat behind their walls. An outbreak of plague in the city during the siege caused many deaths, including that of Pericles. At the same time the Athenian fleet landed troops in the Peloponnesus, winning battles at Naupactus (429) and Pylos (425). However, these tactics could bring neither side a decisive victory. After several years of inconclusive campaigning, the moderate Athenian leader Nicias concluded the Peace of Nicias (421).

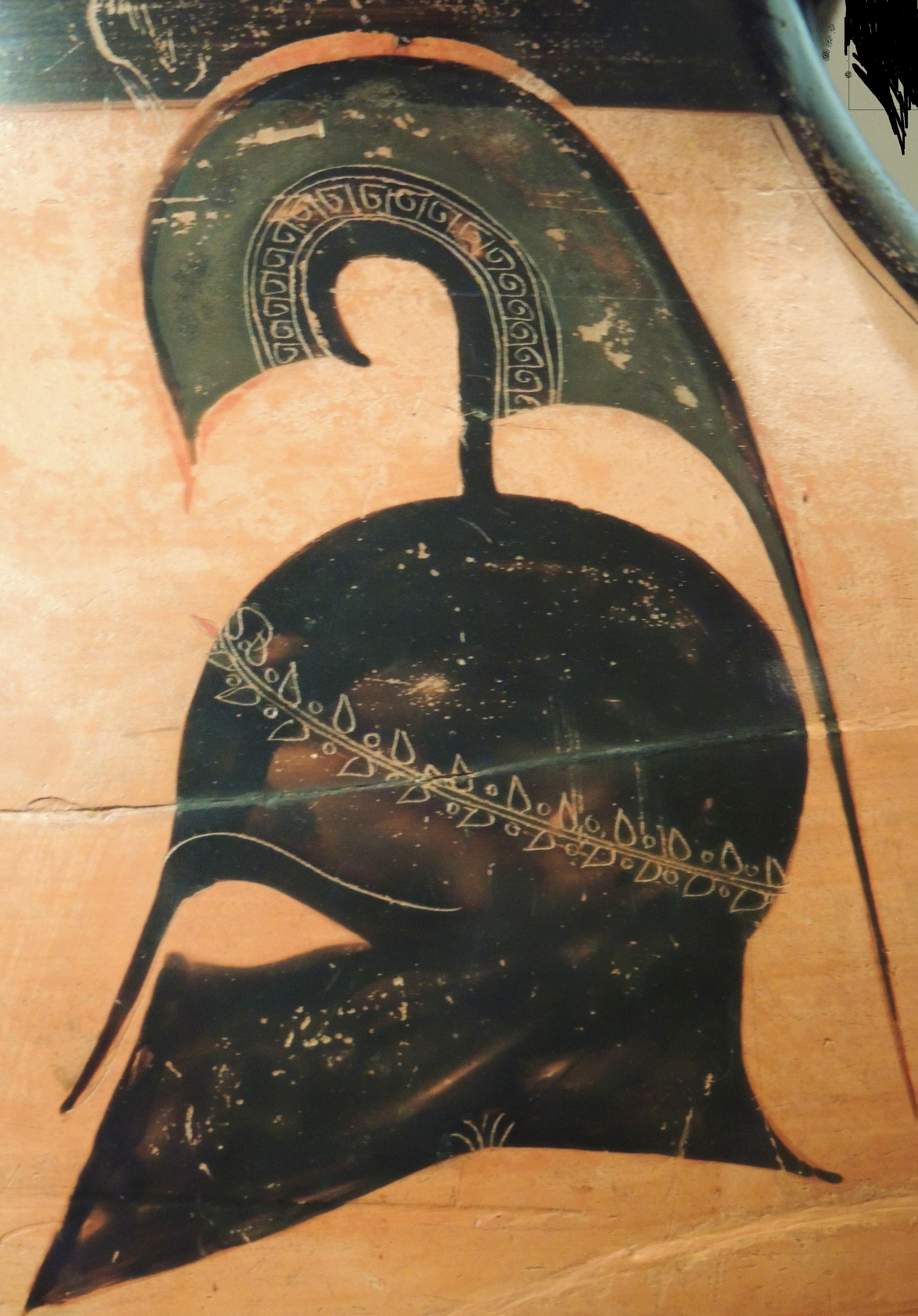
A soldier's helmet on black-figure pottery

=== The Peloponnesian war: Second phase (418–404 BC) ===
In 418 BC, however, conflict between Sparta and the Athenian ally Argos led to a resumption of hostilities. Alcibiades was one of the most influential voices in persuading the Athenians to ally with Argos against the Spartans. At the Mantinea Sparta defeated the combined armies of Athens and her allies. Accordingly, Argos and the rest of the Peloponnesus was brought back under the control of Sparta. The return of peace allowed Athens to be diverted from meddling in the affairs of the Peloponnesus and to concentrate on building up the empire and putting their finances in order. Soon trade recovered and tribute began, once again, rolling into Athens. A strong "peace party" arose, which promoted avoidance of war and continued concentration on the economic growth of the Athenian Empire. Concentration on the Athenian Empire, however, brought Athens into conflict with another Greek state.

==== The Melian expedition (416 BC) ====
Ever since the formation of the Delian League in 477 BC, the island of Melos had refused to join. By refusing to join the League, however, Melos reaped the benefits of the League without bearing any of the burdens. In 425 BC, an Athenian army under Cleon attacked Melos to force the island to join the Delian League. However, Melos fought off the attack and was able to maintain its neutrality. Further conflict was inevitable and in the spring of 416 BC the mood of the people in Athens was inclined toward military adventure. The island of Melos provided an outlet for this energy and frustration for the military party. Furthermore, there appeared to be no real opposition to this military expedition from the peace party. Enforcement of the economic obligations of the Delian League upon rebellious city-states and islands was a means by which continuing trade and prosperity of Athens could be assured. Melos alone among all the Cycladic Islands located in the south-west Aegean Sea had resisted joining the Delian League. This continued rebellion provided a bad example to the rest of the members of the Delian League.

The debate between Athens and Melos over the issue of joining the Delian League is presented by Thucydides in his Melian Dialogue. The debate did not in the end resolve any of the differences between Melos and Athens and Melos was invaded in 416 BC, and soon occupied by Athens. This success on the part of Athens whetted the appetite of the people of Athens for further expansion of the Athenian Empire. Accordingly, the people of Athens were ready for military action and tended to support the military party, led by Alcibiades.

==== The Sicilian expedition (415–413 BC) ====
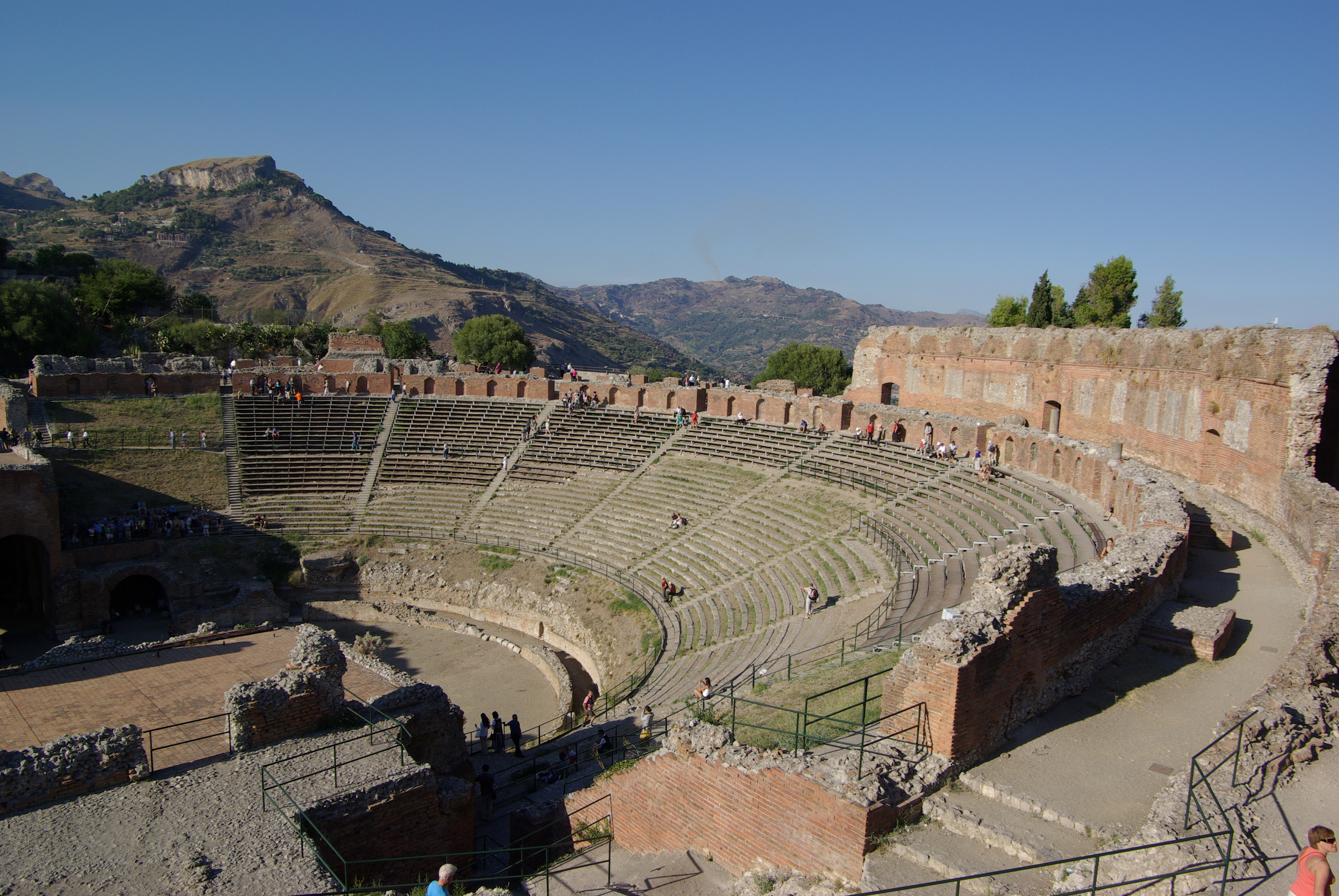
Greek Theater of Taormina, Sicily, Magna Graecia

Thus, in 415 BC, Alcibiades found support within the Athenian Assembly for his position when he urged that Athens launch a major expedition against Syracuse, a Peloponnesian ally in Sicily, Magna Graecia. Segesta, a town in Sicily, had requested Athenian assistance in their war with another Sicilian town—the town of Selinus. Although Nicias was a sceptic about the Sicilian Expedition, he was appointed along with Alcibiades to lead the expedition.

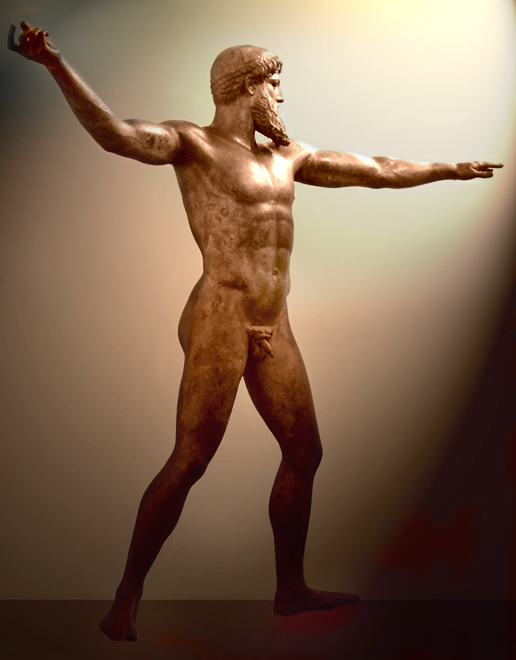
Artemision Bronze, thought to be either Poseidon or Zeus, c. 460 BC, National Archaeological Museum, Athens. Found by fishermen off the coast of Cape Artemisium in 1928. The figure is more than 2 m in height.

However, unlike the expedition against Melos, the citizens of Athens were deeply divided over Alcibiades' proposal for an expedition to far-off Sicily. In June 415 BC, on the very eve of the departure of the Athenian fleet for Sicily, a band of vandals in Athens defaced the many statues of the god Hermes that were scattered throughout the city of Athens. This action was blamed on Alcibiades and was seen as a bad omen for the coming campaign. In all likelihood, the coordinated action against the statues of Hermes was the action of the peace party. Having lost the debate on the issue, the peace party was desperate to weaken Alcibiades' hold on the people of Athens. Successfully blaming Alcibiades for the action of the vandals would have weakened Alcibiades and the war party in Athens. Furthermore, it is unlikely that Alcibiades would have deliberately defaced the statues of Hermes on the very eve of his departure with the fleet. Such defacement could only have been interpreted as a bad omen for the expedition that he had long advocated.

Even before the fleet reached Sicily, word arrived to the fleet that Alcibiades was to be arrested and charged with sacrilege of the statues of Hermes, prompting Alcibiades to flee to Sparta. When the fleet later landed in Sicily and the battle was joined, the expedition was a complete disaster. The entire expeditionary force was lost and Nicias was captured and executed. This was one of the most crushing defeats in the history of Athens.

==== Alcibiades in Sparta ====
Meanwhile, Alcibiades betrayed Athens and became a chief advisor to the Spartans and began to counsel them on the best way to defeat his native land. Alcibiades persuaded the Spartans to begin building a real navy for the first time—large enough to challenge the Athenian superiority at sea. Additionally, Alcibiades persuaded the Spartans to ally themselves with their traditional foes—the Persians. As noted below, Alcibiades soon found himself in controversy in Sparta when he was accused of having seduced Timaea, the wife of Agis II, the Eurypontid king of Sparta. Accordingly, Alcibiades was required to flee from Sparta and seek the protection of the Persian Court.

==== Persia intervenes ====
In the Persian court, Alcibiades now betrayed both Athens and Sparta. He encouraged Persia to give Sparta financial aid to build a navy, advising that long and continuous warfare between Sparta and Athens would weaken both city-states and allow the Persians to dominate the Greek peninsula.

Among the war party in Athens, a belief arose that the catastrophic defeat of the military expedition to Sicily in 415–413 could have been avoided if Alcibiades had been allowed to lead the expedition. Thus, despite his treacherous flight to Sparta and his collaboration with Sparta and later with the Persian court, there arose a demand among the war party that Alcibiades be allowed to return to Athens without being arrested. Alcibiades negotiated with his supporters on the Athenian-controlled island of Samos. Alcibiades felt that "radical democracy" was his worst enemy. Accordingly, he asked his supporters to initiate a coup to establish an oligarchy in Athens. If the coup were successful Alcibiades promised to return to Athens. In 411, a successful oligarchic coup was mounted in Athens, by a group which became known as "the 400". However, a parallel attempt by the 400 to overthrow democracy in Samos failed. Alcibiades was immediately made an admiral (navarch) in the Athenian navy. Later, due to democratic pressures, the 400 were replaced by a broader oligarchy called "the 5000". Alcibiades did not immediately return to Athens. In early 410, Alcibiades led an Athenian fleet of 18 triremes against the Persian-financed Spartan fleet at Abydos near the Hellespont. The Battle of Abydos had actually begun before the arrival of Alcibiades, and had been inclining slightly toward the Athenians. However, with the arrival of Alcibiades, the Athenian victory over the Spartans became a rout. Only the approach of nightfall and the movement of Persian troops to the coast where the Spartans had beached their ships saved the Spartan navy from total destruction.

Following Alcibiades' advice, the Persian Empire had been playing Sparta and Athens off against each other. However, as weak as the Spartan navy was after the Battle of Abydos, the Persian navy directly assisted the Spartans. Alcibiades then pursued and met the combined Spartan and Persian fleets at the Battle of Cyzicus later in the spring of 410, achieving a significant victory.

==== Lysander and the end of the war ====
With the financial help of the Persians, Sparta built a fleet to challenge Athenian naval supremacy. With the new fleet and new military leader Lysander, Sparta attacked Abydos, seizing the strategic initiative. By occupying the Hellespont, the source of Athens' grain imports, Sparta effectively threatened Athens with starvation. In response, Athens sent its last remaining fleet to confront Lysander, but were decisively defeated at Aegospotami (405 BC). The loss of her fleet threatened Athens with bankruptcy. In 404 BC Athens sued for peace, and Sparta dictated a predictably stern settlement: Athens lost her city walls, her fleet, and all of her overseas possessions. Lysander abolished the democracy and appointed in its place an oligarchy called the "Thirty Tyrants" to govern Athens.

Meanwhile, in Sparta, Timaea gave birth to a child. The child was given the name Leotychidas, after the great grandfather of Agis II—King Leotychidas of Sparta. However, because of Timaea's alleged affair with Alcibiades, it was widely rumoured that the young Leotychidas was fathered by Alcibiades. Indeed, Agis II refused to acknowledge Leotychidas as his son until he relented, in front of witnesses, on his deathbed in 400 BC.

Upon the death of Agis II, Leotychidas attempted to claim the Eurypontid throne for himself, but this was met with an outcry, led by Lysander, who was at the height of his influence in Sparta. Lysander argued that Leotychidas was a bastard and could not inherit the Eurypontid throne; instead he backed the hereditary claim of Agesilaus, son of Agis by another wife. With Lysander's support, Agesilaus became the Eurypontid king as Agesilaus II, expelled Leotychidas from the country, and took over all of Agis' estates and property.

== 4th century BC ==
Related articles: Spartan hegemony, Theban hegemony, Rise of Macedon, Wars of Alexander the Great

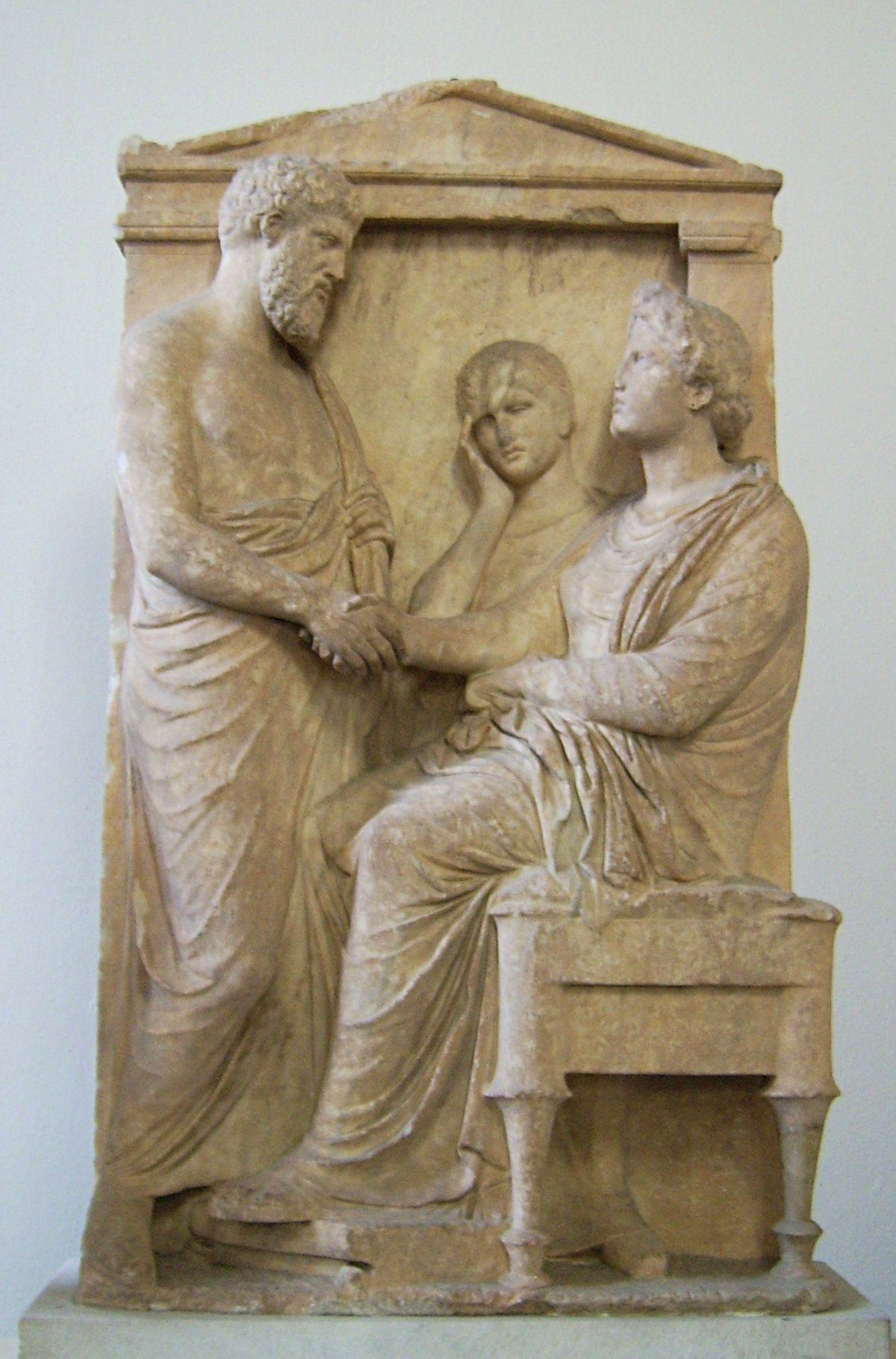
Grave relief of Thraseas and Euandria from Athens, 375–350 BC, Pergamon Museum (Berlin)

The end of the Peloponnesian War left Sparta the master of Greece, but the narrow outlook of the Spartan warrior elite did not suit them to this role. Within a few years the democratic party regained power in Athens and in other cities. In 395 BC the Spartan rulers removed Lysander from office, and Sparta lost her naval supremacy. Athens, Argos, Thebes, and Corinth, the latter two former Spartan allies, challenged Sparta's dominance in the Corinthian War, which ended inconclusively in 387 BC. That same year Sparta shocked the Greeks by concluding the Treaty of Antalcidas with Persia. The agreement turned over the Greek cities of Ionia and Cyprus, reversing a hundred years of Greek victories against Persia. Sparta then tried to further weaken the power of Thebes, which led to a war in which Thebes allied with its old enemy Athens.

Then the Theban generals Epaminondas and Pelopidas won a decisive victory at Leuctra (371 BC). The result of this battle was the end of Spartan supremacy and the establishment of Theban dominance, but Athens herself recovered much of her former power because the supremacy of Thebes was short-lived. With the death of Epaminondas at Mantinea (362 BC) the city lost its greatest leader and his successors blundered into an ineffectual ten-year war with Phocis. In 346 BC the Thebans appealed to Philip II of Macedon to help them against the Phocians, thus drawing Macedon into Greek affairs for the first time.

The Peloponnesian War was a radical turning point for the Greek world. Before 403 BC, the situation was more defined, with Athens and its allies (a zone of domination and stability, with a number of island cities benefiting from Athens' maritime protection), and other states outside this Athenian Empire. The sources denounce this Athenian supremacy (or hegemony) as smothering and disadvantageous. (Note: These sources include Xenophon's continuation of Thucydides' work in his Hellenica, which provided a continuous narrative of Greek history up to 362 BC but has defects, such as bias towards Sparta, with whose king Agesilas Xenophon lived for a while. We also have Plutarch, a 2nd-century Boeotian, whose Life of Pelopidas gives a Theban version of events and Diodorus Siculus. This is also the era where the epigraphic evidence develops, a source of the highest importance for this period, both for Athens and for a number of continental Greek cities that also issued decrees.)

After 403 BC, things became more complicated, with a number of cities trying to create similar empires over others, all of which proved short-lived. The first of these turnarounds was managed by Athens as early as 390 BC, allowing it to re-establish itself as a major power without regaining its former glory.

=== Spartan hegemony ===
This empire was powerful but short-lived. In 405 BC, the Spartans were masters of all—of Athens' allies and of Athens itself—and their power was undivided. By the end of the century, they could not even defend their own city. As noted above, in 400 BC, Agesilaus became king of Sparta.

==== Foundation of a Spartan empire ====
The subject of how to reorganize the Athenian Empire as part of the Spartan Empire provoked much heated debate among Sparta's full citizens. The admiral Lysander felt that the Spartans should rebuild the Athenian empire in such a way that Sparta profited from it. Lysander tended to be too proud to take advice from others. Prior to this, Spartan law forbade the use of all precious metals by private citizens, with transactions being carried out with cumbersome iron ingots (which generally discouraged their accumulation) and all precious metals obtained by the city becoming state property. Without the Spartans' support, Lysander's innovations came into effect and brought a great deal of profit for him—on Samos, for example, festivals known as Lysandreia were organized in his honour. He was recalled to Sparta, and once there did not attend to any important matters.

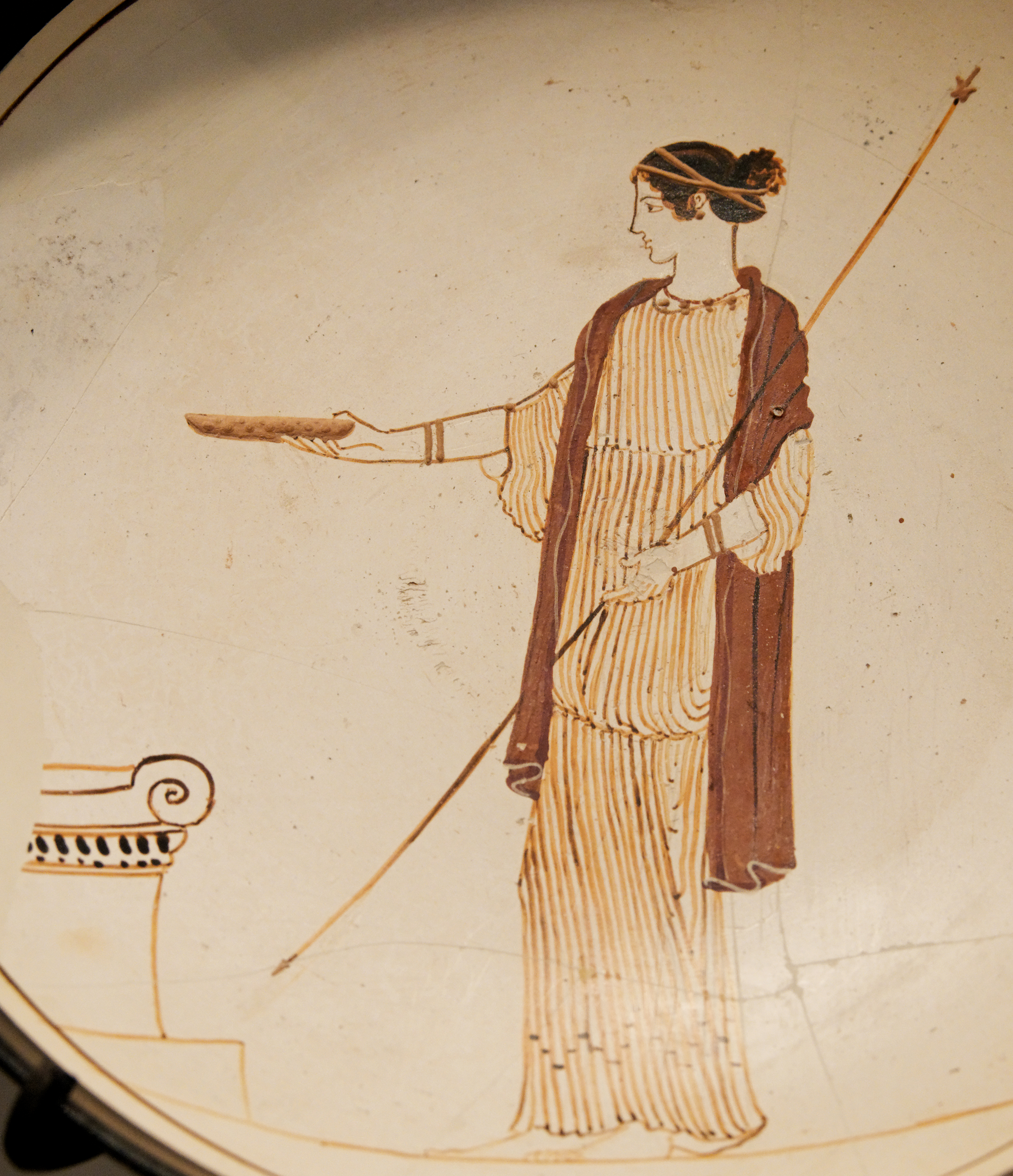
A Kylix (drinking cup) from Attica showing a goddess performing a libation, 470 BC, white ground technique pottery

Sparta refused to see Lysander or his successors dominate. Not wanting to establish a hegemony, they decided after 403 BC not to support the directives that he had made.

Agesilaus came to power by accident at the start of the 4th century BC. This accidental accession meant that, unlike the other Spartan kings, he had the advantage of a Spartan education. The Spartans at this date discovered a conspiracy against the laws of the city conducted by Cinadon and as a result concluded there were too many dangerous worldly elements at work in the Spartan state.

Agesilaus employed a political dynamic that played on a feeling of pan-Hellenic sentiment and launched a successful campaign against the Persian empire. Once again, the Persian empire played both sides against each other. The Persian Court supported Sparta in the rebuilding of their navy while simultaneously funding the Athenians, who used Persian subsidies to rebuild their long walls (destroyed in 404 BC) as well as to reconstruct their fleet and win a number of victories.

For most of the first years of his reign, Agesilaus had been engaged in a war against Persia in the Aegean Sea and in Asia Minor. In 394 BC, the Spartan authorities ordered Agesilaus to return to mainland Greece. While Agesilaus had a large part of the Spartan Army in Asia Minor, the Spartan forces protecting the homeland had been attacked by a coalition of forces led by Corinth. At the Battle of Haliartus the Spartans had been defeated by the Theban forces. Worse yet, Lysander, Sparta's chief military leader, had been killed during the battle. This was the start of what became known as the "Corinthian War" (395–387 BC). Upon hearing of the Spartan loss at Haliartus and of the death of Lysander, Agesilaus headed out of Asia Minor, back across the Hellespont, across Thrace and back towards Greece. At the Battle of Coronea, Agesilaus and his Spartan Army defeated a Theban force. During the war, Corinth drew support from a coalition of traditional Spartan enemies—Argos, Athens and Thebes. However, when the war descended into guerilla tactics, Sparta decided that it could not fight on two fronts and so chose to ally with Persia. The long Corinthian War finally ended with the Peace of Antalcidas or the King's Peace, in which the "Great King" of Persia, Artaxerxes II, pronounced a "treaty" of peace between the various city-states of Greece which broke up all "leagues" of city-states on Greek mainland and in the islands of the Aegean Sea. Although this was looked upon as "independence" for some city-states, the effect of the unilateral "treaty" was highly favourable to the interests of the Persian Empire.

The Corinthian War revealed a significant dynamic that was occurring in Greece. While Athens and Sparta fought each other to exhaustion, Thebes was rising to a position of dominance among the various Greek city-states.

==== The peace of Antalcidas ====
In 387 BC, an edict was promulgated by the Persian king, preserving the Greek cities of Asia Minor and Cyprus as well as the independence of the Greek Aegean cities, except for Lymnos, Imbros and Skyros, which were given over to Athens. It dissolved existing alliances and federations and forbade the formation of new ones. This is an ultimatum that benefited Athens only to the extent that Athens held onto three islands. While the "Great King", Artaxerxes, was the guarantor of the peace, Sparta was to act as Persia's agent in enforcing the Peace. To the Persians this document is known as the "King's Peace". To the Greeks, this document is known as the Peace of Antalcidas, after the Spartan diplomat Antalcidas who was sent to Persia as negotiator. Sparta had been worried about the developing closer ties between Athens and Persia. Accordingly, Antalcidas was directed to get whatever agreement he could from the "Great King". Accordingly, the "Peace of Antalcidas" is not a negotiated peace at all. Rather it is a surrender to the interests of Persia, drafted entirely for its benefit.

==== Spartan interventionism ====
On the other hand, this peace had unexpected consequences. In accordance with it, the Boeotian League, or Boeotian confederacy, was dissolved in 386 BC. This confederacy was dominated by Thebes, a city hostile to the Spartan hegemony. Sparta carried out large-scale operations and peripheral interventions in Epirus and in the north of Greece, resulting in the capture of the fortress of Thebes, the Cadmea, after an expedition in the Chalcidice and the capture of Olynthos. It was a Theban politician who suggested to the Spartan general Phoibidas that Sparta should seize Thebes itself. This act was sharply condemned, though Sparta eagerly ratified this unilateral move by Phoibidas. The Spartan attack was successful and Thebes was placed under Spartan control.

==== Clash with Thebes ====
In 378 BC, the reaction to Spartan control over Thebes was broken by a popular uprising within Thebes. Elsewhere in Greece, the reaction against Spartan hegemony began when Sphodrias, another Spartan general, tried to carry out a surprise attack on Piraeus. Although the gates of Piraeus were no longer fortified, Sphodrias was driven off before Piraeus. Back in Sparta, Sphodrias was put on trial for the failed attack, but was acquitted by the Spartan court. Nonetheless, the attempted attack triggered an alliance between Athens and Thebes. Sparta would now have to fight them both together. Athens was trying to recover from its defeat in the Peloponnesian War at the hands of Sparta's "navarch" Lysander in the disaster of 404 BC. The rising spirit of rebellion against Sparta also fueled Thebes' attempt to restore the former Boeotian confederacy. In Boeotia, the Theban leaders Pelopidas and Epaminondas reorganized the Theban army and began to free the towns of Boeotia from their Spartan garrisons, one by one, and incorporated these towns into the revived Boeotian League. Pelopidas won a great victory for Thebes over a much larger Spartan force in the Battle of Tegyra in 375 BC.

Theban authority grew so spectacularly in such a short time that Athens came to mistrust the growing Theban power. Athens began to consolidate its position again through the formation of a second Athenian League. Attention was drawn to growing power of Thebes when it began interfering in the political affairs of its neighbor, Phocis, and, particularly, after Thebes razed the city of Plataea, a long-standing ally of Athens, in 375 BC. The destruction of Plataea caused Athens to negotiate an alliance with Sparta against Thebes, in that same year. In 371, the Theban army, led by Epaminondas, inflicted a bloody defeat on Spartan forces at Battle of Leuctra. Sparta lost a large part of its army and 400 of its 2,000 citizen-troops. The Battle of Leuctra was a watershed in Greek history. Epaminondas' victory ended a long history of Spartan military prestige and dominance over Greece and the period of Spartan hegemony was over. However, Spartan hegemony was not replaced by Theban, but rather by Athenian hegemony.

=== Rise and fall of the second Athenian league ===
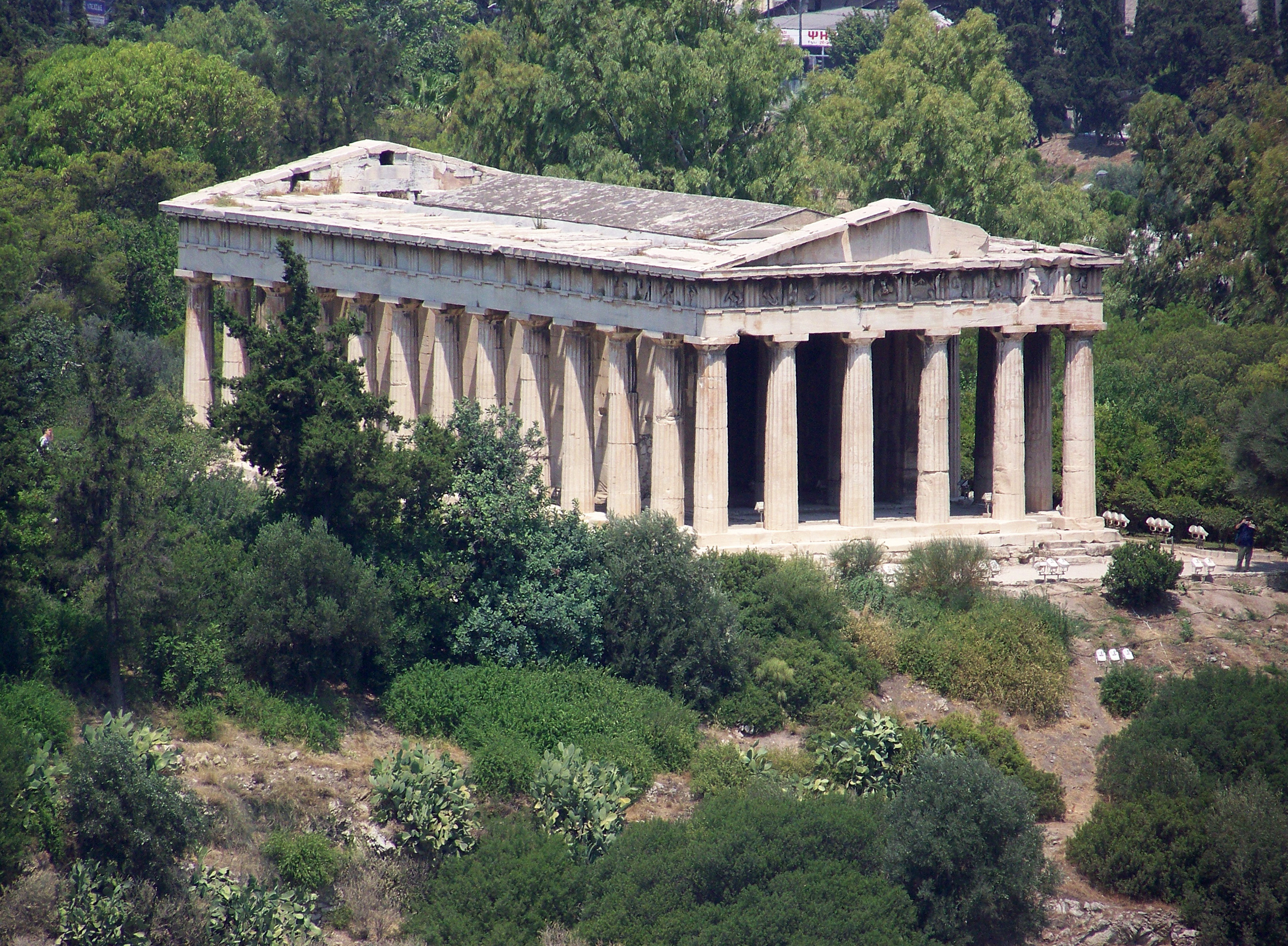
The Temple of Hephaestus at the Agora of Athens, built 449–415 BC

It was important to erase the bad memories of the former league. Its financial system was not adopted, with no tribute being paid. Instead, syntaxeis were used, irregular contributions as and when Athens and its allies needed troops, collected for a precise reason and spent as quickly as possible. These contributions were not taken to Athens—unlike the 5th century BC system, there was no central exchequer for the league—but to the Athenian generals themselves.

The Athenians had to make their own contribution to the alliance, the eisphora. They reformed how this tax was paid, creating a system in advance, the Proseiphora, in which the richest individuals had to pay the whole sum of the tax then be reimbursed by other contributors. This system was quickly assimilated into a liturgy.

This league responded to a real and present need. On the ground, however, the situation within the league proved to have changed little from that of the 5th century BC, with Athenian generals doing what they wanted and able to extort funds from the league. Alliance with Athens again looked unattractive and the allies complained.

The main reasons for the eventual failure were structural. This alliance was only valued out of fear of Sparta, which evaporated after Sparta's fall in 371 BC, losing the alliance its sole 'raison d'etre'. The Athenians no longer had the means to fulfill their ambitions, and found it difficult merely to finance their own navy, let alone that of an entire alliance, and so could not properly defend their allies. Thus, the tyrant of Pherae was able to destroy a number of cities with impunity. From 360 BC, Athens lost its reputation for invincibility and a number of allies (such as Byzantium and Naxos in 364 BC) decided to secede.

In 357 BC the revolt against the league spread, and between 357 BC and 355 BC, Athens had to face war against its allies—a war whose issue was marked by a decisive intervention by the king of Persia in the form of an ultimatum to Athens, demanding that Athens recognise its allies' independence under threat of Persia's sending 200 triremes against Athens. Athens had to renounce the war and leave the confederacy, thereby weakening itself more and more, and signaling the end of Athenian hegemony.

=== Theban hegemony – tentative and with no future ===
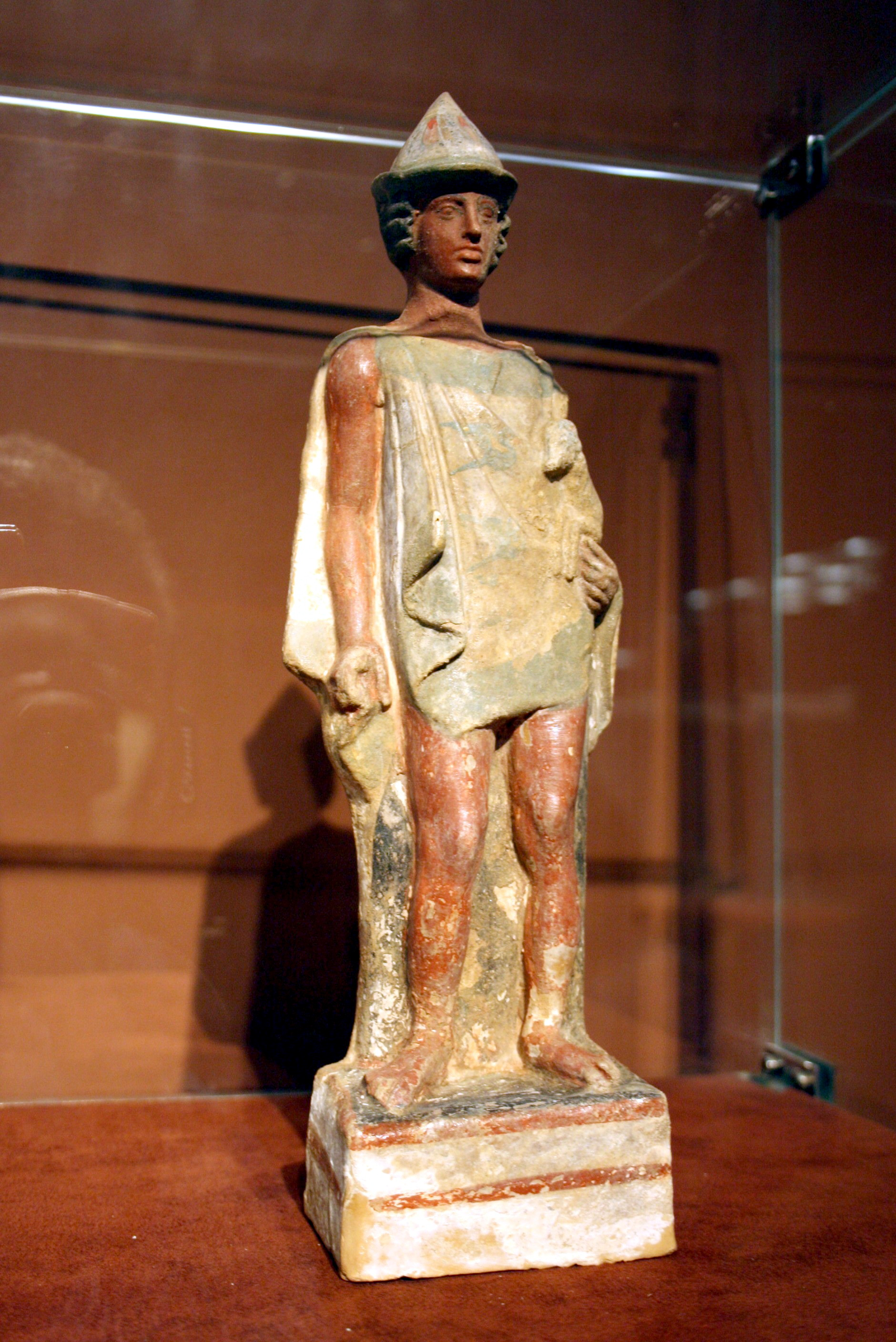
Boetian art, dating from mid-5th century BC

==== 5th century BC Boeotian confederacy (447–386 BC) ====
This was not Thebes' first attempt at hegemony. It had been the most important city of Boeotia and the centre of the previous Boeotian confederacy of 447, resurrected since 386.

The 5th-century confederacy is well known to us from a papyrus found at Oxyrhynchus and known as "the Anonyme of Thebes". Thebes headed it and set up a system under which charges were divided up between the different cities of the confederacy. Citizenship was defined according to wealth, and Thebes counted 11,000 active citizens.

The confederacy was divided up into 11 districts, each providing a federal magistrate called a "boeotarch", a certain number of council members, 1,000 hoplites and 100 horsemen. From the 5th century BC the alliance could field an infantry force of 11,000 men, in addition to an elite corps and a light infantry numbering 10,000; but its real power derived from its cavalry force of 1,100, commanded by a federal magistrate independent of local commanders. It also had a small fleet that played a part in the Peloponnesian War by providing 25 triremes for the Spartans. At the end of the conflict, the fleet consisted of 50 triremes and was commanded by a "navarch".

All this constituted a significant enough force that the Spartans were happy to see the Boeotian confederacy dissolved by the king's peace. This dissolution, however, did not last, and in the 370s there was nothing to stop the Thebans (who had lost the Cadmea to Sparta in 382 BC) from reforming this confederacy.

==== Theban reconstruction ====
Pelopidas and Epaminondas endowed Thebes with democratic institutions similar to those of Athens, the Thebans revived the title of "Boeotarch" lost in the Persian King's Peace and—with victory at Leuctra and the destruction of Spartan power—the pair achieved their stated objective of renewing the confederacy. Epaminondas rid the Peloponnesus of pro-Spartan oligarchies, replacing them with pro-Theban democracies, constructed cities, and rebuilt a number of those destroyed by Sparta. He equally supported the reconstruction of the city of Messene thanks to an invasion of Laconia that also allowed him to liberate the helots and give them Messene as a capital.

He decided in the end to constitute small confederacies all round the Peloponnessus, forming an Arcadian confederacy (the King's Peace had destroyed a previous Arcadian confederacy and put Messene under Spartan control).

==== Theban hegemony and confrontation between Sparta, Athens and Thebes ====
The strength of the Boeotian League explains Athens' problems with her allies in the second Athenian League. Epaminondas succeeded in convincing his countrymen to build a fleet of 100 triremes to pressure cities into leaving the Athenian league and joining a Boeotian maritime league. Epaminondas and Pelopidas also reformed the army of Thebes to introduce new and more effective means of fighting. Thus, the Theban army was able to carry the day against the coalition of other Greek states at the battle of Leuctra in 371 BC and the battle of Mantinea in 362 BC.

Sparta also remained an important power in the face of Theban strength. However, some of the cities allied with Sparta turned against her, because of Thebes. In 367 BC, both Sparta and Athens sent delegates to Artaxerxes II, the Great King of Persia. These delegates sought to have the Artaxerxes, once again, declare Greek independence and a unilateral common peace, just as he had done twenty years earlier in 387 BC. As noted above, this had meant the destruction of the Boeotian League in 387 BC. Sparta and Athens now hoped the same thing would happen with a new declaration of a similar "Kings Peace". Thebes sent Pelopidas to argue against them. The Great King was convinced by Pelopidas and the Theban diplomats that Thebes and the Boeotian League would be the best agents of Persian interests in Greece, and, accordingly, did not issue a new "King's Peace". Thus, to deal with Thebes, Athens and Sparta were thrown back on their own resources. Thebes, meanwhile, expanded its influence beyond the bounds of Boeotia. In 364 BC, Pelopidas defeated the Alexander of Pherae in the Battle of Cynoscephalae, located in south-eastern Thessaly in northern Greece. However, during the battle, Pelopides was killed.

The confederational framework of Sparta's relationship with her allies was really an artificial one, since it attempted to bring together cities that had never been able to agree on much at all in the past. Such was the case with the cities of Tegea and Mantinea, which re-allied in the Arcadian confederacy. The Mantineans received the support of the Athenians, and the Tegeans that of the Thebans. In 362 BC, Epaminondas led a Theban army against a coalition of Athenian, Spartan, Elisian, Mantinean and Achean forces. Battle was joined at Mantinea. The Thebans prevailed, but this triumph was short-lived, for Epaminondas died in the battle, stating that "I bequeath to Thebes two daughters, the victory of Leuctra and the victory at Mantinea".

Despite the victory at Mantinea, in the end, the Thebans abandoned their policy of intervention in the Peloponnesus. This event is looked upon as a watershed in Greek history. Thus, Xenophon concludes his history of the Greek world at this point, in 362 BC. The end of this period was even more confused than its beginning. Greece had failed and, according to Xenophon, the history of the Greek world was no longer intelligible.

The idea of hegemony disappeared. From 362 BC onward, there was no longer a single city that could exert hegemonic power in Greece. The Spartans were greatly weakened; the Athenians were in no condition to operate their navy, and after 365 no longer had any allies; Thebes could only exert an ephemeral dominance, and had the means to defeat Sparta and Athens but not to be a major power in Asia Minor.

Other forces also intervened, such as the Persian king, who appointed himself arbitrator among the Greek cities, with their tacit agreement. This situation reinforced the conflicts and there was a proliferation of civil wars, with the confederal framework a repeated trigger for them. One war led to another, each longer and more bloody than the last, and the cycle could not be broken. Hostilities even took place during winter for the first time, with the invasion of Laconia in 370 BC.

=== Rise of Macedon under Philip II ===
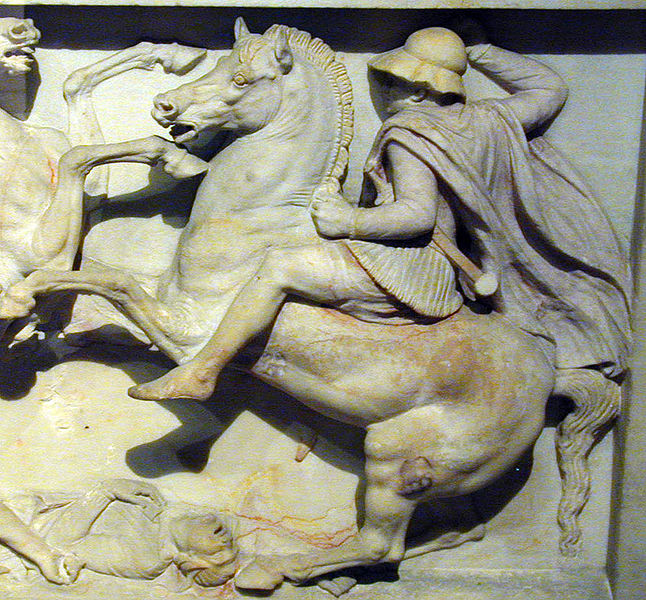
Thessalian cavalryman on the Alexander Sarcophagus, late 4th century BC (Istanbul Archaeological Museum)

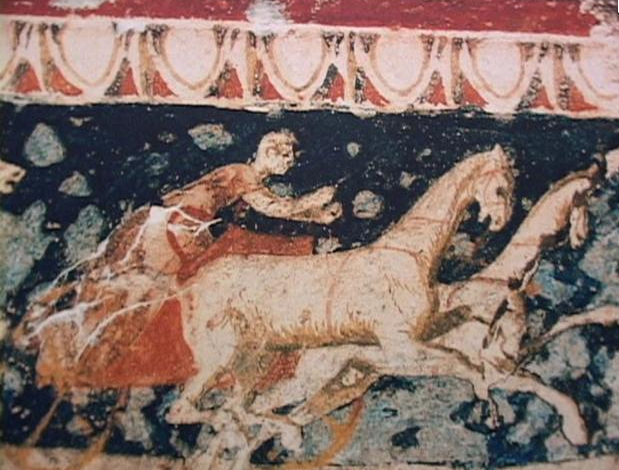
A wall mural of a charioteer from the Macedonian royal tombs at Vergina, late 6th century BC

Thebes sought to maintain its position until finally eclipsed by the rising power of Macedon in 346 BC. The energetic leadership within Macedon began in 359 BC when Philip of Macedon was made regent for his nephew, Amyntas. Within a short time, Philip was acclaimed king as Philip II of Macedonia in his own right, with succession of the throne established on his own heirs. During his lifetime, Philip II consolidated his rule over Macedonia. This was done by 359 BC and Philip began to look toward expanding Macedonia's influence abroad.

Under Philip II, (359–336 BC), who was a member of the Argead dynasty, Macedon expanded into the territory of the Paeonians, Thracians, and Illyrians. In 358 BC, Philip allied with Epirus in its campaign against Illyria. In 357 BC, Philip came into direct conflict with Athens when he conquered the Thracian port city of Amphipolis, a city located at the mouth of the Strymon River to the east of Macedonia, and a major Athenian trading port. Conquering this city allowed Philip to subjugate all of Thrace. A year later in 356 BC, the Macedonians attacked and conquered the Athenian-controlled port city of Pydna. This brought the Macedonian threat to Athens closer to home to the Athenians. With the start of the Phocian War in 356 BC, the great Athenian orator and political leader of the "war party", Demosthenes, became increasingly active in encouraging Athens to fight vigorously against Philip's expansionist aims. In 352 BC, Demosthenes gave many speeches against the Macedonian threat, declaring Philip II Athens' greatest enemy. The leader of the Athenian "peace party" was Phocion, who wished to avoid a confrontation that, Phocion felt, would be catastrophic for Athens. Despite Phocion's attempts to restrain the war party, Athens remained at war with Macedonia for years following the original declaration of war. Negotiations between Athens and Philip II started only in 346 BC. The Athenians successfully halted Philip's invasion of Attica at Thermopylae that same year in 352 BC. However, Philip defeated the Phocians at the Battle of the Crocus Field. The conflict between Macedonia and a coalition of Greek city-states led by Athens and Thebes came to a head in 338 BC, at the Battle of Chaeronea.

Macedonians became more politically involved with the south-central city-states of Greece, but also retained more archaic aspects harking back to the palace culture, first at Aegae (modern Vergina) then at Pella, resembling Mycenaean culture more than that of the Classical city-states. Militarily, Philip recognized the new phalanx style of fighting that had been employed by Epaminondas and Pelopidas in Thebes. Accordingly, he incorporated this new system into the ancient Macedonian army. Philip II also brought a Theban military tutor to Macedon to instruct the future Alexander the Great in the Theban method of fighting.

Philip's son Alexander the Great (356–323 BC) was born in Pella, the capital of Macedonia. Philip II brought Aristotle to Pella to teach the young Alexander. Besides Alexander's mother, Olympias, Philip took another wife by the name of Cleopatra Eurydice. Cleopatra had a daughter, Europa, and a son, Caranus. Caranus posed a threat to the succession of Alexander. Cleopatra Eurydice was a Macedonian and, thus, Caranus was all Macedonian in blood. Olympias, on the other hand, was from Epirus and, thus, Alexander was regarded as being only half-Macedonian (Cleopatra Eurydice should not be confused with Cleopatra of Macedon, who was Alexander's full-sister and thus daughter of Philip and Olympias).

Philip II was assassinated at the wedding of his daughter Cleopatra of Macedon with King Alexander I of Epirus in 336 BC at Aigai. Philip's son, the future Alexander the Great, immediately claimed the throne of Macedonia by eliminating all the other claimants to the throne, including Caranus and his cousin Amytas. Alexander was only twenty years of age when he assumed the throne.

=== Alexander the Great's empire ===
Thereafter, Alexander succeeded his father as the hegemon of the Hellenic League and inherited his father's plan to invade the Persian empire. After the destruction of Thebes, Alexander traveled to Athens to meet the public directly. Despite Demosthenes' speeches against the Macedonian threat on behalf of the war party of Athens, the public in Athens was still very much divided between the "peace party" and Demosthenes' "war party". However, the arrival of Alexander charmed the Athenian public. The peace party was strengthened and then a peace between Athens and Macedonia was agreed. This allowed Alexander to move on his and the Greeks' long-held dream of conquest in the east, with a unified and secure Greece at his back.

In 334 BC, Alexander with about 30,000 infantry soldiers and 5,000 cavalry crossed the Hellespont into Asia. He never returned. As king of Macedon and hegemon of the Hellenic league he conquered the Achaemenid empire in less than a decade after the battles of (Granicus, Issus, the Siege of Tyre (332 BC) and battle of Gaugamela. Then he defeated the Indian kingdom of Porus at the battle of Hydaspes. Thus, Alexander managed to briefly extend Macedonian power to Persia, Egypt and lands as far east as the fringes of India. He managed to spread Greek culture throughout the known world. Alexander the Great died in 323 BC in Babylon while planning a new campaign of conquest.

The Classical period conventionally ends at the death of Alexander the Great in 323 BC and the fragmentation of his empire, divided among the Diadochi, which marks the beginning of the Hellenistic period.

== Legacy of classical Greece ==
The legacy of Greece was strongly felt by post-Renaissance European elite, who saw themselves as the spiritual heirs of Greece. Will Durant wrote in 1939 that "excepting machinery, there is hardly anything secular in our culture that does not come from Greece," and conversely "there is nothing in Greek civilization that doesn't illuminate our own".

== See also ==
- Classics
- Art in ancient Greece
- Hellenistic Greece
