= Europa of Macedon =

Half-sister of Alexander the Great

Europa of Macedon (Greek: Ευρώπη) was the daughter of Philip II by his last wife, Cleopatra Eurydice. She is widely believed to have been murdered along with her mother, by Olympias, Philip's fourth wife and the mother of Alexander the Great.

== See also ==
- Caranus (son of Philip II)
