= Alexander the Great (disambiguation) =

Alexander the Great (356–323 BC) was the king of Macedon and hegemon of the Hellenic League (336–323 BC), who conquered the Achaemenid Empire.

Alexander the Great may also refer to:

== Films about Alexander the Great ==
- Alexander the Great (1956 film), an American film
- Alexander (2004 film), an American film directed by Oliver Stone
  - Alexander (soundtrack), the original film score by Greek composer Vangelis
- Alexander the Great (miniseries), a 2014 German documentary film

== Other uses related to the king of Macedon ==
- Alexander the Great in legend
- Alexander the Great Marathon, annual marathon race between Pella and Thessaloniki, in Central Macedonia, Greece
- Alexander the Great (board game), a 1971 board game
- "Alexander the Great", a 1986 song by Iron Maiden from Somewhere in Time
- In the Footsteps of Alexander the Great, a BBC documentary television series
- Megas Alexandros, Pella, a former municipality in Greece
- Kavala International Airport "Alexander the Great", in Kavala, Eastern Macedonia and Thrace, Greece
- Skopje International Airport, in Skopje, North Macedonia, previously Skopje "Alexander the Great" Airport (2006–2018)
- Aleksandar Makedonski, a Yugoslav Macedonian rock band
- French ship Alexandre
- Alexander the Great in the Quran, Islamic prophet (possible interpretation of Zul Qarnain)
- Alexander (crater), a lunar impact crater

== Other uses ==
- Alexander I the Great or Alexander I of Georgia (1386–1445/6), King of Georgia (1412–1442)
- Nickname for Alexander Ovechkin (born 1985), Russian hockey player
- Nickname for Alexander Volkanovski (born 1988), Australian MMA fighter
- Alexander the Great (drag king), American drag king
- Alexander the Great (1980 film), a Greek film
- Alexander the Great (2010 film), an Indian Malayalam-language film
- Alexander the Great (Monty Alexander album) (1965)
- Alexander the Great (Eric Alexander album) (2000)

== See also ==
- Alexander (disambiguation)
- Alexander of Macedon (disambiguation)
