= Alexander (2004 film) =

2004 epic historical drama film by Oliver Stone

- Theatrical release poster
- Directed by: Oliver Stone
- Screenplay by: Oliver Stone; Christopher Kyle; Laeta Kalogridis
- Based on: Alexander the Great by Robin Lane Fox
- Produced by: Thomas Schühly; Jon Kilik; Iain Smith; Moritz Borman
- Starring: Colin Farrell; Angelina Jolie; Val Kilmer; Jared Leto; Rosario Dawson; Anthony Hopkins
- Cinematography: Rodrigo Prieto
- Edited by: Thomas J. Nordberg; Yann Hervé; Alex Marquez
- Music by: Vangelis
- Production companies: Warner Bros. Pictures; Intermedia Films; Moritz Borman Productions; IMF Internationale Medien und Film GmbH & Co. 3 Produktions KG
- Distributed by: Warner Bros. Pictures (English-speaking territories, Latin America, and Italy); Constantin Film (Germany); Pathé Distribution (France); A-Film Distribution (Netherlands); Summit Entertainment (Overseas territories)
- Release dates: 16 November 2004 (Hollywood); 24 November 2004 (United States); 23 December 2004 (Germany and Netherlands); 5 January 2005 (France); 14 January 2005 (Italy)
- Running time: 175 minutes (see Alternative versions)
- Countries: Germany; France; Italy; Netherlands; United Kingdom; United States
- Language: English
- Budget: $155 million
- Box office: $167.3 million

Alexander is a 2004 epic biographical historical drama film based on the life of the ancient Macedonian general and king Alexander the Great. It was co-written and directed by Oliver Stone and starred Colin Farrell. The film's original screenplay was derived in part from the book Alexander the Great, published in 1973 by the University of Oxford historian Robin Lane Fox. After release, it performed well in Europe, but the American critical reaction was mixed to negative with criticism aimed at Farrell's casting, the runtime and historical inaccuracies but praise for the performances, action, soundtrack, and visuals. It also grossed $167.3 million worldwide against a $155 million budget, thus making it a box-office bomb. The film also stars Angelina Jolie, Val Kilmer, Jared Leto, Christopher Plummer, Rosario Dawson and Anthony Hopkins.

Four versions of the film exist: the initial theatrical cut and three home video director's cuts: the "Director's Cut" in 2005, the "Final Cut" in 2007, and the "Ultimate Cut" in 2014. The two earlier DVD versions of Alexander ("director's cut" version and the theatrical version) sold over 3.5 million copies in the United States. Oliver Stone's third version, Alexander Revisited: The Final Cut (2007), sold nearly a million copies and became one of the highest-selling catalog items from Warner Bros. Pictures (as of 2012).

== Plot ==
Around 285 BC, Ptolemy I Soter, basileus and pharaoh of Ptolemaic Egypt, narrates the life of Alexander. Alexander grows up with his mother Olympias and his tutor Aristotle, where he finds interest in love, honor, music, exploration, poetry and military combat. His relationship with his father, Philip II of Macedon, is destroyed when Philip marries Attalus's niece, Eurydice. Alexander insults Philip after disowning Attalus as his kinsman, which results in Alexander's banishment from Philip's palace.

After Philip is assassinated, Alexander becomes King of Macedonia. Ptolemy mentions Alexander's punitive campaign in which he razes Thebes, also referring to the later burning of Persepolis, then gives an overview of Alexander's west-Persian campaign, including his declaration as the son of Zeus by the Oracle of Amun at Siwa Oasis, his great battle against the Persian Emperor Darius III in the Battle of Gaugamela, and his eight-year campaign across Asia.

Alexander's most private relationships are these with his childhood friends; Glaucos (who receives a mercy killing from Alexander when wounded at Gaugamela), Hephaestion, Bagoas, and later his wife, Roxana. Hephaestion compares Alexander to Achilles, to which Alexander replies that Hephaestion must be his Patroclus (Achilles's friend and possible lover). When Hephaestion mentions that Patroclus died first, Alexander pledges that, if Hephaestion should die first, he will follow him into the afterlife (as Achilles had done for Patroclus). Hephaestion shows extensive jealousy when Alexander marries Roxana, going so far as to attempt to keep her away from him after Alexander murders Cleitus the Black in India during a drunken rage.

After initial objection from his soldiers, Alexander convinces them to join him in his final and bloodiest battle, the Battle of Hydaspes. He is severely injured with an arrow but survives and is celebrated. Later on, Hephaestion succumbs to typhus carried with him from India, and dies, deeply saddening Alexander. During a symposium in Babylon, Alexander falls unconscious after downing a large bowl of wine. On his deathbed, Bagoas grieves as Alexander's generals begin to split up his kingdom and fight over the ownership of his body.

In 285 BC, Ptolemy admits to his scribe that he, along with all the other officers, had indeed poisoned Alexander just to spare themselves from any future conquests or consequences. However, he has it recorded that Alexander died due to illness compounding his overall weakened condition. He then goes on to end his memoirs with praise to Alexander.

Ptolemy's memoirs of Alexander were eventually burned, lost forever with other scrolls of the Library of Alexandria by the end of the Roman Empire.

== Cast ==
- Colin Farrell as Alexander
  - Jessie Kamm as child Alexander
  - Connor Paolo as young Alexander
- Angelina Jolie as Queen Olympias
- Val Kilmer as King Philip II
- Christopher Plummer as Aristotle
- Jared Leto as Hephaestion
  - Patrick Carroll as young Hephaestion
- Rosario Dawson as Roxana
- Anthony Hopkins as old Ptolemy
  - Elliot Cowan as adult Ptolemy
  - Robert Earley as young Ptolemy
- Jonathan Rhys Meyers as Cassander
  - Morgan Christopher Ferris as young Cassander
- Brian Blessed as wrestling trainer
- Tim Pigott-Smith as omen reader
- David Bedella as scribe Cadmus
- Fiona O'Shaughnessy as nurse
- Gary Stretch as Cleitus the Black
- John Kavanagh as Parmenion
- Nick Dunning as Attalus
- Marie Meyer as Eurydice
- Mick Lally as horse seller
- Joseph Morgan as Philotas
- Ian Beattie as Antigonus
- Denis Conway as Nearchus
  - Peter Williamson as young Nearchus
- Neil Jackson as Perdiccas
  - Aleczander Gordon as young Perdiccas
- Garrett Lombard as Leonnatus
- Chris Aberdein as Polyperchon
- Rory McCann as Craterus
- Raz Degan as Darius
- Erol Sander as Persian prince
- Stéphane Ferrara as Bessus, Bactrian commander
- Tadhg Murphy as dying soldier
- Francisco Bosch as Bagoas
- Annelise Hesme as Stateira
- Toby Kebbell as Pausanias of Orestis
- Laird Macintosh as Greek officer
- Féodor Atkine as Oxyartes, Roxana's father
- Bin Bunluerit as King Porus of India
- Jaran Ngramdee as Indian prince
- Brian McGrath as doctor
- Oliver Stone as Macedonian soldier at Zeus Statue (uncredited)

== Controversies ==
A group of 25 Greek lawyers initially threatened to file a lawsuit against both Stone and Warner Bros. Pictures for what they claimed was an inaccurate portrayal of history. "We are not saying that we are against gays," said Yannis Varnakos, "but we are saying that the production company should make it clear to the audience that this film is pure fiction and not a true depiction of the life of Alexander". After an advance screening of the film, the lawyers announced that they would not pursue such a course of action.

At the British premiere of the film, Stone blamed "raging fundamentalism in morality" for the film's failure at the US box office. He argued that American critics and audiences had blown the issue of Alexander's sexuality out of proportion. The criticism prompted him to make significant changes to the film for its DVD release, whose cover characterizes them as making it "faster paced, more action-packed".

== Reception ==
=== Box office ===
Alexander was released in 2,445 venues on 24 November 2004 and earned $13.7 million in its opening weekend, ranking sixth in the North American box office and second among the week's new releases. Upon closing on 1 February 2005, the film grossed $34.3 million domestically and $133 million overseas for a worldwide total of $167.3 million. Based on a $155 million production budget, as well as additional marketing costs, the film was a box-office bomb, with projected losses of as much as $71 million.

=== Critical reception ===
On Rotten Tomatoes the film holds an approval rating of 15% based on 201 reviews, with an average rating of 4.00/10. The website's critical consensus states: "Even at nearly three hours long, this ponderous, talky, and emotionally distant biopic fails to illuminate Alexander's life." On Metacritic, the film has a weighted average score of 40 out of 100, based on 42 critics, indicating "mixed or average" reviews. Audiences polled by CinemaScore gave the film an average grade of "D+" on an A+ to F scale.

One of the principal complaints among American film critics was that Alexander resembled less an action-drama film than a history documentary. Roger Ebert of the Chicago Sun-Times, giving the film two out of four stars, wrote in his review, "[W]e welcome the scenes of battle, pomp and circumstance because at least for a time we are free of the endless narration of Ptolemy the historian."

Faint praise came from Todd McCarthy of Variety who wrote, "Oliver Stone's Alexander is at best an honorable failure, an intelligent and ambitious picture that crucially lacks dramatic flair and emotional involvement. Dry and academic where Troy (2004) was vulgar and willfully ahistorical".

Keith Uhlich of The A.V. Club named Alexander: The Ultimate Cut the tenth-best film of 2014.

=== Nominations ===
The film was nominated in six categories at the Golden Raspberry Awards in 2005: Worst Picture, Worst Actor (Colin Farrell), Worst Actress (Angelina Jolie) and Worst Director (Oliver Stone), Worst Supporting Actor (Val Kilmer) and Worst Screenplay, thereby becoming the second-most-nominated potential "Razzie" film of 2004; however, it won no awards.

At the 2004 Stinkers Bad Movie Awards, it received nine nominations: Worst Picture, Worst Director (Stone), Worst Actor (Farrell), Worst Supporting Actress (both Jolie and Dawson), Worst Screenplay, Most Intrusive Musical Score, Worst Female Fake Accent (Dawson and Jolie, lumped into one nomination), and Least "Special" Special Effects. Its only wins were for Most Intrusive Musical Score and Worst Female Fake Accent.

== Versions ==
Several versions of the film have been released, and these have generally been seen as improvements on the initial release version. Critic Peter Sobczynski said "The various expansions and rejiggerings have improved it immeasurably, and what was once a head-scratching mess has reformed into an undeniably fascinating example of epic cinema."

=== Theatrical cut (2004) ===
This is the film as it was originally released in theaters, with a running time of 175 minutes. It was released on DVD and is also available on Blu-ray in some territories.

=== Director's cut (2005) ===
Stone's director's cut was re-edited before the DVD release later in 2005. Stone removed seventeen minutes of footage and added nine. This shortened the running time from 175 minutes to 167.

=== Alexander Revisited: The Final Unrated Cut (2007) ===
Stone also made an extended version of Alexander. "I'm doing a third version on DVD, not theatrical", he said, in an interview with Rope of Silicon. "I'm going to do a Cecil B. DeMille three-hour-45-minute thing; I'm going to go all out, put everything I like in the movie. He [Alexander] was a complicated man, it was a complicated story, and it doesn't hurt to make it longer and let people who loved the film [...] see it more and understand it more."

The extended version was released under the title of Alexander Revisited: The Final Unrated Cut on 27 February 2007. The two-disc set featured a new introduction by Stone. "Over the last two years," he said, "I have been able to sort out some of the unanswered questions about this highly complicated and passionate monarch – questions I failed to answer dramatically enough. This film represents my complete and last version, as it will contain all the essential footage we shot. I don't know how many film-makers have managed to make three versions of the same film, but I have been fortunate to have the opportunity because of the success of video and DVD sales in the world, and I felt, if I didn't do it now, with the energy and memory I still have for the subject, it would never quite be the same again. For me, this is the complete Alexander, the clearest interpretation I can offer."

The film is restructured into two acts with an intermission. Alexander Revisited takes a more in-depth look at Alexander's life and his relationships with Olympias, Philip, Hephaestion, Roxana, and Ptolemy. The film has a running time of three hours and 34 minutes (214 minutes, about 40 minutes longer than the theatrical cut and almost 50 minutes longer than the first director's cut) and is presented in 2.40:1 anamorphic widescreen with English Dolby Digital 5.1 Surround audio. Beyond the new introduction with Stone, there are no other extras on the DVD except for a free coupon to the movie 300. The Blu-ray and HD-DVD releases both feature a variety of special features however, including two audio commentaries and a new featurette.

For seven years, it was the only version of the film available on Blu-ray, until the release of the Ultimate Cut, which also includes the Theatrical Cut. The Final Unrated Cut was also released on 4K Ultra HD Blu-ray on 1 July 2025.

=== Alexander – The Ultimate Cut (2014) ===
In November 2012, Stone revealed that he was working on a fourth cut of the film at Warner's request, and that this time around he would remove material, as he felt he had added in too much in the "Final Cut". The version, which is 206 minutes long, premiered on 3 July 2013 at the Karlovy Vary International Film Festival and Stone swears that no more versions will follow. Alexander: The Ultimate Cut (Tenth Anniversary Edition) was released in the United States on 3 June 2014.

== See also ==
- Alexander the Great (disambiguation)
- Alexander (video game)
- Ishtar Gate of Babylon, Pergamon Museum, Berlin
- List of historical drama films
