= Alkimachos of Pydna =

Alkimachos of Pydna (Greek: Ἀλκίμαχος), son of Neoptolemus, was a three-year-old child buried in Pydna (2nd/1st century BC). The epigraphy of the tomb stele declares that he was a descendant of Olympias, mother of Alexander the Great. Pydna is also a possible place for the tomb of Olympias.

Aeacid is my race, Neoptolemus is my father, my name is Alkimachos, of those coming from Olympias...
