= French ship Alexandre =

A number of French ships of the French Navy have borne the name Alexandre in honour of Alexander the Great:

== Ships named Alexandre ==
- Alexandre (1771), an Artésien-class 64-gun ship of the line
- Alexandre (1782), a brig, formerly the British privateer Alexander
- Jemmapes (1794), a Téméraire-class 74-gun ship of the line, was laid down as Alexandre before being renamed.
- Alexandre (1794), formerly HMS Alexander, built in 1778 and captured in the action of 6 November 1794
- Indivisible (1799), a Tonnant-class 80-gun ship of the line, was renamed Alexandre on 5 February 1803.
- Donawerth (1854), a 90-gun Suffren-class ship of the line, was started as Alexandre in 1827
- Alexandre (1846), a Nil-class packet steamer
- Alexandre (1857), a 90-gun Suffren-class ship of the line
Ships of the French Navy named Alexandre
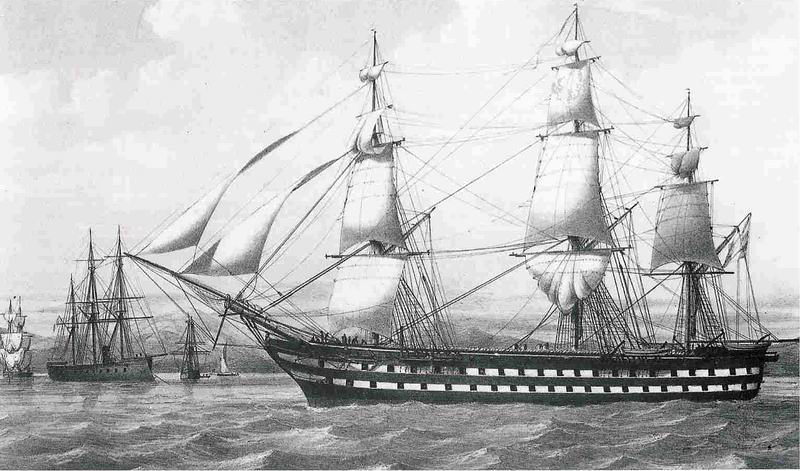
Portrait of Alexandre (1857) as a gunnery school ship, her engine removed after 1873. by François Roux.

== Notes and references ==
=== Bibliography ===
- Roche, Jean-Michel (2005). Dictionnaire des bâtiments de la flotte de guerre française de Colbert à nos jours. Vol. 1. Group Retozel-Maury Millau. pp. 33–34. ISBN 978-2-9525917-0-6. OCLC 165892922.
