= Neoptolemus I of Epirus =

King of Epirus from 370 BC to 357 BC

Neoptolemus I
- King of Epirus
- Reign: 370-357 BC
- Predecessor: Alcetas I of Epirus
- Successor: Arybbas of Epirus
- Issue: Alexander I of Epirus; Olympias (married Philip II of Macedon); Troas (married Arybbas of Epirus)
- House: Aeacidae
- Father: Alcetas I
- Religion: Ancient Greek religion

Neoptolemus I of Epirus (Greek: Νεοπτόλεμος Α' Ηπείρου) (370–357 BC) was a Greek king of Epirus and son of Alcetas I, and father of Troas, Alexander I of Epirus and Queen Olympias. He was the maternal grandfather of Alexander the Great and great-grandfather of Pyrrhus of Epirus. He claimed he was a descendant of the hero Achilles and King Lycomedes, while Emperor Caracalla claimed that he was a descendant of Neoptolemus.

== Etymology ==
His name means "new war". This was also a name of the son of the warrior Achilles and the Princess Deidamia in Greek mythology, and also the mythical progenitor of the ruling dynasty of the Molossians of ancient Epirus.

== Reign ==
On the death of Alcetas, Neoptolemus and his brother Arybbas agreed to divide the kingdom, and continued to rule their respective portions without any interruption of the harmony between them, until the death of Neoptolemus, which, according to German historian Johann Gustav Droysen, may be placed about 360 BC. The first epigraphical evidence of the Molossian League goes back to 370 BC under Neoptolemus.

== See also ==
- List of the kings of Ancient Epirus

== Notes ==
Preceded by Alcetas I	King of Epirus with Arymbas; 370–357 BC	Succeeded by Arymbas
