= Marie Meyer =

French actress and model

- Born: Marie Cécile Marthe Françoise Meyer; July 18, 1984 (age 42); Mulhouse, Alsace, France
- Modeling information
- Height: 5 ft 9.5 in (1.77 m)
- Hair color: Brown
- Eye color: Brown
- Agency: VIVA Model Management

Marie Meyer (born July 18, 1984 in Mulhouse, France) is an actress and model. She is currently represented by City Model Management in Paris, and the Hive in London.

== Biography ==
Marie Meyer began modeling at the age of seventeen, for Spoon Magazine shot by Ellen Von Unwerth and has since appeared on magazine covers such as Marie-Claire and Elle, and in advertisements from Yves Saint Laurent to Jean Paul Gaultier. She has been photographed by photographers like Peter Lindbergh, Inez van Lamsweerde and Vinoodh Matadin, Jean-Baptiste Mondino, and Jonas Bresnan in 2012 for Vogue. She was featured alongside singer Lenny Kravitz in the October 2005 in edition Uomo Vogue shot on tour with Aerosmith photographed by Mark Seliger and in the June 2005 edition of Elle Us Photographed by Enrique Badulescu. She has modeled for such designers/brands as Chanel, Hermès, Jean Paul Gaultier, Yves Saint Laurent, Elie Saab, Zuhair Murad, Comme des Garcons, Junya Watanabe, Maison Martin Margiela, Giorgio Armani and Ungaro among others.

She had her acting debut in March 2004, playing the role of Eurydice in Alexander directed by Oliver Stone. She also played herself, as a model in The Diving Bell and the Butterfly directed by Julian Schnabel alongside Lenny Kravitz. Later in 2017, she joined the team of The Fashion Freak Show

Marie has two sons, Joah (born 2007), and Asai (born 2021)

== Filmography ==
- Alexander directed by Oliver Stone (2004)
- The Diving Bell and the Butterfly directed by Julian Schnabel (2007)
