= Caranus (son of Philip II) =

Half-brother of Alexander the Great (died 336 BC)

Caranus or Karanos (Greek: Κάρανος, romanized: Káranos) was the son of Philip II and a half-brother of Alexander the Great. His mother was Cleopatra Eurydice of Macedon and so Caranus was an infant at the time of his death. Cleopatra Eurydice bore Philip also a female child, Europa, shortly before his death in October 336 BC.

According to Justin, Alexander III had killed Caranus soon after his accession in 336 BC because he feared him.

Pausanias reports that Olympias was responsible for the deaths of Cleopatra and her children.

== See also ==
- Europa of Macedon
