= Roloff Beny =

Canadian photographer

- Born: Wilfred Roy Beny; January 7, 1924; Medicine Hat, Alberta, Canada
- Died: March 16, 1984 (aged 60)
- Occupation: photographer
- Awards: Order of Canada

Roloff Beny OC RCA (7 January 1924 – 16 March 1984) was a Canadian photographer who spent the better part of his life in Rome and on his photographic travels throughout the world. Born Wilfred Roy Beny in Medicine Hat, Alberta, he later took as his first name Roloff, his mother's maiden name.

== Life ==
Beny was born in Medicine Hat, Alberta on January 7, 1924.

Beny studied at the University of Toronto and took art classes at the Banff Centre for the Arts and the University of Iowa. At Iowa, he studied with master printmaker Mauricio Lasansky, who gave him one of his prints. Beny began photographing in the 1950s simply as a way to capture scenes for his paintings before growing more interested in the medium.

He maintained a photographic studio in Lethbridge, Alberta throughout his life and used the studio while visiting his relatives.

== Development of fame ==
Beny had a considerable reputation and exhibition record as the maker of progressive painting, drawing and printmaking in the late 1940s and early 1950s. He was recognized as one of the leading abstract artists of his day with works of the period exhibited and collected at that time by the Metropolitan Museum of Art, the Museum of Modern Art, the Art Gallery of Ontario, and the National Gallery of Canada, among others. His work in painting, drawing and prints is discussed in Roloff Beny Visual Journeys.

His book To Every Thing There is a Season was presented to visiting heads of state during Canada's 1967 centennial celebration. In 1968 his book India was chosen by the Indian Government to celebrate the centenary of Gandhi's birth.

Canada, as Beny remarked, had "no temples two thousand years old, no paths worn hard by passionate travelers." But the photographer soon found his way to those paths and temples in the course of "insatiable wanderings in Europe and Asia," and, above all, around the perimeter of the Mediterranean. Beny was in early days a protégé of Peggy Guggenheim and Herbert Read. The circle of friends around him—actors, artists, collectors, writers—included Laurence Olivier, Stephen Spender, Rose Macaulay, Bernard Berenson, Jean Cocteau, Henry Moore, and other makers of art and literature. His books have been published in America, Canada, England, France, Germany, Italy, Spain, the Netherlands, Yugoslavia, Denmark, Sweden, Finland, Iran, and Japan.

== Career in its peak; life's end ==
Beny was obsessed with the beauty of the world. He has been called "a poetic photographer" and he was a passionate aesthete. His photographic journeys were recorded in a series of large-scale volumes which appeared over the years. Beny's work is in the collections of the Museum of Modern Art, the National Gallery of Canada, and the Yale University Art Gallery. "I see majestic ruins even in the architecture of the skies," he wrote in the Preface to his book, Pleasure of Ruins.

Roloff Beny died March 16, 1984, of a heart attack, aged 60, in his Roman studio overlooking the Tiber. His last four volumes appeared posthumously.

Beny donated his artwork including collections of Canadian and international art, together with his papers, to the University of Lethbridge Art Gallery.

== Roloff Beny's books ==
- 1958 – The Thrones of Earth and Heaven, H.N. Abrams
- 1962 – A Time of Gods, Studio, ISBN 9780670714131
- 1964 – Interprets in Photographs: Pleasure of Ruins, Holt, Rinehart and Winston, ISBN 9780030210914
- 1967 – To Every Thing There is a Season, Roloff Beny in Canada, Thames and Hudson
- 1967 – Japan in Color, McGraw-Hill
- 1969 – India, Roloff Beny and Aubrey Menen, Thames & Hudson Ltd, ISBN 9780500240694
- 1970 – Island Ceylon, Studio, ISBN 9780670402090
- 1974 – Roloff Beny in Italy, McClelland and Stewart, ISBN 9780771000171
- 1974 – Persia, Bridge of Turquoise, Roloff Beny, Seyyed Hossein Nasr and Mitchell Crites, New York Graphic Society, ISBN 9780821206713
- 1978 – Iran, Elements of Destiny, Everest House, ISBN 9780896960008
- 1981 – The Churches of Rome, Roloff Beny and Peter Gunn, Littlehampton Book Services Ltd, ISBN 9780297779032
- 1981 – Odyssey: Mirror on the Mediterranean, Harpercollins, ISBN 9780060148799
- 1983 – The Gods of Greece, Roloff Beny and Arianna Stassinopoulos, Harry N. Abrams
- 1984 – Rajasthan, Land of Kings, McClelland & Stewart, ISBN 9780771012013 (Beny died while this book was in publication.)
- 1985 – The Romance of Architecture, H.N. Abrams, ISBN 9780810915893 (posthumous)
- 1985 – Iceland, McClelland & Stewart, ISBN 9780771011900 (posthumous)
- 1994 – Visual Journeys, Roloff Beny, Mitchell Crites and Michael Crites, Thames & Hudson, ISBN 9780500974148 (posthumous)
- 1995 – People, Legends in Life and Art, Roloff Beny, Mitchell Crites and Jack McClelland, Thames & Hudson, ISBN 9780500974261 (posthumous)

== Awards ==
His books won awards throughout a long career, beginning with The Thrones of Earth and Heaven in 1958. To Every Thing There is a Season: Roloff Beny in Canada is a study of his native land. In 1972 he was made an Officer of the Order of Canada. He was a member of the Royal Canadian Academy of Arts.
