= French ship Alexandre (1857) =

Ship of the line of the French Navy

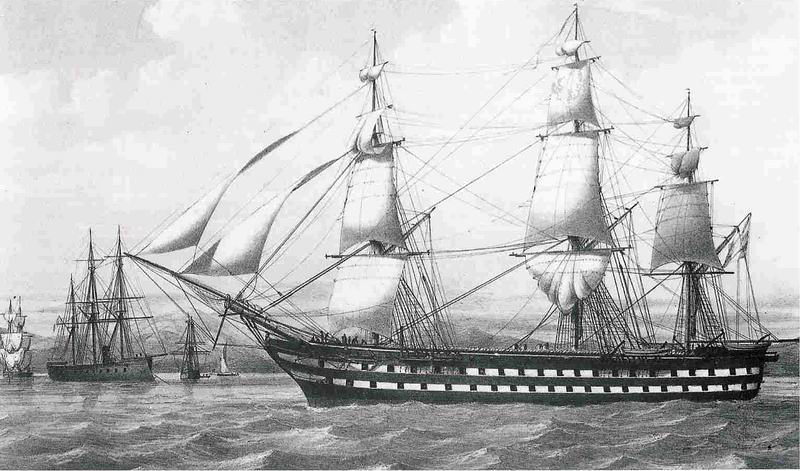
- Portrait by François Roux of Alexandre as a gunnery school ship after 1873

History

Second French Empire
- Name: Alexandre
- Namesake: Alexander the Great
- Ordered: As sailing ship, re-ordered 19 October 1854 as steam-powered ship
- Builder: Arsenal de Rochefort
- Laid down: 30 May 1848
- Launched: 27 March 1857
- Commissioned: 1 September 1857
- Reclassified: As school ship, 28 May 1872; As barracks ship, 22 February 1877
- Stricken: 22 February 1877
- Fate: Scrapped, 1900

General characteristics
- Class & type: Suffren-class ship of the line
- Displacement: 5,292 tonnes
- Length: 72.03 m (236 ft 4 in) (waterline)
- Beam: 16.25 m (53 ft 4 in)
- Draught: 8.1 m (26 ft 7 in) (full load)
- Depth of hold: 8.05 m (26 ft 5 in)
- Installed power: 3,600 PS (2,600 kW)
- Propulsion: 2 steam engines
- Sail plan: Ship rigged
- Complement: 913
- Armament: Lower gundeck: 18 × 36 pdr cannon; 16 × 223.3 mm (8.8 in) Paixhans guns; Upper gundeck: 34 × 30 pdr cannon; Quarterdeck and forecastle: 20 × 30 pdr cannon; 2 × 163 mm (6.4 in) rifled muzzle-loading guns

Alexandre was ordered as a third-rank, 90-gun sailing Suffren-class ship of the line for the French Navy, but was converted to a steam-powered ship in the 1850s while under construction. Completed in 1857 the ship participated in the Second Italian War of Independence two years later. Her engines were removed in 1871 and she began conversion into a transport for exiled prisoners. Alexandre was instead completed as a gunnery training ship in 1872. She was hulked in 1877 and served as a barracks ship until she was scrapped in 1900.

== Description ==
The Suffren-class ships were enlarged versions of the 80-gun Bucentaure-class ships of the line that had been designed by naval architect Jacques-Noël Sané. The conversion to steam power involved cutting the ship's frame in half amidships and building a new section to house the propulsion machinery and coal bunkers, which reduced her armament to 90 guns. Alexandre had a length at the waterline of 72.03 meters (236 ft 4 in), a beam of 16.25 meters (53 ft 4 in) and a depth of hold of 8.05 meters (26 ft 5 in). The ship displaced 5,292 tonnes and had a draught of 8.1 meters (26 ft 7 in) at deep load. Her crew numbered 913 officers and ratings. Details are lacking on the ship's propulsion machinery, the only information available is that her two steam engines were rated at 900 nominal horsepower and produced 3,600 metric horsepower (2,600 kW).

The ship's consisted of eighteen 36-pounder (174.8 mm (6.9 in)) smoothbore cannon and sixteen 223.3 mm (8.8 in) Paixhans guns on the lower gundeck and thirty-four 30-pounder 164.7 mm (6.5 in) cannon on the upper gundeck. On the quarterdeck and forecastle were twenty 30-pounder cannon and a pair of 163 mm (6.4 in) rifled muzzle-loading guns.

== Construction and career ==
Alexandre was one of the three ships of the second batch of Suffren-class ships of the line. She was laid down at the Arsenal de Rochefort on 30 May 1848 and was ordered to be converted to steam power on 19 October 1854. The conversion began on 28 April 1856 and the ship was launched on 23 March 1857. Alexandre was commissioned on 1 March although her sea trials did not begin until 14 April 1858. She was used as a hulk in Toulon from 1877, and broken up in 1900.
