= Attalus (general) =

Ancient Macedonian general

General Attalus
- Ἄτταλος
- Born: 390 BC; Lower Macedonia
- Died: 336 BC (aged 53-54 years old)
- Relatives: Cleopatra Eurydice (niece), Parmenion
- Military career
- Allegiance: Macedonia
- Rank: General (Strategos)

Attalus (Greek: Ἄτταλος; c. 390 BC – 336 BC), a Macedonian from Lower Macedonia, was an important courtier and soldier of Philip II of Macedonia.

== Family connections to Philip II of Macedon ==
Attalus was born in Lower Macedonia in 390 BC.

In 338 BC, Attalus's adopted niece Cleopatra Eurydice married king Philip II of Macedonia. It is said that at the wedding, Attalus made a prayer that Cleopatra might give birth to a legitimate male heir to Philip. This was seen as a direct insult to Alexander the Great.

In the spring of 336 BC, Philip II appointed Attalus and Parmenion as commanders of the advance force that would invade the Persian Empire in Asia Minor.

== Revenge-rape of Pausanias of Orestis ==
According to a story of Aristotle's, lengthened by Cleitarchus and Diodorus Siculus, Attalus sexually assaulted Pausanias of Orestis in retribution for besmirching the reputation of Attalus's friend (possibly relation), also named Pausanias, an event that led to the death of Pausanias, the beloved of Philip, while attempting to prove his honour after public humiliation by Pausanias of Orestis.

Philip II of Macedon's later assassination by Pausanias of Orestis has been tied to this affair as Pausanias of Orestis was upset that Phillip had not punished Attalus.

== Execution by Alexander ==
After Philip II had been assassinated and Alexander became king (October 336 BC), his adopted niece Cleopatra Eurydice and her two children were all killed (Cleopatra Eurydice may have died by her own hand after the murders of her children).

At the time of the assassination of Phillip and accession of Alexander the Great to the Macedonian throne, Attalus was stationed with Parmenion and the Macedonian advance army in Asia Minor. In the wake of Phillip II's death, it is alleged by hostile sources that Demosthenes of Athens wrote a letter to Attalus promising Athens' support if the two made war on Alexander. Attalus submitted Demosthenes' letters to Alexander and pledged his support to the king.

Despite Attalus attempting to appease him, Alexander had sent an officer to Asia Minor to either kill or arrest Attalus. Even without the resentment between the two men that had occurred after the marriage of Cleopatra Eurydice, Alexander probably felt Attalus was too ambitious and popular with the Asian forces to remain alive, and would have good reason for revenge after the deaths of Cleopatra Eurydice and her children. Attalus was executed in 336 BC.

== In popular media ==
- In the 1956 Richard Burton film Alexander the Great, he was played by Stanley Baker.
- In the 1990 and 1991 historical fiction books Lion of Macedon and Dark Prince by David Gemmell. Attalus is portrayed as an assassin, swordsman and later general of Philip II of Macedonia.
- In the 2004 film Alexander, Attalus was portrayed by actor Nick Dunning.
- In the 2024 Netflix miniseries Alexander: The Making of a God, Attalus was portrayed by actor James Oliver Wheatley.
