= Olympias =

Mother of Alexander the Great (c. 375–316 BC)

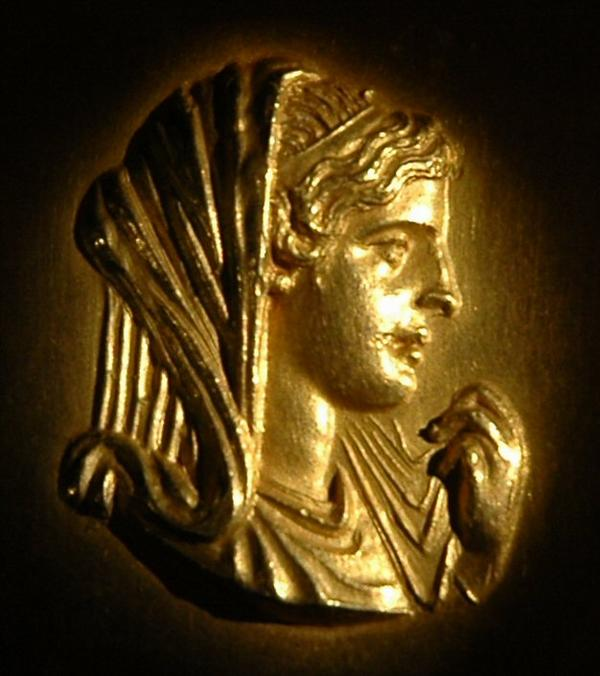
- Roman medallion with Olympias, Museum of Thessaloniki

Queen of Macedon
- Tenure: c. 357–316 BC
- Born: 375 BC; Molossia, Epirus, Ancient Greece
- Died: 316 BC (aged 59); Macedonia, Ancient Greece
- Spouse: Philip II of Macedon
- Issue: Alexander the Great; Cleopatra of Macedon
- Ancient Greek: Ολυμπιάς
- House: Molossians
- Father: Neoptolemus I of Epirus
- Religion: Ancient Greek religion

Olympias (Ancient Greek: Ὀλυμπιάς; c. 375–316 BC) was an ancient Greek princess of the Molossians, the eldest daughter of King Neoptolemus I of Epirus, and the sister of Alexander I of Epirus. She was the mother of Alexander the Great by Philip II, king of Macedonia. She was extremely influential in Alexander's life and was recognized as de facto leader of Macedon during his conquests.

After Alexander the Great's death, conflict broke out over who would inherit the empire. Olympias fought on behalf of her grandson Alexander IV; she defeated Adea Eurydice, and Alexander IV was included in the line of succession. However, she was eventually defeated by Cassander and executed, and Alexander IV was assassinated before wielding any power.

== Origin ==
Olympias was born around 375 BC (no later than 371 BC) probably in Passaron, in modern Epirus, Greece. She was the eldest daughter of Neoptolemus I, king of the Molossians, an ancient Greek tribe of Epirus. She had a brother, Alexander I of Epirus, and a sister, Troas, who married their paternal uncle Arrybas of Epirus. Although unknown, some scholars have theorized that Olympias' mother may have been a Chaonian princess, based on the rumour that Olympias used to say that she was also a descendant of the Trojan prince, Helenus, son of Priam (the last king of Troy), and Andromache, wife of Hector.

Her family belonged to the Aeacidae, a well-respected family of Epirus, which claimed descent from Neoptolemus, son of Achilles. They took their name from the mythical king Aeacus, who ruled in the island of Aegina in the Saronic Gulf. The Aeacidae were perhaps the only Epirotes who were universally recognised as Greek.

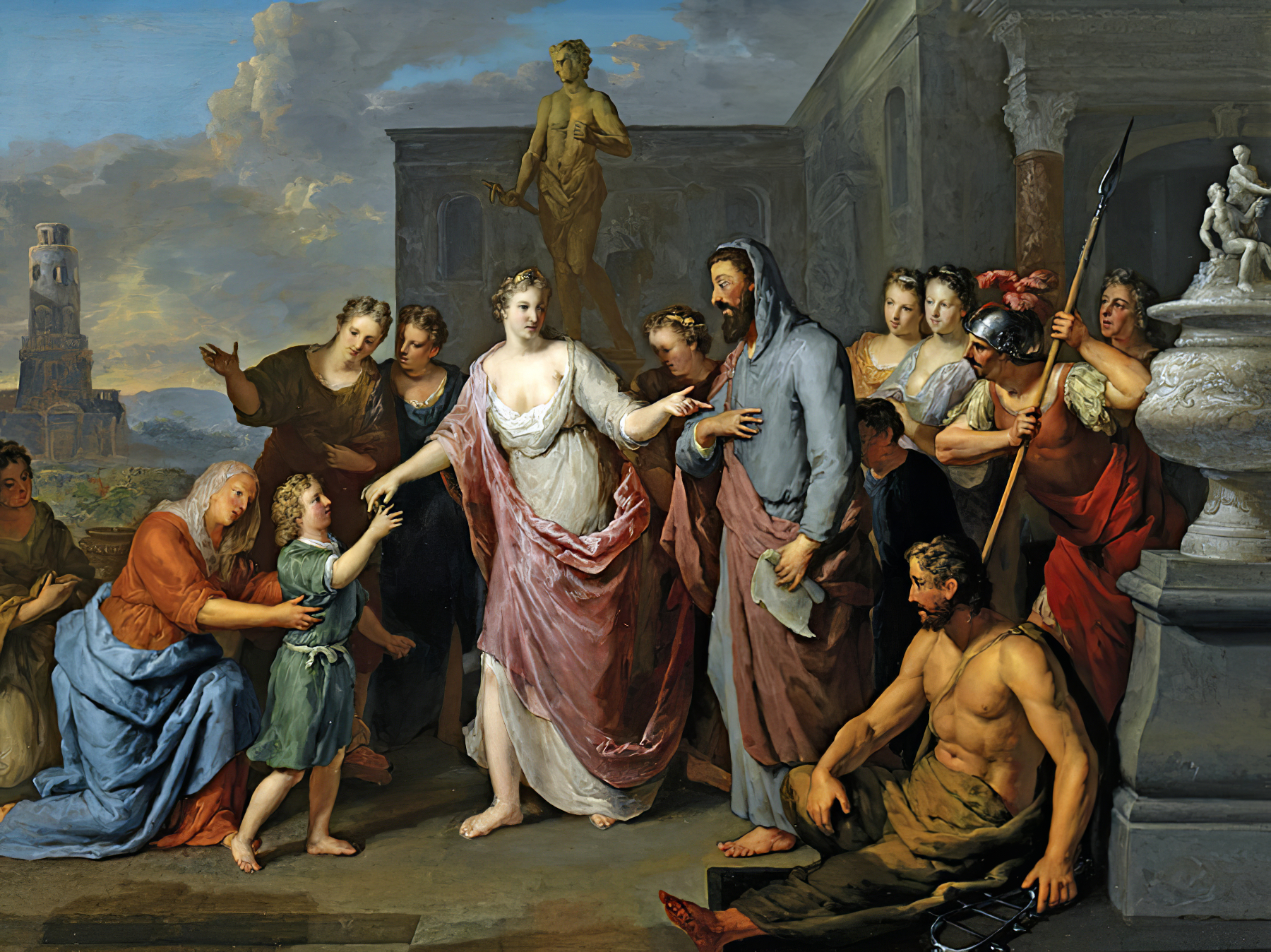
Olympias presenting the young Alexander the Great to Aristotle, by Gerard Hoet, 1733

Apparently, she was originally named Polyxena, as Plutarch mentions in his work Moralia, and changed her name to Myrtale prior to her marriage to Philip II of Macedon as part of her initiation into an unknown mystery cult. Plutarch additionally claimed that she was a devout member of the orgiastic snake-worshiping cult of Dionysus, and he suggested that she slept with snakes in her bed. The name Olympias was the third of four names by which she was known. She probably took it as a recognition of Philip's victory in the Olympic Games of 356 BC, the news of which coincided with Alexander's birth (Plut. Alexander 3.8). She was finally named Stratonice, which was probably an epithet attached to Olympias following her victory over Eurydice in 317 BC.

== Queen of Macedonia ==
When Neoptolemus I died in 360 BC, his brother Arybbas succeeded him on the Molossian throne. In 358 BC, Arybbas made a treaty with the new king of Macedonia, Philip II, and the Molossians became allies of the Macedonians. The alliance was cemented with a diplomatic marriage between Arybbas' niece, Olympias, and Philip in 357 BC. Olympias therefore became queen consort of Macedonia, and Philip the king. While their marriage was largely political in nature to seal the alliance between Macedonia and Epirus, Plutarch alleged that Philip had fallen in love with Olympias when both were initiated into the mysteries of Cabeiri at the Sanctuary of the Great Gods, on the island of Samothrace.

One year later, in 356 BC, Philip's race horse won in the Olympic Games; for this victory, his wife, who was known then as Myrtale, received the name Olympias. In the summer of the same year, Olympias gave birth to her first child, Alexander. In ancient Greece people believed that the birth of a great man was accompanied by portents. As Plutarch describes, the night before the consummation of their marriage, Olympias dreamed that a thunderbolt fell upon her womb and a great fire was kindled, its flames dispersed all about and then were extinguished. After the marriage, Philip dreamed that he put a seal upon his wife's womb, the device of which was the figure of a lion. Aristander's interpretation was that Olympias was pregnant of a son whose nature would be bold and lion-like. Philip and Olympias also had a daughter, Cleopatra, who later married her uncle, Alexander I of Epirus, to further diplomatic ties between Macedonia and Epirus.

According to primary sources, their marriage was very stormy due to Philip's volatility and Olympias' ambition and jealousy, which led to their growing estrangement. Things got more tumultuous in 337 BC, when Philip married a noble Macedonian woman, Cleopatra, the niece of Attalus, who was given the name Eurydice by Philip. At a gathering after the marriage, Philip failed to defend Alexander's claim to the Macedonian throne when Attalus threatened his legitimacy, causing great tensions between Philip, Olympias, and Alexander. Olympias went into voluntary exile in Epirus along with Alexander, staying at the Molossian court of her brother Alexander I, who was the king at the time.

In 336 BC, Philip cemented his ties to Alexander I of Epirus by offering him the hand of his and Olympias' daughter Cleopatra in marriage, which led Olympias to further retreat into isolation as she could no longer count on her brother's support. However, when Philip was murdered by Pausanias, a member of his somatophylakes, while attending the wedding, Olympias, who had returned to Macedonia, was suspected of having countenanced his assassination.

== Alexander's reign and the Wars of the Diadochi ==
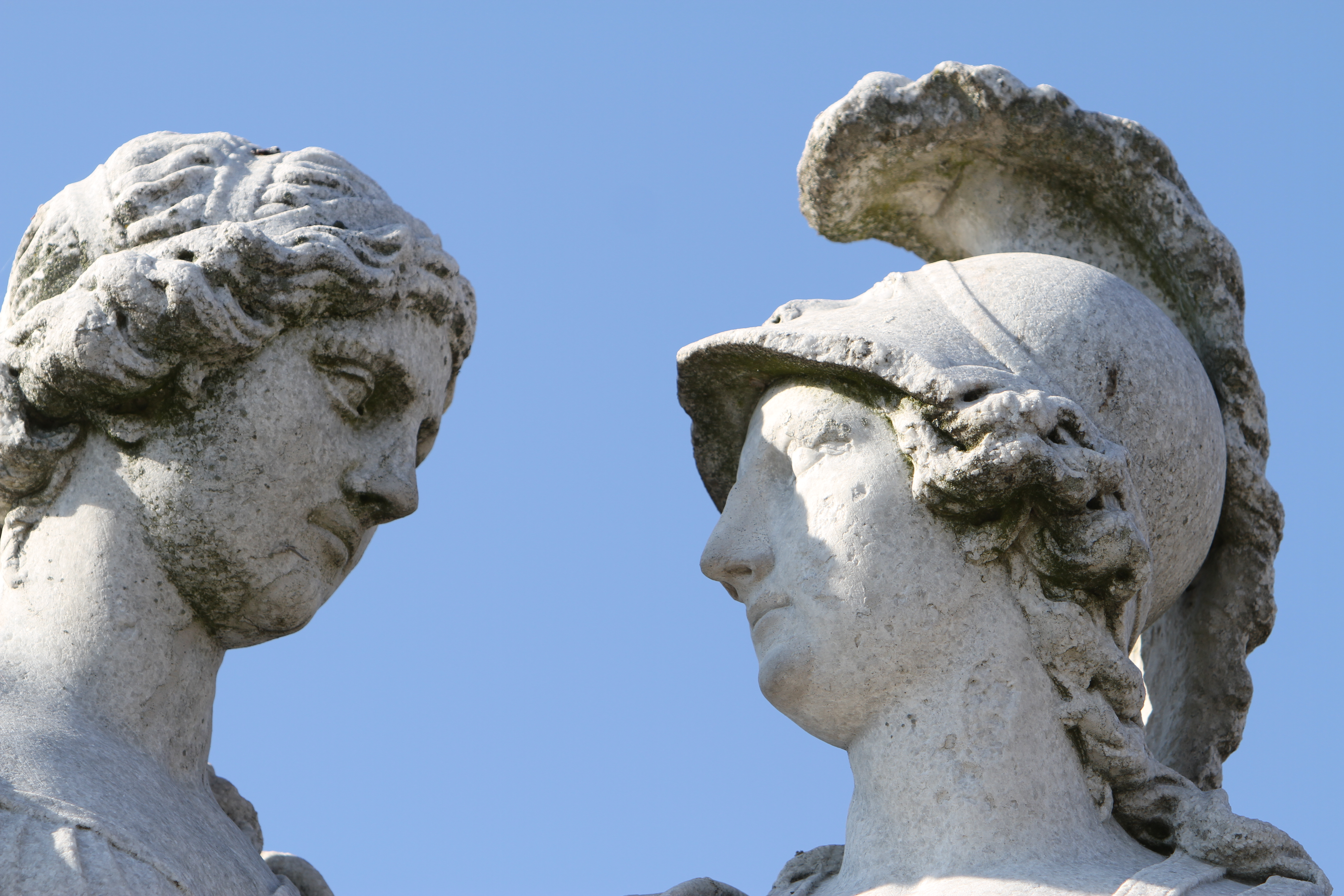
Statue of Alexander and Olympias at Schönbrunn Palace

After the death of Philip II, which Olympias was believed to have either ordered or been an accessory to according to some ancient historical accounts, Olympias was allegedly also involved in overseeing the execution of Eurydice and her child in order to secure Alexander's position as the rightful king of Macedonia. During Alexander's campaigns, she regularly corresponded with him and may have confirmed her son's claim in Egypt by proposing that his father was Zeus, not Phillip. The relationship between Olympias and Alexander was cordial, but her son tried to keep her away from politics. However, she wielded great influence in Macedonia and caused troubles for Antipater, the regent of the kingdom. In 330 BC, she returned to Epirus and served as a regent to her cousin Aeacides in the Epirote state, as her brother Alexander I had died during a campaign in southern Italy.

After Alexander the Great's death in Babylon in 323 BC, his wife Roxana gave birth to their son named Alexander IV. Alexander IV and his uncle Philip III Arrhidaeus, the half brother of Alexander the Great who may have been disabled, were subject to the regency of Perdiccas, who tried to strengthen his position through a marriage with Antipater's daughter Nicaea. At the same time, Olympias offered Perdiccas the hand of her and Philip's daughter, Cleopatra. Perdiccas chose Cleopatra, which angered Antipater, who allied himself with several other Diadochi, deposed Perdiccas, and was declared regent, only to die within the year.

Polyperchon succeeded Antipater in 319 BC as regent, but Antipater's son Cassander established Philip II's son Philip III (Arrhidaeus) as king and forced Polyperchon out of Macedonia. He fled to Epirus, taking Roxana and her son Alexander IV with him, who had previously been left in the care of Olympias. At the beginning, Olympias had not been involved in this conflict, but she soon realized that in the case of Cassander's rule, her grandson would lose the crown, so she allied with Polyperchon in 317 BC. The Macedonian soldiers supported her return and the united armies of Polyperchon and Olympias, with the house of Aeacides, invaded Macedonia to drive Cassander out from power.

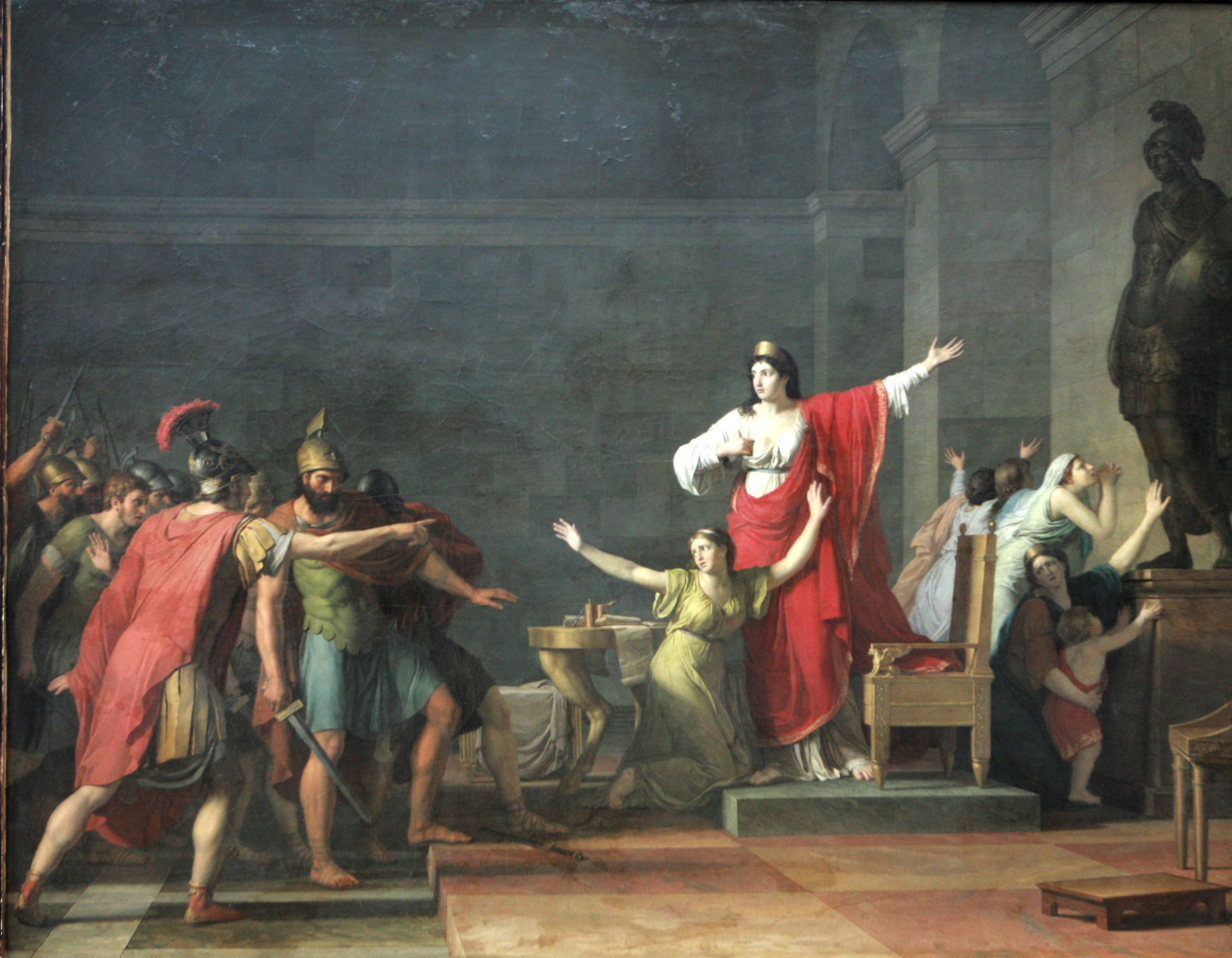
Cassander ordering the death of Olympias by Jean-Joseph Taillasson, ca. 1799.

After winning in battle by convincing the army of Adea Eurydice, the wife of Philip III, to side with her own, Olympias captured and executed the pair in October 317 BC. She also captured Cassander's brother and a hundred of his partisans. Cassander soon blockaded and besieged Olympias in Pydna and one of the terms of the capitulation had been that Olympias's life would be saved, but Cassander had decided to execute her, only temporarily sparing the lives of Roxana and Alexander IV (they were executed a few years later in 309 BC). When the fortress of Pydna fell, Cassander ordered Olympias killed, but the soldiers refused to harm the mother of Alexander the Great. There are differing stories about her death. Pausanias states that she was stoned to death by the families of her many victims. Justinus says she went out to meet her enemies in royal attire with two maids and forced them to stab her publicly, "so that you could see Alexander even in his dying mother." Cassander is also said to have denied to her body the rites of burial.

== Iconography ==
A medal bearing the name "Olympias" was found in 1902 at Abu Qir, Egypt that dates back to AD 225–250, and belongs to the Archaeological Museum of Thessaloniki. The reverse shows a Nereid mounted on a fantastic sea creature. It had been suggested that the Olympias depicted on the medal was Queen Olympias, but this theory has been challenged. The name ΟΛΥΜΠΙΑΔΟΣ is thought to refer to the Olympiads instead.

== In popular culture ==
- Olympias was portrayed by French actress Danielle Darrieux in the 1956 film Alexander the Great, a historical epic which starred Richard Burton as Alexander and Fredric March as his father.
- Olympias appears in Maurice Druon's 1960 novel Alexander the God.
- Olympias is a character in The Young Alexander the Great (1960) by Naomi Mitchison.
- Olympias appears in The Conqueror (1962) by Edison Marshall.
- Olympias is a character in Aubrey Menen's A Conspiracy of Women (1965).
- Olympias is a major character in two of the three novels of Mary Renault's acclaimed Alexander Trilogy, Fire from Heaven (1969) and Funeral Games (1981). Olympias is frequently referenced in the second novel of the trilogy, The Persian Boy (1972).
- Olympias is the subject of Michael A. Dimitri's 1993 novel The Daughter of Neoptolemus.
- Olympias is a character in Valerio Massimo Manfredi's 2001 novel Alexander: Child of a Dream.
- Angelina Jolie starred as Olympias in Oliver Stone's 2004 film Alexander, which co-starred Colin Farrell as Alexander and Val Kilmer as Philip.
- Olympias appears in Empire of Ashes: A Novel of Alexander the Great (2004) by Nicholas Nicastro
- Olympias is a character in The Virtues of War: A Novel of Alexander the Great (2005), by Steven Pressfield, told in the first person by Alexander.
- Olympias is the subject of Judith Tarr's 2008 novel Bring Down the Sun (Alexander the Great #2).
- Olympias appears in the fictional biography of Alexander God of War (2012) by Christian Cameron.
- Olympias also appears in the Indian series Porus, portrayed by Sameksha.
- Olympias (called Myrtale, her earlier name) appears in Jeanne Reames's duology Dancing with the Lion (2019).
- Olympias is also the name of the queen of Macedonia in the manga series Historié by Hitoshi Iwaaki.
- Olympias appears as a character in Horrible Histories in a skit named "Made in Macedonia".
- Olympias appears under the name Petaniqua in Vampire: The Masquerade as one of the Anathema of the Red List

== See also ==
- Alkimachos of Pydna
- Pyrrhus of Epirus
- Dodona
- Aegae (Macedonia)

== Bibliography ==
Primary sources

- Plutarch, Alexander, Parallel Lives, online at Perseus Project.

Secondary sources

- Heckel, Waldemar (2006). Who's who in the age of Alexander the Great: prosopography of Alexander's empire. Wiley-Blackwell. ISBN 1-4051-1210-7.
- Waterfield, Robin (2011). Dividing the Spoils: The War for Alexander the Great's Empire. New York: Oxford University Press. pp. 273 pages. ISBN 9780199647002.
