= Cleopatra Eurydice =

4th-century BC Macedonian queen consort

- Κλεοπάτρα Εὐρυδίκη
- Born: Cleopatra
- Spouse: Philip II (m. c. 337 BC)
- Children: Europa; Caranus
- Relatives: Attalus

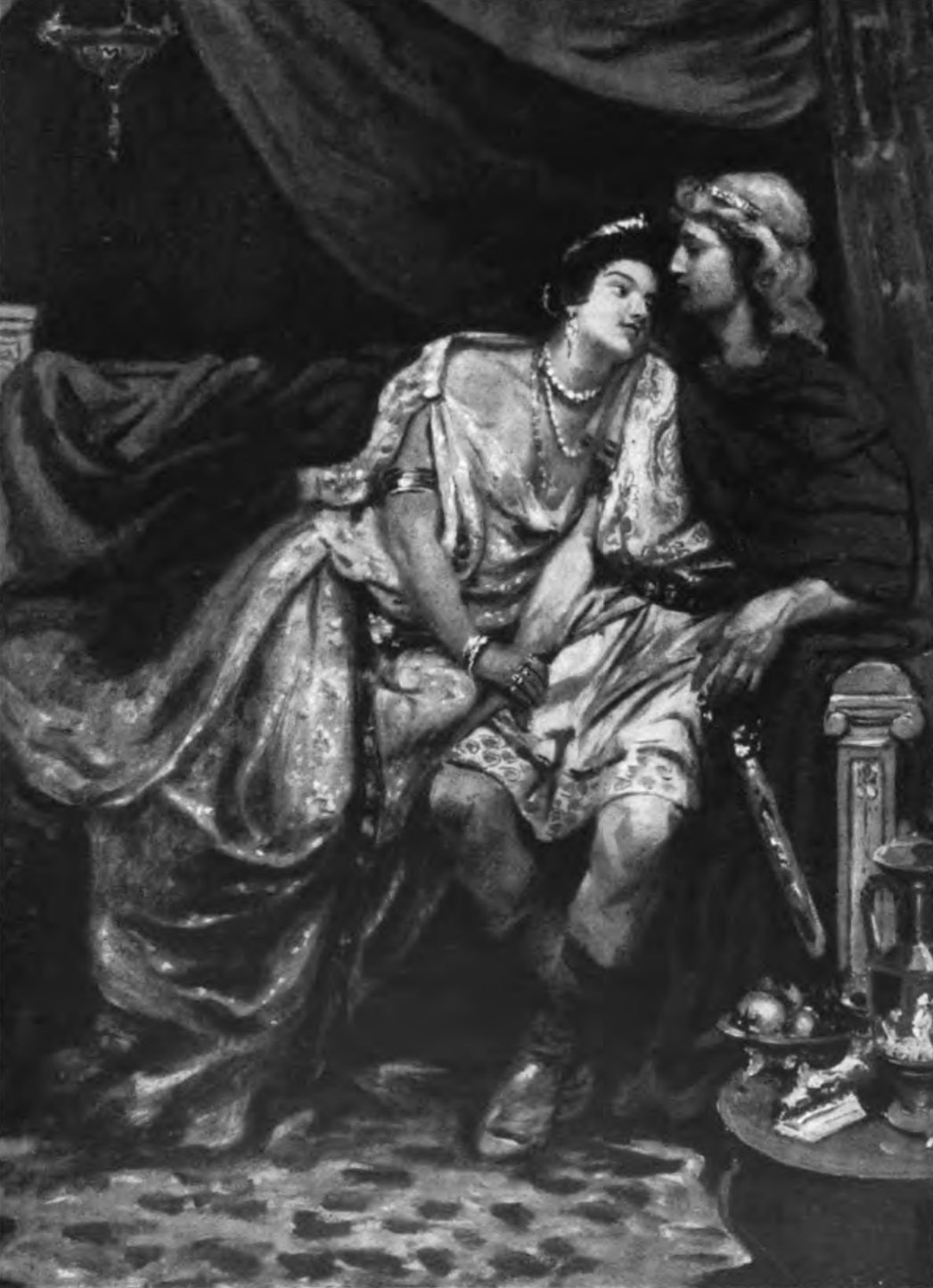
“Cleopatra’s passion” by August Petrtyl, 1913. The image depicts Cleopatra (Euridyce) next to Phillip II of Macedon

Eurydice (Greek: Εὐρυδίκη), born Cleopatra (Greek: Κλεοπάτρα), was a mid-4th-century BC Macedonian noblewoman, niece of Attalus, and last of the seven wives of Philip II of Macedon, but the first Macedonian one.

== Biography ==
Cleopatra was a maiden whom Philip II married either in 338 or 337 BC and was his seventh wife.

Eurydice was significantly younger than her husband but her exact age at the time of her marriage is unknown.

While Cleopatra was Philip II's seventh wife, she was his first Macedonian wife, and was wed as an alliance between the king and his general, Cleopatra's uncle, Attalus. Other sources say the main reason was not simply a political alliance but that Philip had fallen madly in love with the young woman.

As Philip's wife, Cleopatra was given the name "Eurydice". Although Philip was a polygamist, his marriage to Cleopatra greatly upset Olympias, his fourth wife and the mother of Alexander the Great, and threw Alexander's inheritance into question. It was at Eurydice and Philip's wedding banquet that her uncle insulted her stepson Alexander by making a toast to the newlyweds hoping that Cleopatra would give birth to a legitimate male heir to Philip. This was seen as a direct insult to Alexander, and Philip's failure to defend him led Alexander to go into exile.

According to both Justin and Satyrus, Cleopatra Eurydice and Philip produced two children, Europa, a girl, and Caranus, a boy. Following Philip's assassination, both children were murdered by Olympias, whereupon Cleopatra took her own life, or her murder by Olympias was made to look like suicide. An alternate course of events is that Eurydice with her infant daughter Europa in her arms were burned alive by being dragged onto a hot brazen oven on the orders of Olympias.

Peter Green strongly suggests that Alexander ordered the death of Caranus, but that the deaths of Europa and Cleopatra were the result of Olympias's vindictiveness.

Attalus would also be killed in the aftermath of this succession.
