= Battle of the Uxian Defile =

Battle during the wars of Alexander the Great

Uxian Defile
- Part of Wars of Alexander the Great
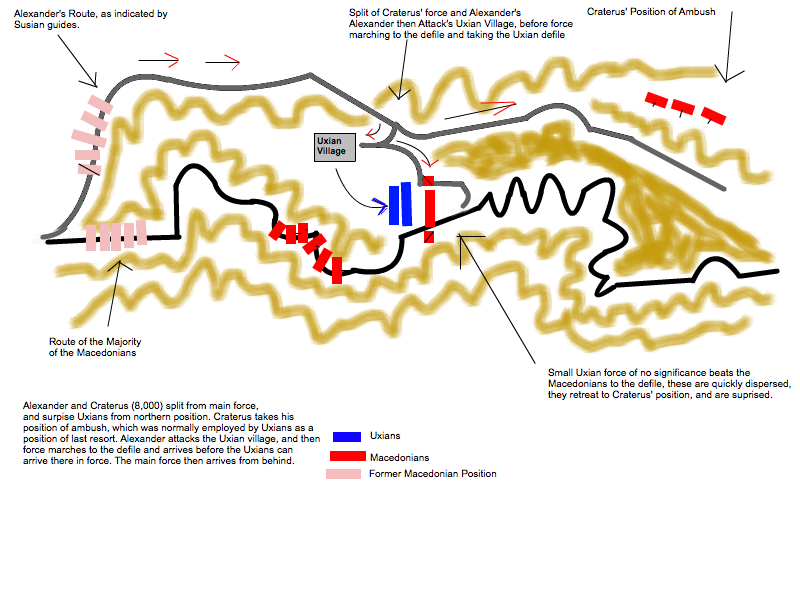
Date	331 BC
Location	East of Susa 32°11′26″N 48°15′2″E
Result	Macedonian victory
Territorial changes	Hellenic conquest of the Uxians

Belligerents
Macedonia; League of Corinth	Uxians

Commanders and leaders
Alexander the Great	Madates

Strength
8,000 infantry	Unknown

Casualties and losses
Minimal–Moderate	Unknown, total destruction of Uxian military capabilities

Alexander the Great
current battle

The Battle of Uxian Defile was fought by Alexander the Great against the Uxian tribe of the Persian Empire. The battle raged on the mountain range between the key Persian cities of Susa and Persepolis. Persepolis was the ancient capital of the Persian Empire and held a symbolic value among the native Persian population. They believed that if this city were to fall into enemy hands, then, in effect, the whole Persian Empire would fall into the hands of the enemy.

== Background ==
Alexander had recently defeated Darius III Codomannus at the Battle of Gaugamela on the eastern side of the Tigris river, the result of which had been a disaster for Darius and the Persian Empire. Darius had prematurely fled the battle, and his army had dispersed. Thus Alexander had been unable to achieve his goal of capturing Darius during the course of the battle. Instead, Alexander chased Darius and, as a result, captured the important cities of the Persian Empire along the way.

Immediately after the battle, Alexander feared that the Persians would organise the defence of Babylon, which had thick walls. This city's walls covered a vast area, which included a large area of farm land, and could therefore hold out almost indefinitely against a siege. However, instead of finding the city closed to him, he found that it was open to him. The Persian satrap Mazaeus decided to capitalise on Alexander's famed generosity and let him into the city. It was as a result of this that Mazaeus was appointed satrap of this city and surrounding region, a lucrative post. It was Alexander's practice to, as much as possible, leave the old governors in their positions - a practice he had learned from Cyrus the Great.

Alexander rested his troops in Babylon for some days, and paid them amply with the treasures that were found there. In addition, he decided to set it up as a secondary base. From here Alexander set out for Susa, the winter capital of the Persian Empire. It took him twenty days to reach Susa, from where he obtained 50,000 gold talents. It was as a result of this that Alexander was able to send Antipater, the regent of Macedon, 3,000 gold talents for the war against Sparta. From Susa, Alexander marched towards the mountain defile.

Normally, the tribes in the Persian Empire would pay tribute to the Great King, but the Persians had been unable to subdue the Uxians. As a result, whenever Persian armies wanted to use the pass for logistical purposes, they were required to pay a fee. The Uxians had sent Alexander an embassy to the effect that they expected him to pay the same tribute the Persians were required to. Alexander agreed, saying that on a given day he would follow the main road and pay the agreed upon tribute.

== Battle ==
The Uxians had expected him to travel by the main road to pay the tribute before they let him pass. However, on that day, Alexander, with Craterus and his shield bearing guards, and 8,000 other soldiers passed by the northern road, Craterus occupying the high ground where it was assumed the Uxians would retreat as a means of last resort. He then attacked their village. After having done so, by a series of forced marches, he took the defile from the Uxians, who then retreated to Craterus' position, who quickly dispatched them.

After having attacked the village and taken the village, the main force arrived behind the Uxians. At this point the battle was over, the Uxians were entirely surrounded by the Macedonians, who put them to the sword.

== Results ==
The surviving Uxians sued for peace. The agreed upon terms were that each year the Uxians were to give to the Macedonians 100 horses, 500 head of cattle and 30,000 sheep.
