= Wars of Alexander the Great =

Conflicts of Alexander the Great (336–325 BC)

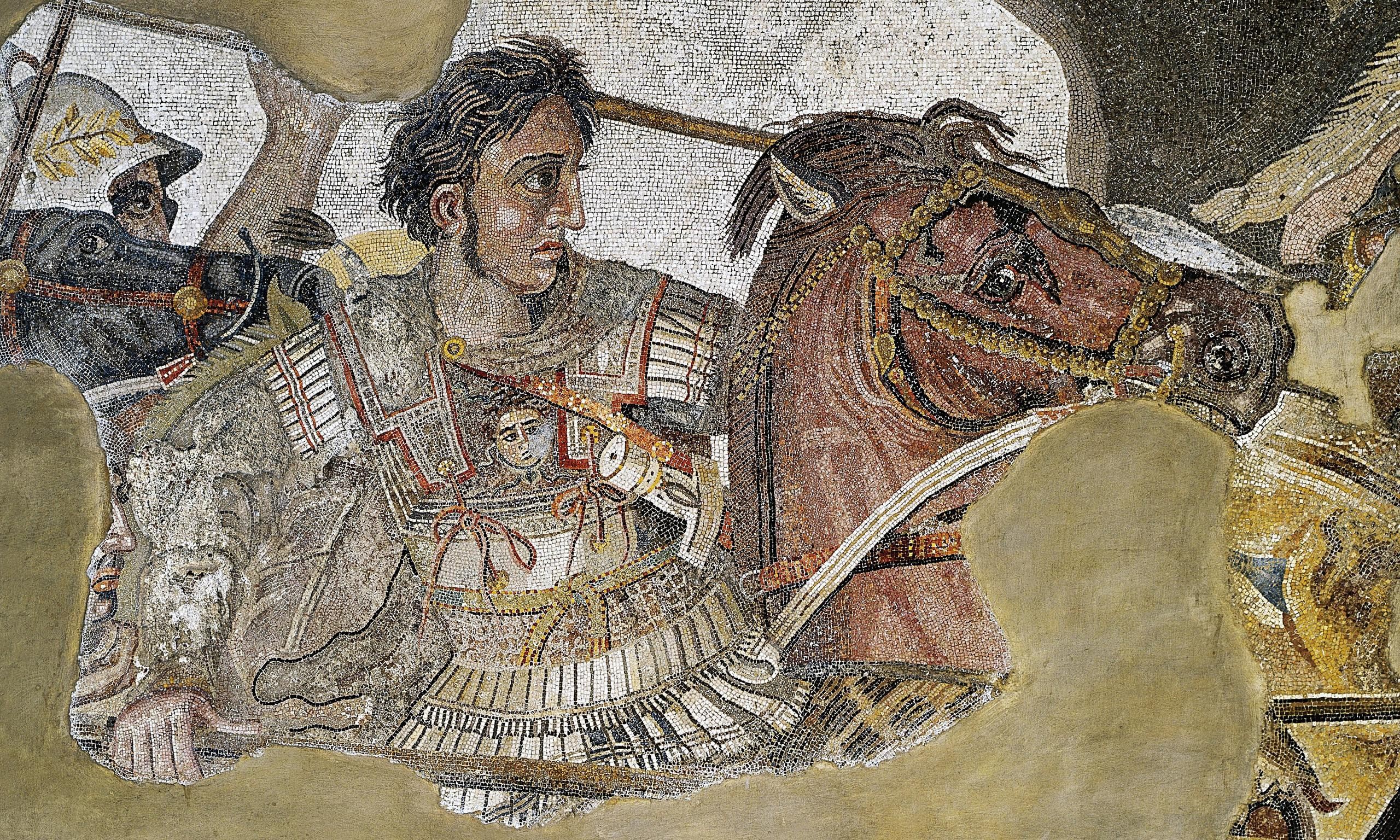
- Alexander, depicted with his horse Bucephalus, fighting Persian king Darius III, from the Alexander Mosaic of Pompeii (Naples National Archaeological Museum, Italy)
Date	336–323 BC (13 years)
Location	Greece, Illyria, Thrace, Danube Delta, Anatolia, Syria, Phoenicia (Palestine), Egypt, Mesopotamia, Persia, Afghanistan, Sogdia, Bactria, India
Result	Macedonian victory
Territorial changes	Macedonian Empire spans from the Balkans and Egypt in the west to Central Asia and India in the east; Beginning of the Hellenistic period

Belligerents
Macedonian Empire; • Hellenic League; Gandhara	Achaemenid Empire; Balkans: Illyrians; Thracians; Polis; Western and Central Asia: Bactria; Sogdia; Uxiians; India: Pauravas; Aśvaka; Guraens; Mallians; Oxydracians; Amvastha

Commanders and leaders
Alexander the Great (WIA); Parmenion X; Antipater; Craterus (WIA); Cleitus X; Coenus #; Seleucus; Nearchus; Hephaestion #; Peithon; Eumenes; Ariston; Simmias; Nicanor #; Ptolemy (WIA); Perdiccas; Philotas (executed); Taxiles	Darius III X; Bessus (executed); Memnon #; Batis (executed); Ariobarzanes †; Arsames †; Dimitriadis; Spithridates †; Rheomithres †; Niphates †; Petenes †; Mithrobuzanes †; Arbupales †; Mithridates †; Pharnaces †; Omares †; Orontobates; Mazaeus #; Azemilcus (surrendered); Hegesistratus; Spitamenes X; Porus; Glaucius

Casualties and losses
- More than 1 million

Alexander the Great of Macedon carried out a series of conquests and military campaigns from 336 to 323 BC. They began with his conquest of the Achaemenid Empire, which was ruled by Darius III. After a series of victories over the Persians and the defeat of Darius, he began a campaign against local chieftains and warlords that stretched from Greece to as far as the Indus Valley. At the time of his death, Alexander ruled over most regions of Greece and the conquered Achaemenid Empire, including much of Achaemenid Egypt.

Despite his military accomplishments, Alexander did not establish a stable empire, and his untimely death threw the vast territories he conquered into a series of civil wars known as the Wars of the Diadochi.

Alexander ascended to the throne of Macedon following the assassination of his father, Philip II (r. 359–336 BC). During his two decade reign, Philip II had unified the poleis or Greek city-states of mainland Greece under the Macedonian led League of Corinth. Alexander proceeded to solidify Macedonian rule by quashing a rebellion by the Greek city-states in the south and staged a short but bloody excursion against the city-states to the north. He then proceeded east to carry out his plans to conquer the Achaemenid Empire. His campaign of conquests which began in Greece spanned across Anatolia, Syria, Phoenicia, Egypt, Mesopotamia, Greater Iran, Afghanistan, and India. The borders of his Macedonian Empire extended as far east as the city of Taxila in modern-day Pakistan.

Prior to his death, Alexander had also made plans for a Macedonian military and mercantile expedition into the Arabian Peninsula, after which he planned to turn west to Carthage. However, with Alexander's death, his generals, the Diadochi abandoned these plans and within a few years, began fighting against each other dividing the territories of the Macedonian Empire among themselves, these wars lasted for 40 years and took place during the Hellenistic period.

== Historical campaigns ==
=== Background ===
The Kingdom of Macedon in 336 BC

In 336 BC, Philip II was assassinated by the captain of his bodyguards, Pausanias of Orestis. Philip's son, and previously designated heir, Alexander, was proclaimed king by the Macedonian noblemen and army. He also succeeded his father as head of the League of Corinth, a confederation of Greek states that were under the hegemony of Macedonia in order to combat the Achaemenid Empire.

News of Philip's death roused many states into revolt, including Thebes, Athens, Thessaly, as well as the Thracian tribes to the north of Macedon. When news of the revolt reached Alexander, he took quick action. Although his advisers recommended the use of diplomacy, Alexander ignored the advice and instead proceeded to gather his Macedonian cavalry of 3,000 men. Together, the army rode south towards Thessaly (Macedon's immediate neighbor to the south). When he found the Thessalian army blocking the pass between Mount Olympus and Mount Ossa, he had his men ride over Mount Ossa. When the Thessalians awoke, they found Alexander at their rear. The Thessalians quickly surrendered, and their cavalry was added to Alexander's force. He then proceeded south, towards the Peloponnese.

Alexander stopped at Thermopylae, where he was recognized as the leader of the Sacred League before heading south to Corinth. Athens sued for peace and Alexander received the envoy and pardoned anyone involved with the uprising. At Corinth, he was given the title 'Hegemon' of the Greek forces against the Persians. Whilst at Corinth, he heard the news of a Thracian uprising in the north.

=== Balkan campaign ===
Before crossing to Asia, Alexander wanted to safeguard his northern borders and, in the spring of 335 BC, he advanced into Thrace to deal with the revolt, which was led by the Illyrians and Triballi. At Mount Haemus, the Macedonian army attacked and defeated a Thracian garrison manning the heights. The Macedonians were then attacked in the rear by the Triballi, who were crushed in turn. Alexander then advanced on to the Danube, encountering the Getae tribe on the opposite shore. The Getae army retreated after the first cavalry skirmish, leaving their town to the Macedonian army. News then reached Alexander that Cleitus, King of Illyria, and King Glaukias of the Taulantii were in open revolt against Macedonian authority. Alexander defeated each in turn, forcing Cleitus and Glaukias to flee with their armies, leaving Alexander's northern frontier secure.

While he was triumphantly campaigning north, the Thebans and Athenians rebelled once more. Alexander reacted immediately, but, while the other cities once again hesitated, Thebes decided to resist with the utmost vigor. This resistance was useless, however, as the city was razed to the ground amid great bloodshed and its territory divided between the other Boeotian cities. The end of Thebes cowed Athens into submission, leaving all of Greece at least outwardly at peace with Alexander.

=== Persia ===
==== Asia Minor ====
In 334 BC, Alexander crossed the Hellespont into Asia. It took over one hundred triremes (triple-banked galleys) to transport the entire Macedonian army, but the Persians decided to ignore the movement.

In these early months, Darius still refused to take Alexander seriously or mount a serious challenge to Alexander's movements. Memnon of Rhodes, the Greek mercenary who aligned himself with the Persians, advocated for a scorched earth strategy. He wanted the Persians to destroy the land in front of Alexander, which he hoped would force Alexander's army to starve, and then to turn back. The satraps in Anatolia rejected this advice, considering it their duty to defend their land. Eventually, with Alexander advancing deeper into Persian territory, Darius ordered all five satraps of the Anatolian provinces to pool their military resources together and confront Alexander. This army was guided by Memnon, while absolute command was split among the five satraps.

=== Battle of the Granicus River ===
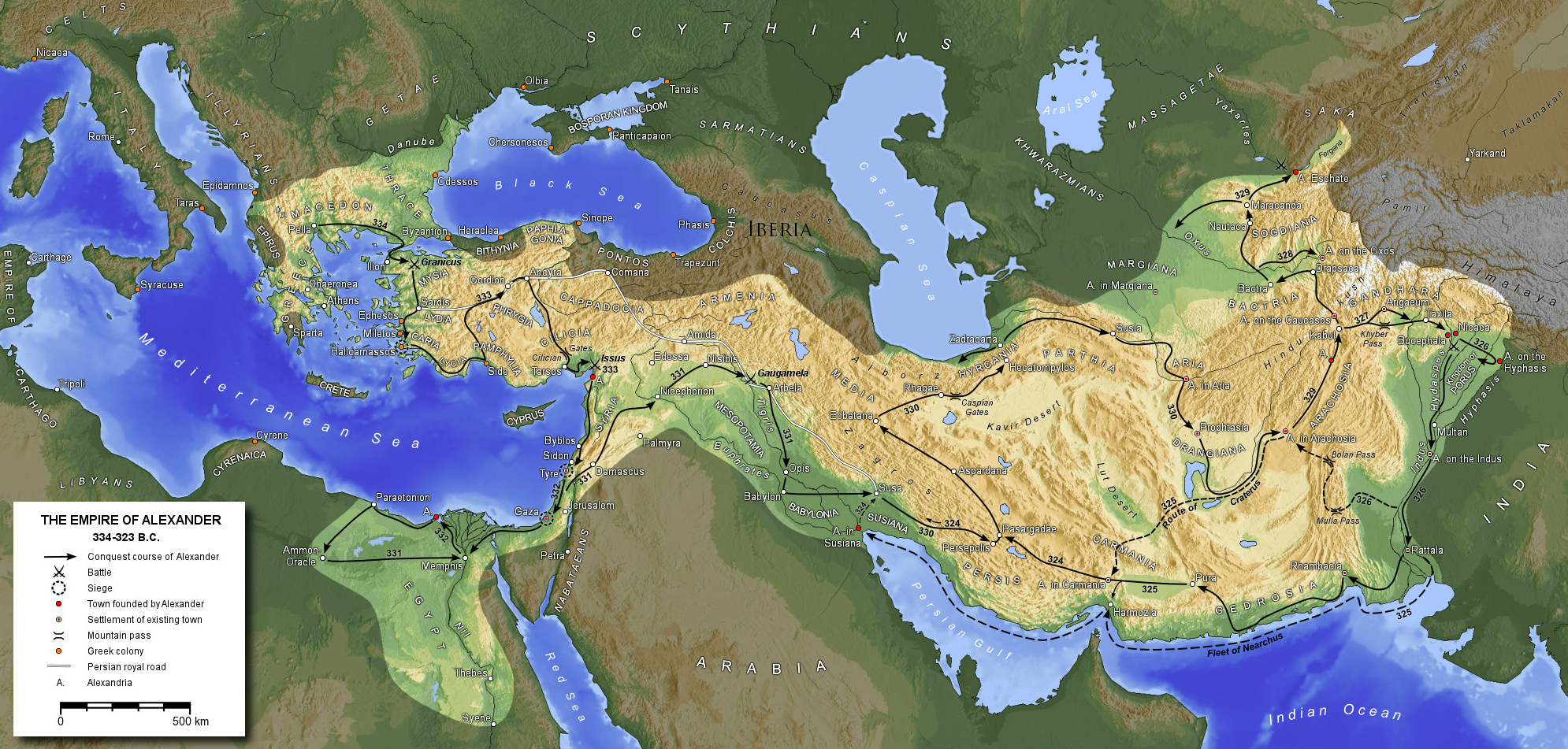
Map of what would become Alexander's empire

The Battle of the Granicus River in May 334 BC was fought in Northwestern Asia Minor (modern-day Turkey), near the site of Troy. After crossing the Hellespont, Alexander advanced up the road to the capital of the Satrapy of Phrygia. The various satraps of the Persian Empire gathered their forces at the town of Zelea and offered battle on the banks of the Granicus River. Alexander ultimately fought many of his battles on a river bank. By doing so, he was able to minimize the advantage the Persians had in numbers. In addition, the deadly Persian chariots were useless on a cramped, muddy river bank.

Arrian, Diodorus, and Plutarch all mention the battle, with Arrian providing the most detail. The Persians placed their cavalry in front of their infantry, and drew up on the right (east) bank of the river. The Macedonian line was arrayed with the heavy Phalanxes in the middle, Macedonian cavalry led by Alexander on the right, and allied Thessalian cavalry led by Parmenion on the left. The Persians expected the main assault to come from Alexander's position and moved units from their center to that flank.

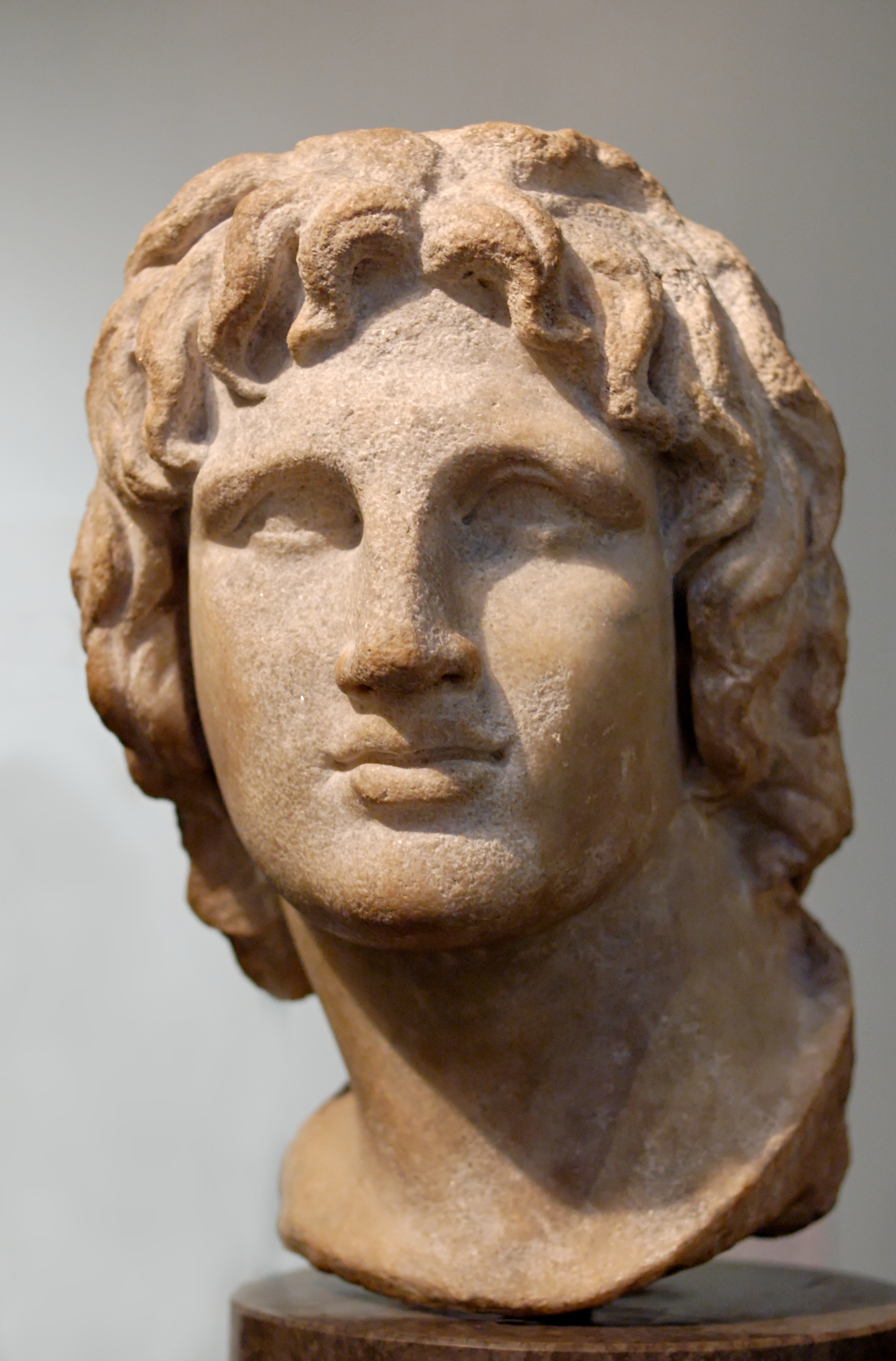
Hellenistic marble bust of Alexander dating from 2nd-1st century BC, possibly from Alexandria, Egypt, now at the British Museum

Alexander's second-in-command, Parmenion, suggested crossing the river upstream and attacking at dawn the next day, but Alexander attacked immediately. He ordered a small group of cavalry and light infantry to attack from the Macedonian right to draw the Persians off the bank and into the river. Seeing that he had broken the Persian line, Alexander led his horse companions in oblique order further to the right in order to outflank the Persians and buy time for his infantry to cross the river. Several high-ranking Persian nobles were killed by Alexander himself or his bodyguards, although Alexander was stunned by an axe-blow from a Persian nobleman named Spithridates. Before the noble could deal a death-blow, however, he was killed by Cleitus the Black. The Macedonian cavalry opened a hole in the Persian line as the Macedonian infantry advanced, forcing the enemy back and eventually breaking their center. The Persian cavalry turned and fled the battlefield, and the Greek mercenary infantry they held in reserve were encircled by the Macedonians and slaughtered; only around two-thousand of which survived, and were sent back to Macedonia for labor.

==== Alexander consolidates support in Asia Minor ====
After the battle, Alexander buried the dead Greeks and Persians and sent the captured Greek mercenaries back to Greece to work in the mines as an abject lesson for any Greek who decided to fight for the Persians. He sent some of the spoils back to Greece, including three hundred panoplies (complete Persian suits of armor) back to Athens to be dedicated in the Parthenon with the inscription "Alexander, son of Philip and the Greeks, Lacedaemonians (Spartans) excepted, these spoils from the barbarians who dwell in Asia".

Antipater, whom Alexander had left in charge of Macedon in his absence, had been given a free hand to install dictators and tyrants wherever he saw fit in order to minimize the risk of a rebellion. As he moved deeper into Persia, however, the threat of trouble seemed to grow. Many of these towns had been ruled for generations by heavy handed tyrants, so in these Persian towns, he did the opposite of what he did in Greece. Wanting to appear to be a liberator, he freed the population and allowed self-government. As he continued marching into Persia, he saw that his victory at Granicus had been lost on no one. Town after town seemed to surrender to him. The satrap at Sardis, as well as his garrison, was among the first of many satraps to capitulate.

As these satraps gave up, Alexander appointed new ones to replace them, and claimed to distrust the accumulation of absolute power into anyone's hands. There appeared to be little change from the old system. Alexander, however, appointed independent boards to collect tribute and taxes from the satrapies, which appeared to do nothing more than improve the efficiency of government. The true effect, however, was to separate the civil from the financial function of these satrapies, thus ensuring that these governments, while technically independent of him, never truly were. Otherwise, he allowed the inhabitants of these towns to continue as they always had, and made no attempt to impose Greek customs on them. Meanwhile, ambassadors from other Greek cities in Asia Minor came to Alexander, offering submission if he allowed their 'democracies' to continue. Alexander granted their wish, and allowed them to stop paying taxes to Persia, but only if they joined the League of Corinth. By doing so, they promised to provide monetary support to Alexander.

==== Siege of Halicarnassus ====
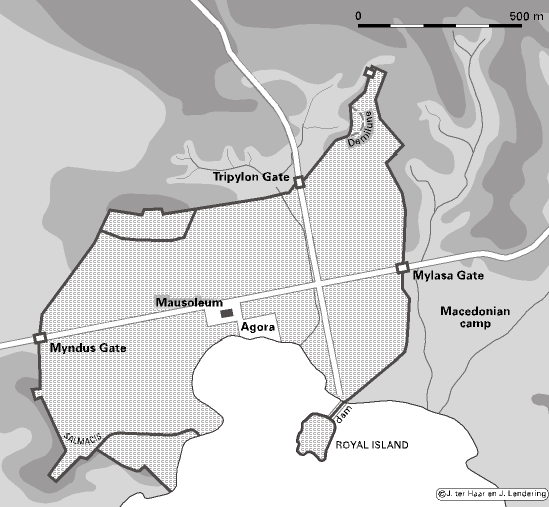
Map of Halicarnassus at the time of the siege

The Siege of Halicarnassus was undertaken in 334 BC. Alexander, who had a weak navy, was constantly being threatened by the Persian navy. It continuously attempted to provoke an engagement with Alexander, who would have none of it. Eventually, the Persian fleet sailed to Halicarnassus, in order to establish a new defense. Ada of Caria, the former queen of Halicarnassus, had been driven from her throne by her usurping brother. When he died, Darius had appointed Orontobates satrap of Caria, which included Halicarnassus in its jurisdiction. On the approach of Alexander in 334 BC, Ada, who was in possession of the fortress of Alinda, surrendered the fortress to him. Alexander and Ada appear to have formed an emotional connection. He called her "mother", finding her more amicable than his megalomaniacal snake-worshiping mother Olympias. In return for his support, Ada gave Alexander gifts, and even sent him some of the best cooks in Asia Minor, realizing that Alexander had a sweet tooth. In the past, Alexander had referred to his biological father, Philip, as his "so-called" father, and preferred to think of the deity Amon Zeus as his actual father. Thus, he had finally managed to divorce himself from both of his biological parents.

Orontobates and Memnon of Rhodes entrenched themselves in Halicarnassus. Alexander had sent spies to meet with dissidents inside the city, who had promised to open the gates and allow Alexander to enter. When his spies arrived, however, the dissidents were nowhere to be found. A small battle resulted, and Alexander's army managed to break through the city walls. Memnon, however, now deployed his catapults, and Alexander's army fell back. Memnon then deployed his infantry, and shortly before Alexander would have received his first (and only) defeat, his infantry managed to break through the city walls, surprising the Persian forces and killing Orontobates. Memnon, realizing the city was lost, set fire to it and withdrew with his army. A strong wind caused the fire to destroy much of the city. Alexander then committed the government of Caria to Ada; and she, in turn, formally adopted Alexander as her son, ensuring that the rule of Caria passed unconditionally to him upon her eventual death.

==== Syria ====
Shortly after the battle, Memnon died. His replacement was a Persian who had spent time in Macedonia called Pharnabazus. He disrupted Alexander's supply routes by taking Aegean islands near the Hellespont and by fomenting rebellion in southern Greece. Meanwhile, Darius took the Persian army to intercept Alexander.

Alexander marched his army east through Cappadocia, where, for a stretch of nearly 150 km (93 mi), there was no water. As his army approached Mount Taurus, they found only one route through which to pass, which was a narrow defile called "The Gates". The defile was very narrow, and could have been easily defended. However, the Persian satrap of Cappadocia had an inflated view of his own abilities. He had been at the Battle of the Granicus River, and had believed that Memnon's scorched Earth strategy would work here. He did not realize that the different circumstances of the terrain made that strategy useless. Had he mounted a credible defence of the defile, Alexander would have been easily repulsed. He left only a small contingent to guard the defile, and took his entire army to destroy the plain that lay ahead of Alexander's army. The Persian contingent that was supposed to guard the defile soon abandoned it, and Alexander passed through without any problems. Alexander supposedly said after this incident that he had never been so lucky in his entire career.

After reaching Mount Taurus, Alexander's army found a stream that flowed from the mountain with water that was ice cold. Not thinking, Alexander jumped into the stream, suffered a cramp and then a convulsion, and was pulled out nearly dead. He quickly developed pneumonia, but none of his physicians would treat him, because they feared that, if he died, they would be held responsible. One physician named Philip, who had treated Alexander since he was a child, agreed to treat him. Although he soon fell into a coma, he eventually recovered.

=== Battle of Issus ===
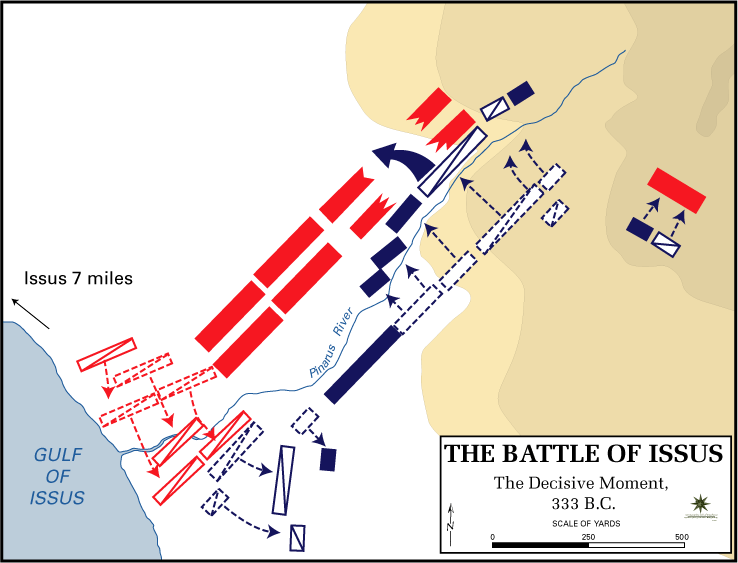
Alexander's decisive attack

The Battle of Issus took place in southern Anatolia on November 333 BC. After Alexander's forces defeated the Persians at the Battle of the Granicus, Darius took personal charge of his army, gathered a large army from the depths of the empire, and maneuvered to cut the Greek line of supply, requiring Alexander to countermarch his forces, setting the stage for the battle near the mouth of the Pinarus River and south of the village of Issus. Darius was apparently unaware that, by deciding to stage the battle on a river bank, he was minimizing the numerical advantage his army had over Alexander's.

Initially, Alexander chose what was apparently unfavorable ground. This surprised Darius who mistakenly elected to hold the wrong position while Alexander instructed his infantry to take up a defensive posture. Alexander personally led the more elite Greek Companion cavalry against the Persian left up against the hills, and cut up the enemy on the less encumbering terrain, thereby generating a quick rout. After achieving a breakthrough, Alexander demonstrated he could do the difficult thing and held the cavalry in check after it broke the Persian right. Alexander then mounted his beloved horse Bucephalus, took his place at the head of his Companion cavalry, and led a direct assault against Darius. The horses that were pulling Darius' chariot were injured, and began tossing at the yoke. Darius, about to fall off his chariot, instead jumped off. He threw his royal diadem away, mounted a horse, and fled the scene. The Persian troops, realizing they had lost, either surrendered or fled with their hapless king. The Macedonian cavalry pursued the fleeing Persians for as long as there was light. As with most ancient battles, significant carnage occurred after the battle as pursuing Macedonians slaughtered their crowded, disorganized foe.

The invading troops led by Alexander were outnumbered more than 2:1, yet they defeated the army personally led by Darius III of Achaemenid Persia. The battle was a decisive Macedonian victory and it marked the beginning of the end of Persian power. It was the first time the Persian army had been defeated with the King present on the field. Darius left his wife and an enormous amount of treasure behind as his army fled. The greed of the Macedonians helped to persuade them to keep going, as did the large number of Persian concubines and prostitutes they picked up in the battle. Darius, now fearing for both his throne and his life, sent a letter to Alexander in which he promised to pay a substantial ransom in exchange for the prisoners of war, and agreeing to a treaty of alliance with and the forfeiture of half of his empire to Alexander. Darius received a response which began "King Alexander to Darius". In the letter, Alexander blamed Darius for his father's death and claimed Darius was but a vulgar usurper, who planned to take Macedonia. He agreed to return the prisoners without ransom, but told Darius that he and Alexander were not equals, and that Darius was to henceforth address Alexander as "King of all Asia". Darius was also curtly informed that, if he wanted to dispute Alexander's claim to the Achaemenid throne, that he would have to stand and fight, and that if he instead fled, Alexander would pursue and kill him. By this, Alexander revealed for the first time that his plan was to conquer the entire Persian Empire.

=== Siege of Tyre ===
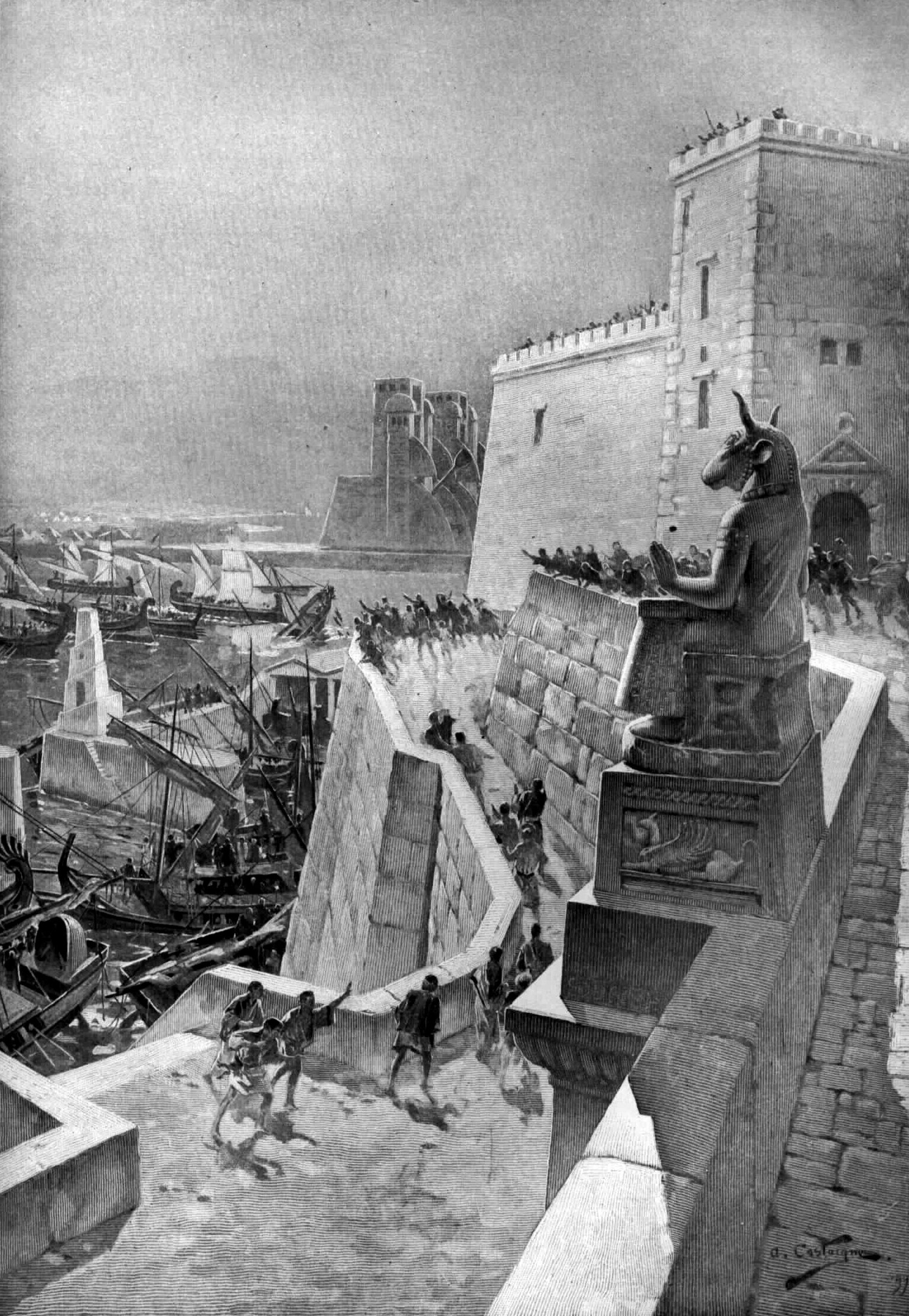
A naval action during the siege, Drawing by André Castaigne

The Siege of Tyre occurred in 332 BC when Alexander set out to conquer Tyre, a strategic coastal base. Tyre was the site of the only remaining Persian port that did not capitulate to Alexander. Even by this point in the war, the Persian navy still posed a major threat to Alexander. Tyre, the largest and most important city-state of Phoenicia, was located both on the Mediterranean coast as well as a nearby Island with two natural harbors on the landward side. At the time of the siege, the city held approximately 40,000 people, though the women and children were evacuated to Carthage, an ancient Phoenician colony.

Alexander sent an envoy to Tyre, proposing a peace treaty, and asked to visit their city and offer sacrifices to their God Melqart. The Tyrians politely told Alexander that their town was neutral in the war, and that allowing him to offer sacrifices to Melqart would be tantamount to recognizing him as their king. Alexander considered building a causeway that would allow his army to take the town by force. His engineers did not believe it would be possible to build such a massive structure, and so Alexander sent peace envoys once more to propose an alliance. The Tyrians believed this to be a sign of weakness, and so they killed the envoys and threw their bodies over the city wall. The dissent against Alexander's plans to take the city by force disappeared, and his engineers began to design the structure. Alexander began with an engineering feat that shows the true extent of his brilliance; as he could not attack the city from sea, he built a kilometer-long causeway stretching out to the island on a natural land bridge no more than two meters deep. Alexander then constructed two towers 150 feet high and moved them to the end of the causeway. The Tyrians, however, quickly devised a counterattack. They used an old horse transport ship, filling it with dried branches, pitch, brimstone, and any other flammable material. They then lit it on fire, and ran it up onto the causeway. The fire spread quickly, engulfing both towers and siege engines.

==== Alexander's navy ====
This convinced Alexander that he would be unable to take Tyre without a navy. Presently, the Persian navy returned to find their home cities under Alexander's control. Since their allegiance was to their city, they were therefore Alexander's. He now had eighty ships. This coincided with the arrival of another hundred and twenty from Cyprus, which had heard of his victories and wished to join him, as well as twenty three from Ionia. Alexander then sailed on Tyre and quickly blockaded both ports with his superior numbers. He had several of the slower galleys, and a few barges, refit with battering rams, one of the only known cases of battering rams being used on ships. Alexander started testing the wall at various points with his rams, until he made a small breach in the south end of the island. He then coordinated an attack across the breach with a bombardment from all sides by his navy. Once his troops forced their way into the city, they easily overtook the garrison, and quickly captured the city. Those citizens that took shelter in the temple of Heracles were pardoned by Alexander. It is said that Alexander was so enraged at the Tyrians' defense and the loss of his men that he destroyed half the city. Alexander granted pardon to the king and his family, whilst 30,000 residents and foreigners taken were sold into slavery.

==== Egypt ====
===== Siege of Gaza =====
The stronghold at Gaza was built on a hill and was heavily fortified. The inhabitants of Gaza and their Nabataean allies did not want to lose the lucrative trade which was controlled by Gaza.

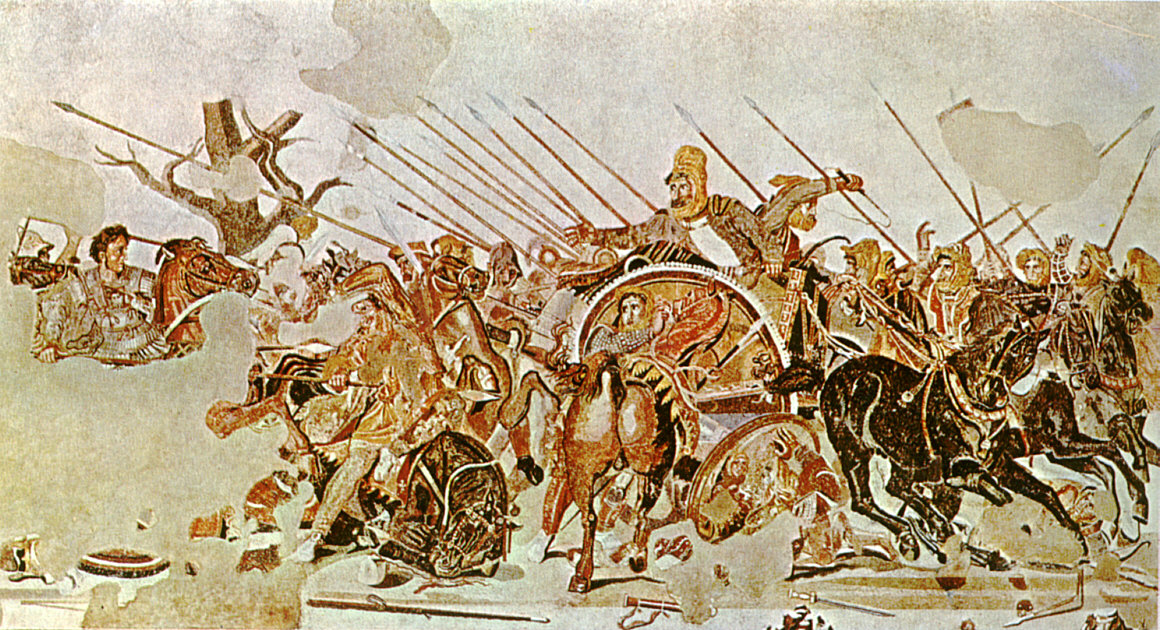
Alexander Mosaic, showing Battle of Issus, from the House of the Faun, Pompeii

Batis, the commander of the fortress of Gaza, refused to surrender to Alexander. Though a eunuch, Batis was physically imposing and ruthless. After three unsuccessful assaults, the stronghold was finally taken by force, but not before Alexander received a serious shoulder wound. When Gaza was taken, the male population was put to the sword and the women and children were sold into slavery. According to the Roman historian Quintus Curtius Rufus, Batis was killed by Alexander in imitation of Achilles' treatment of the fallen Hector. A rope was forced through Batis's ankles, probably between the ankle bone and the Achilles tendon, and Batis was dragged alive by chariot beneath the walls of the city. Alexander, who admired courage in his enemies and might have been inclined to show mercy to the brave Persian general, was infuriated at Batis's refusal to kneel and by the enemy commander's haughty silence and contemptuous manner.

With Gaza taken, Alexander marched into Egypt. His entry was described as "closer to a triumphant procession than an invasion." They welcomed Alexander as their king, placed him on the throne of the Pharaohs, giving him the crown of Upper and Lower Egypt, and named him the incarnation of Ra and Osiris. He set in motion plans to build Alexandria, filled most important offices with Macedonians, and established Cleomenes of Naucratis as his overseer (possibly under the title of satrap) channeling Egypt's tax revenues to him.

=== Battle of Gaugamela ===
The Battle of Gaugamela took place in 331 BC in what is now Iraqi Kurdistan, possibly near Dohuk, and resulted in a decisive victory for the Macedonians. After the Siege of Gaza, Alexander advanced from Syria towards the heart of the Persian Empire, crossing both the Euphrates and the Tigris rivers without any opposition. Darius was building up a massive army, drawing men from the far reaches of his empire, and planned to use sheer numbers to crush Alexander. Though Alexander had conquered part of the Persian empire, it was still vast in area and in manpower reserves, and Darius could recruit far more men. Also present in the Persian army, a sign that the Persians were still very powerful, were the feared war elephants. While Darius had a significant advantage in number of soldiers, most of his troops were not as organized as Alexander's.

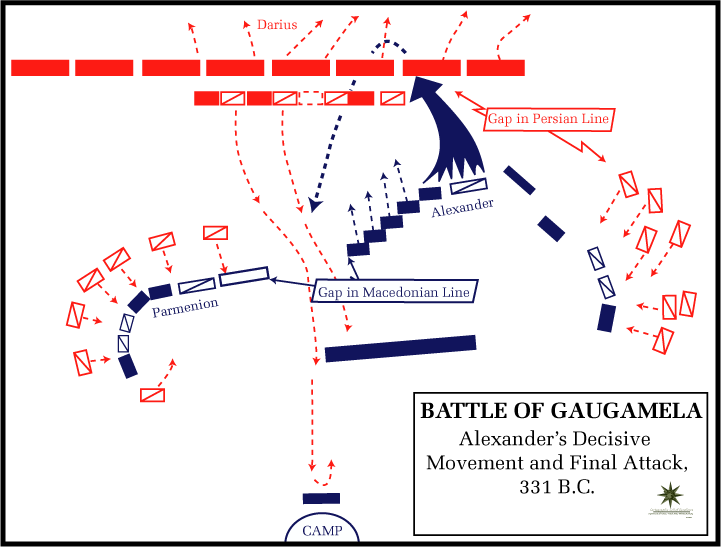
Alexander's decisive attack

The battle began with the Persians already present at the battlefield. Darius had recruited the finest cavalry from his eastern satrapies. Darius placed himself in the center with his best infantry as was the tradition among Persian kings. The Macedonians were divided into two, with the right side of the army falling under the direct command of Alexander, and the left to Parmenion. Alexander began by ordering his infantry to march in phalanx formation towards the center of the enemy line. Darius now launched his chariots, which were intercepted by the Agrianians, and quickly rendered useless. Alexander, while leading the charge, formed his units into a giant wedge, which quickly smashed right into the weakened Persian center. Darius' charioteer was killed by a spear, and chaos rang out as many incorrectly assumed it was Darius who was killed. The Persian line then collapsed, and Darius fled. Darius escaped with a small core of his forces remaining intact, although the Bactrian cavalry and Bessus soon caught up with him. The remaining Persian resistance was quickly put down. In all, the Battle of Gaugamela was a disastrous defeat for the Persians, and possibly one of Alexander's finest victories.

==== Persis ====
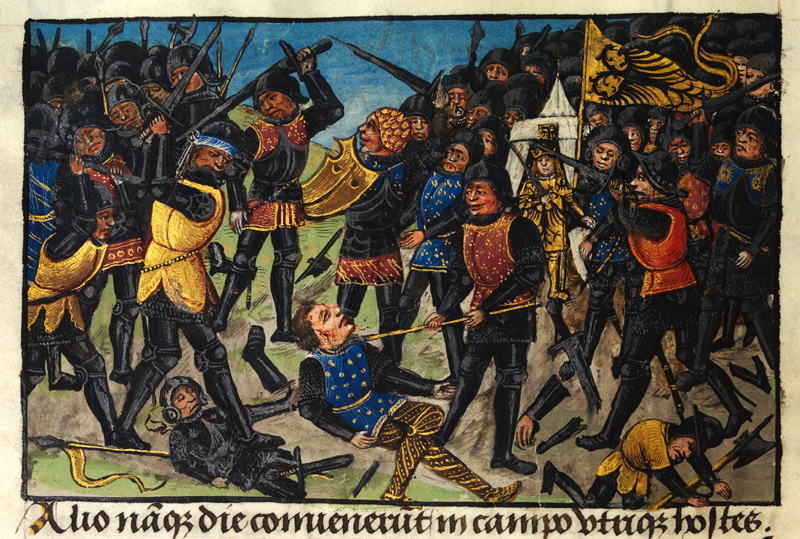
Alexander's first victory over the Persian king Darius, depicted in medieval European style in the 15th century romance The History of Alexander's Battles

After the battle, Parmenion rounded up the Persian baggage train while Alexander and his own bodyguard chased after Darius in hopes of catching up. Substantial amounts of loot were gained following the battle, with 4,000 talents captured, as well as the King's personal chariot and bow. Darius planned to head further east, and raise another army to face Alexander while he and the Macedonians headed to one of the Persian capitals, Babylon, and then to another, Susa. There, Alexander found wealth that even he had never imagined possible, 50,000 talents, he sacrificed at the altars and held a torch race, then sent 3,000 silver talents to Menes, to give to Antipater in order to fight the Spartans. Darius, meanwhile, dispatched letters to his eastern satrapies asking them to remain loyal. The satrapies, however, had other intentions, and quickly capitulated to Alexander.

Bessus fatally stabbed Darius, before fleeing eastwards. Darius was found by one of Alexander's scouts, moaning in pain. Darius, dying and chained to a baggage train being pulled by an ox, was lying next to a lone dog and his royal robes were covered in blood. He asked for water, and then, clutching the Macedonian soldier's hand, said that he was thankful that he would not die utterly alone and abandoned. Alexander, who may have felt genuinely saddened at Darius' death, buried Darius next to his Achaemenid predecessors in a full military funeral. Alexander claimed that, while dying, Darius had named Alexander as his successor to the Achaemenid throne and had asked Alexander to avenge his death, a striking irony since it was Alexander who had pursued him to his death. The Achaemenid Persian Empire is considered to have fallen with the death of Darius.

Alexander, viewing himself as the legitimate Achaemenid successor to Darius, viewed Bessus as a usurper to the Achaemenid throne, and eventually found and executed this 'usurper'. The majority of the existing satraps were to give their loyalty to Alexander, and be allowed to keep their positions. Alexander's troops now thought the war was over. Alexander was unsure how to deal with this, so he decided to scare them into submission. He gave a speech, arguing that their conquests were not secure, that the Persians did not want the Greeks to remain in their country, and that only the strength of Macedon could secure the country. The speech worked, and Alexander's troops agreed to remain with him. Alexander, now the Persian "King of Kings", adopted Persian dress and mannerisms, which, in time, the Greeks began to view as decadent and autocratic. They began to fear that Alexander, the king they had hero-worshiped, was turning into an eastern despot, although a young eunuch was eventually introduced to Alexander, and helped to keep his decadence in check.

==== Battle of the Persian Gate ====
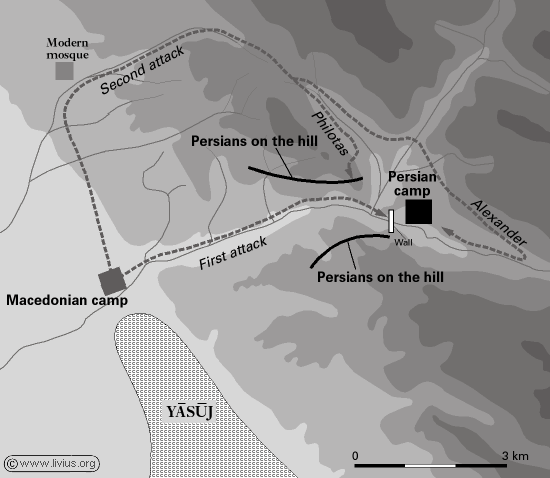
Map of the Persian Gate

In the winter of 330 BC, at the Battle of the Persian Gate northeast of today's Yasuj in Iran, the Persian satrap Ariobarzanes led a last stand of the Persian forces. After the Battle of Gaugamela in present-day Iraqi Kurdistan, Alexander had advanced to Babylon and Susa. A Royal Road connected Susa with the more eastern capitals of Persepolis and Pasargadae in Persis (the Persian Empire had several "capitals"), and was the natural venue for Alexander's continued campaign. After the conquest of Susa, Alexander split the Macedonian army into two parts. Alexander's general, Parmenion, took one half along the Royal Road, and Alexander himself took the route towards Persis. Passing into Persis required traversing the Persian Gates, a narrow mountain pass that lent itself easily to ambush.

Believing that, after his victory over the Uxians, he would not encounter any more enemy forces during his march, Alexander neglected to send scouts ahead of his vanguard, and thus walked into Ariobarzanes' ambush. Once the Macedonian army had advanced sufficiently into the narrow pass, the Persians rained down boulders on them from the northern slopes. From the southern slope, Persian archers and catapults launched their projectiles. Alexander's army initially suffered heavy casualties, losing entire platoons at a time. Ariobarzanes had hoped that defeating Alexander at the Persian Gates would allow the Persians more time to field another army, and possibly stop the Macedonian invasion altogether.

Ariobarzanes held the pass for a month, but Alexander succeeded in encircling the Persian army and broke through the Persian defenses. The defeat of Ariobarzanes's forces at the Persian Gate removed the last military obstacle between Alexander and Persepolis. Upon his arrival at the city of Persepolis, Alexander appointed a general named Phrasaortes as successor of Ariobarzanes. Four months later, Alexander allowed the troops to loot Persepolis. A fire broke out and spread to the rest of the city. It is not clear if it had been a drunken accident, or a deliberate act of revenge for the burning of the Acropolis of Athens during the Second Greco-Persian War.

=== Siege of the Sogdian Rock ===
==== Bactria ====
In 329 BC, Alexander launched the Siege of Cyropolis and fought against the Sakas in Battle of Jaxartes. After Alexander defeated the last of the Achaemenid Empire's forces in battle of Gabai against Spitamenes, and Coenus (Koinos), one Alexander the Great's generals in 328 BC, he began a new campaign to Ariana in 327 BC. He wanted to conquer the entire known world, which in Alexander's day, ended on the eastern end of India. Greeks of Alexander's day knew nothing of China, or any other lands east of Bactria. The Siege of the Sogdian Rock, a fortress located north of Bactria in Sogdiana, occurred in 327 BC. Oxyartes of Bactria had sent his wife and daughters, one of whom was Roxana, to take refuge in the fortress, as it was thought to be impregnable, and was provisioned for a long siege. When Alexander asked the defenders to surrender, they refused, telling him that he would need "men with wings" to capture it. Alexander asked for volunteers, whom he would reward if they could climb the cliffs under the fortress. There were some 300 men who from previous sieges had gained experience in rock-climbing. Using tent-pegs and strong flaxen lines, they climbed the cliff face at night, losing about 30 of their number during the ascent. In accordance with Alexander's orders, they signaled their success to the troops below by waving bits of linen, and Alexander sent a herald to shout the news to the enemy's advanced posts that they might now surrender without further delay. The defenders were so surprised and demoralized by this that they surrendered. Alexander fell in love with Roxana, whom ancient historians call the "most beautiful woman in the world" (not an uncommon claim for an ancient queen), on sight and eventually married her. The story of the siege is told by the Roman historian Arrian of Nicomedia, in Anabasis(section 4.18.4-19.6)

=== Indian campaign ===
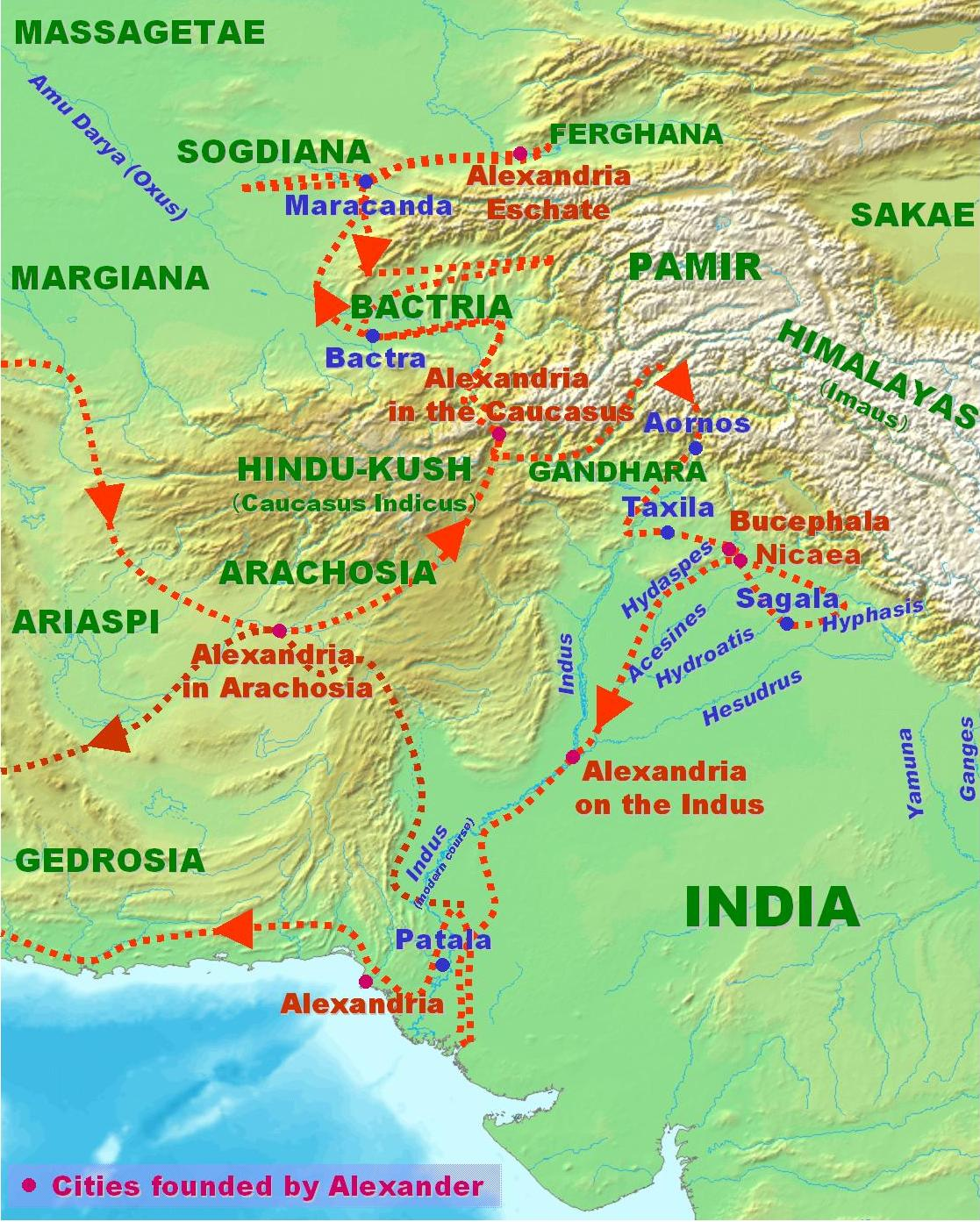
Campaigns and landmarks of Alexander's invasion of the Indian subcontinent

After the death of Spitamenes and his marriage to Roxana (Roshanak in Bactrian) to cement his relations with his new Central Asian satrapies, Alexander was finally free to turn his attention to the Indian subcontinent. Alexander invited all the chieftains of the former satrapy of Gandhara, in the north of what is now the Jhelum River, Pakistan, to come to him and submit to his authority. Omphis, ruler of Taxila, whose kingdom extended from the Indus to the Hydaspes, complied, but the chieftains of some hill clans, including the Aspasioi and Assakenoi sections of the Kambojas (known in Indian texts also as Ashvayanas and Ashvakayanas), refused to submit.

In the winter of 327/326 BC, Alexander personally led a campaign against these clans; the Aspasioi of Kunar valley, the Guraeans of the Guraeus valley, and the Assakenoi of the Swat and Buner valleys. A fierce contest ensued with the Aspasioi in which Alexander himself was wounded in the shoulder by a dart but eventually the Aspasioi lost the fight. Alexander then faced the Assakenoi, who fought bravely and offered stubborn resistance to Alexander in the strongholds of Massaga, Ora and Aornos. The fort of Massaga could only be reduced after several days of bloody fighting in which Alexander himself was wounded seriously in the ankle. According to Curtius, "Not only did Alexander slaughter the entire population of Massaga, but also did he reduce its buildings to rubbles". A similar slaughter then followed at Ora, another stronghold of the Assakenoi. In the aftermath of Massaga and Ora, numerous Assakenians fled to the fortress of Aornos. Alexander followed close behind their heels and captured the strategic hill-fort after the fourth day of a bloody fight.

=== Battle of Hydaspes ===
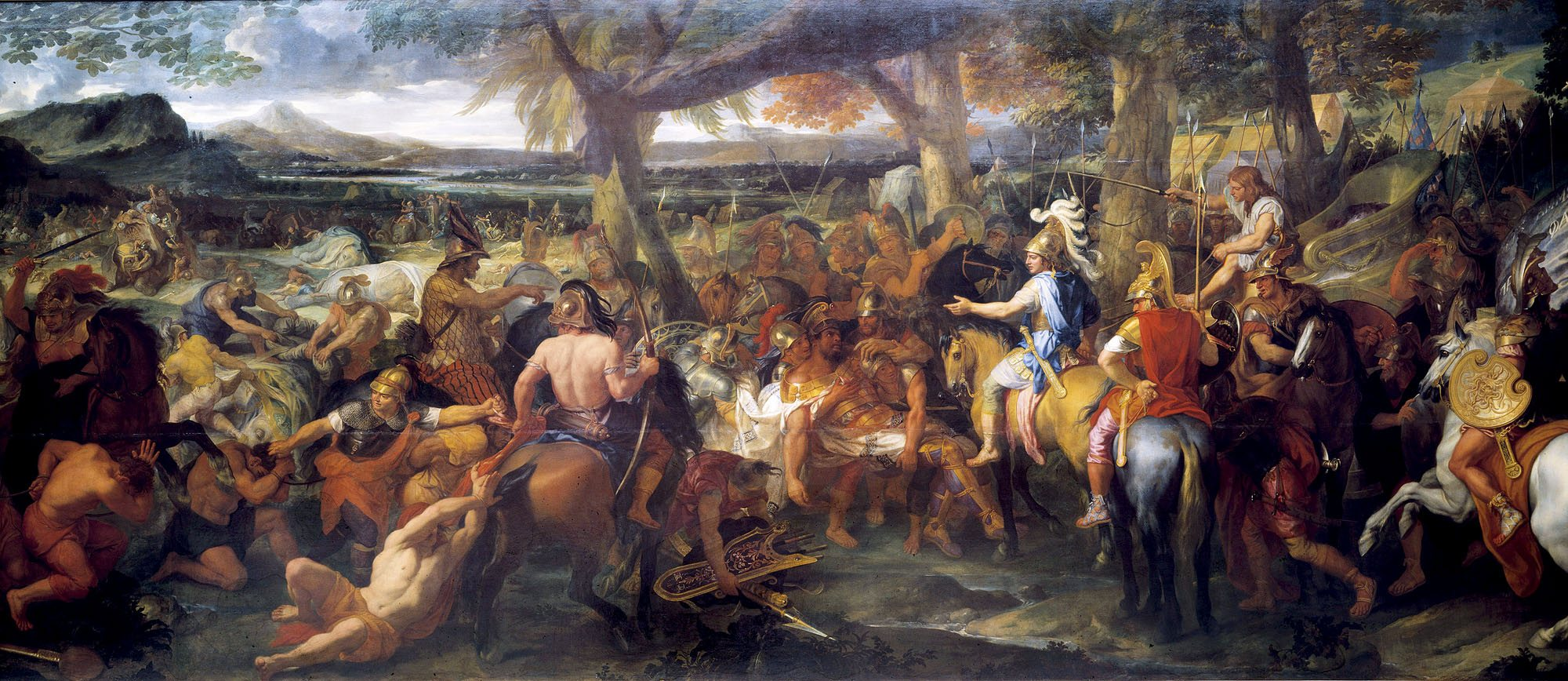
A painting by Charles Le Brun depicting Alexander and Porus (Puru) during the Battle of the Hydaspes.

After gaining control of the former Achaemenid satrapy of Gandhara, including the city of Taxila, Alexander advanced into Punjab, where he engaged in battle against the regional king Porus, whom Alexander defeated in the Battle of the Hydaspes in 326 BC, but was so impressed by the demeanor with which the king carried himself that he allowed Porus to continue governing his own kingdom as a satrap. Although victorious, Battle of the Hydaspes was also the most costly battle fought by the Macedonians.

East of Porus' kingdom, near the Ganges River, was the powerful Nanda Empire of Magadha. According to the Greek sources, the Nanda army was five times larger than the Macedonian army. Fearing the prospects of facing the powerful Nanda Empire armies and exhausted by years of campaigning, his army mutinied at the Hyphasis River, refusing to march further east. This river thus marks the easternmost extent of Alexander's conquests.

As for the Macedonians, however, their struggle with Porus blunted their courage and stayed their further advance into India. For having done all they could do to repulse an enemy who mustered only twenty thousand infantry and two thousand horse, they violently opposed Alexander when he insisted on crossing the river Ganges also, the width of which, as they learned, was thirty-two furlongs, its depth a hundred fathoms, while its banks on the further side were covered with multitudes of men-at-arms and horsemen and elephants. For they were told that the kings of the Ganderites and Praesii were awaiting them with eighty thousand horsemen, two hundred thousand footmen, eight thousand chariots, and six thousand fighting elephants.

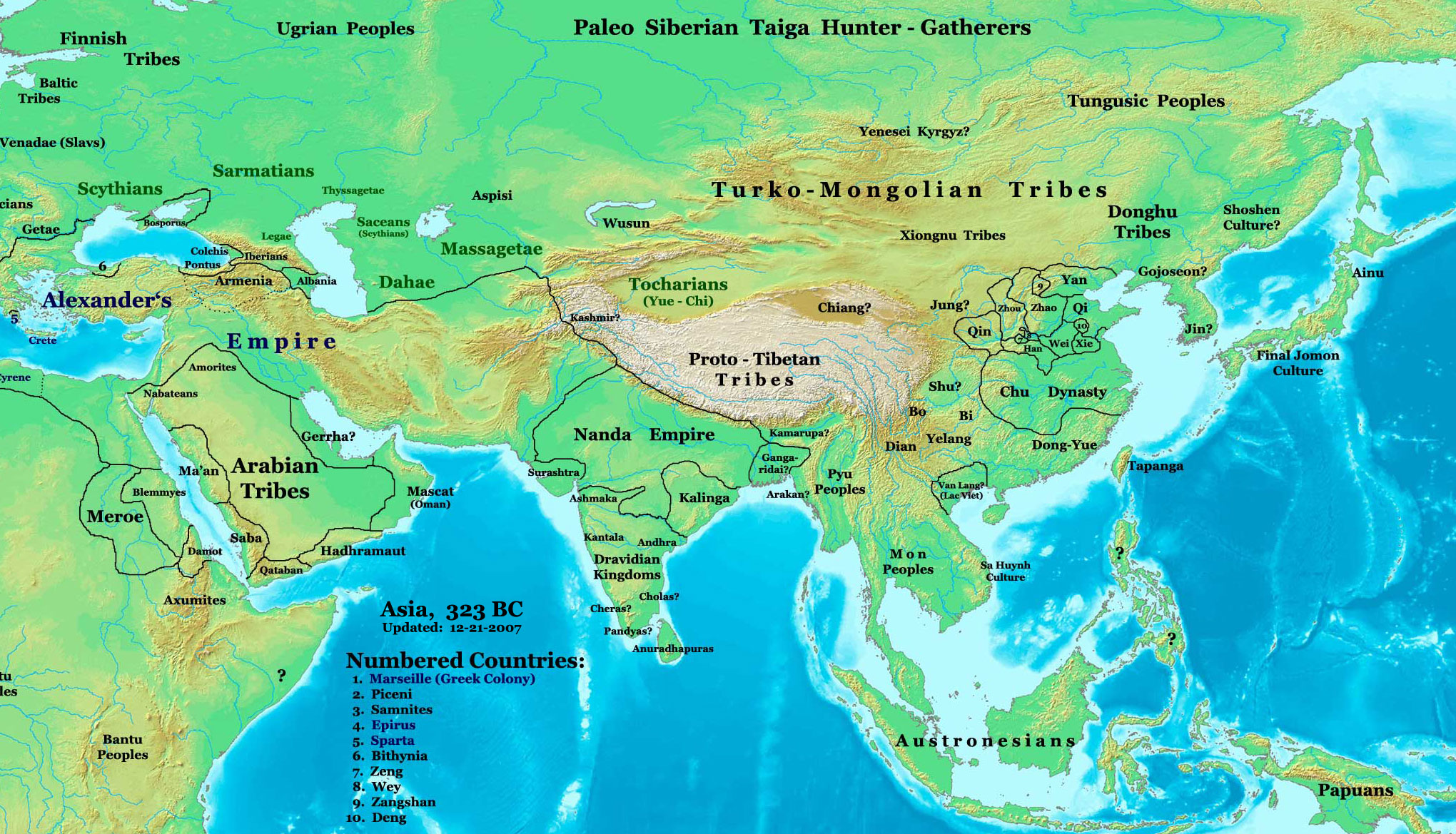
Asia in 323 BC, the Nanda Empire and Gangaridai Empire of ancient India in relation to Alexander's empire and neighbors

Alexander spoke to his army and tried to persuade them to march further into India but Coenus pleaded with him to change his opinion and return, the men, he said, "longed to again see their parents, their wives and children, their homeland". Alexander, seeing the unwillingness of his men agreed and diverted. Along the way his army conquered the Malli clans (in modern-day Multan). In the territory of the Indus, he nominated his officer Peithon as a satrap, a position he would hold for the next ten years until 316 BC, and in the Punjab he left Eudemus in charge of the army, at the side of the satrap Porus and Taxiles. Eudemus became ruler of a part of the Punjab after their death. Both rulers returned to the West in 316 BC with their armies. In 321 BC, Chandragupta Maurya founded the Maurya Empire in India and overthrew the Greek satraps.

=== Return from India ===
Alexander now sent much of his army to Carmania (modern southern Iran) with his general Craterus, and commissioned a fleet to explore the Persian Gulf shore under his admiral Nearchus, while he led the rest of his forces back to Persia by the southern route through the Gedrosian Desert (now part of southern Iran and Makran now part of Pakistan). According to Plutarch, during the 60-day march through the desert, Alexander lost three-quarters of his army to the harsh desert conditions along the way.

== Battle record ==
Outcome	Date	War	Action	Opponent/s	Type	Country (present day)	Rank
Victory	2 August 338 BC	Philip II's submission of Greece	Battle of Chaeronea	Thebans, Athenians and other Greek cities	Battle	Greece	Prince
Victory	335 BC	Balkan Campaign	Battle of Mount Haemus	Getae, Thracians	Battle	Bulgaria	King
Victory	335 BC	Balkan Campaign	Siege of Pelium	Illyrians	Siege	Albania	King
Victory	335 BC	Balkan Campaign	Battle of Thebes	Thebans	Battle	Greece	King
Victory	May 334 BC	Persian Campaign	Battle of the Granicus	Achaemenid Empire	Battle	Turkey	King
Victory	334 BC	Persian Campaign	Siege of Miletus	Achaemenid Empire, Milesians	Siege	Turkey	King
Victory	334 BC	Persian Campaign	Siege of Halicarnassus	Achaemenid Empire	Siege	Turkey	King
Victory	5 November 333 BC	Persian Campaign	Battle of Issus	Achaemenid Empire	Battle	Turkey	King
Victory	January–July 332 BC	Persian Campaign	Siege of Tyre	Achaemenid Empire, Tyrians	Siege	Lebanon	King
Victory	October 332 BC	Persian Campaign	Siege of Gaza	Achaemenid Empire	Siege	Palestine	King
Victory	1 October 331 BC	Persian Campaign	Battle of Gaugamela	Achaemenid Empire	Battle	Iraq	King
Victory	December 331 BC	Persian Campaign	Battle of the Uxian Defile	Uxians	Battle	Iran	King
Victory	330 BC	Persian Campaign	Battle of the Persian Gate	Achaemenid Empire	Battle	Iran	King
Victory	329 BC	Central Asiatic Campaign	Siege of Cyropolis	Sogdians	Siege	Turkmenistan	King
Victory	October 329 BC	Central Asiatic Campaign	Battle of Jaxartes	Scythians	Battle	Uzbekistan	King
Victory	327 BC	Central Asiatic Campaign	Siege of the Sogdian Rock	Sogdians	Siege	Uzbekistan	King
Victory	May 327 – March 326 BC	Indian Campaign	Cophen campaign	Aspasians	Expedition	Afghanistan and Pakistan	King
Victory	April 326 BC	Indian Campaign	Siege of Aornos	Aśvaka	Siege	Pakistan	King
Victory	May 326 BC	Indian Campaign	Battle of the Hydaspes	Porus	Battle	Pakistan	King
Victory	November 326 – February 325 BC	Indian Campaign	Siege of Multan	Malli	Siege	Pakistan	King

== See also ==
- Ancient Macedonian army
- Military tactics of Alexander the Great
- Diadochi

== Bibliography ==
- Arrian (1976) [140s AD]. The Campaigns of Alexander. trans. Aubrey de Sélincourt. Penguin Books. ISBN 978-0-14-044253-3.
- Bowra, C. Maurice (1994) [1957]. The Greek Experience. London: Phoenix Orion Books Ltd. p. 9. ISBN 978-1-85799-122-2.
- Farrokh, Kaveh (24 April 2007). Shadows in the Desert: Ancient Persia at War (General Military). Osprey Publishing. p. 106. ISBN 978-1-84603-108-3. ISBN 978-1-84603-108-3.
- Lane Fox, Robin (1973). Alexander the Great. Allen Lane. ISBN 978-0-86007-707-7.
- Lane Fox, Robin (1980). The Search for Alexander. Little Brown & Co. Boston. ISBN 978-0-316-29108-8.
- Green, Peter (1992). Alexander of Macedon: 356–323 B.C. A Historical Biography. University of California Press. ISBN 978-0-520-07166-7.
- Plutarch (2004). Life of Alexander. Modern Library. ISBN 978-0-8129-7133-0.
- Renault, Mary (1979). The Nature of Alexander. Pantheon Books. ISBN 978-0-394-73825-3.
- Robinson, Cyril Edward (1929). A History of Greece. Methuen & Company Limited. ISBN 978-1-84603-108-3.
- Strudwick, Helen (2013). The Encyclopedia of Ancient Egypt. London: Amber Books. ISBN 978-1-4351-4654-9.
- Wilcken, Ulrich (1997) [1932]. Alexander the Great. W. W. Norton & Company. ISBN 978-0-393-00381-9.
- Worthington, Ian (2003). Alexander the Great. Routledge. ISBN 978-0-415-29187-3.
- Worthington, Ian (2004). Alexander the Great: Man and God. Pearson. ISBN 978-1-4058-0162-1.
