= Sacesinian people =

Sacesinians were an ancient people who fought for the Persians in Alexander the Great's war of conquest on the Achaemenid Empire. They gave horsemen to the Persians which were used together with the horsemen of Ardan Caucasian Albania. They lived in the northeast of Armenia along the Kura river.
