= Last stand =

Situation in which a military unit holds against overwhelming odds

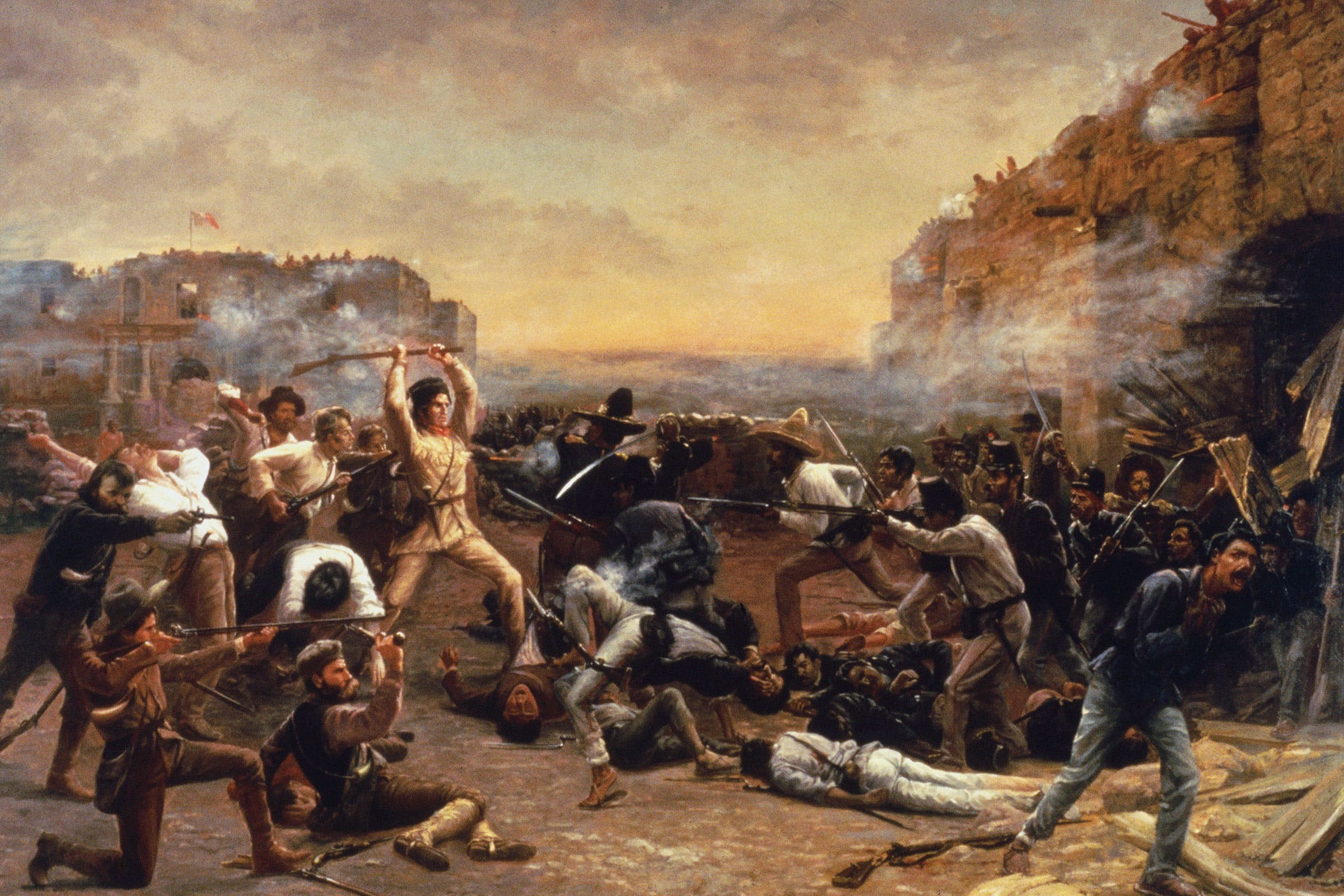
The Fall of the Alamo (1903) by Robert Jenkins Onderdonk, depicts Davy Crockett wielding his rifle as a club against Mexican troops in the Battle of the Alamo in Texas in 1836.

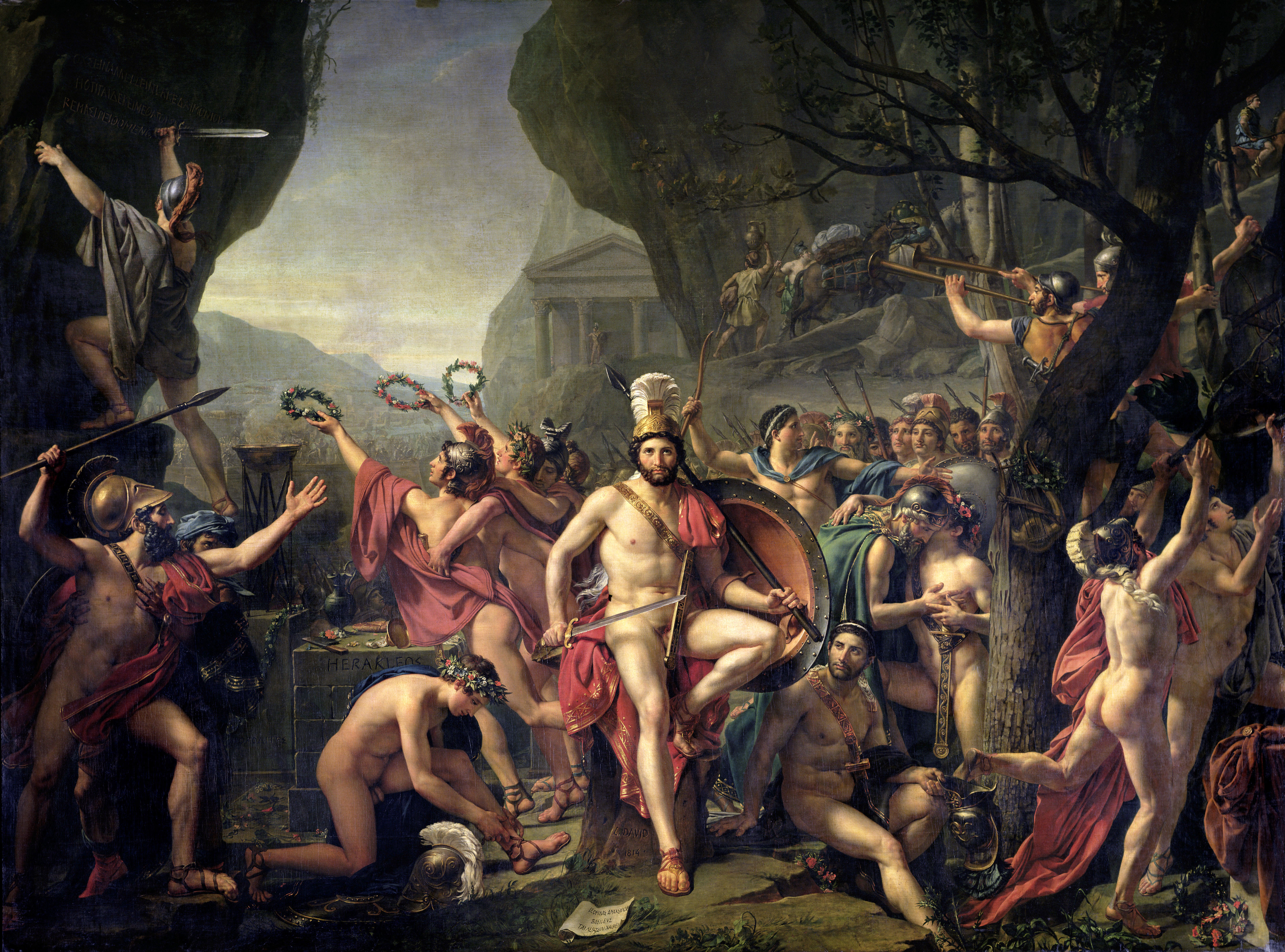
Leonidas at Thermopylae, by Jacques-Louis David, 1814. This painting is a juxtaposition of various historical and legendary elements from the Battle of Thermopylae in Greece in 480 BC.

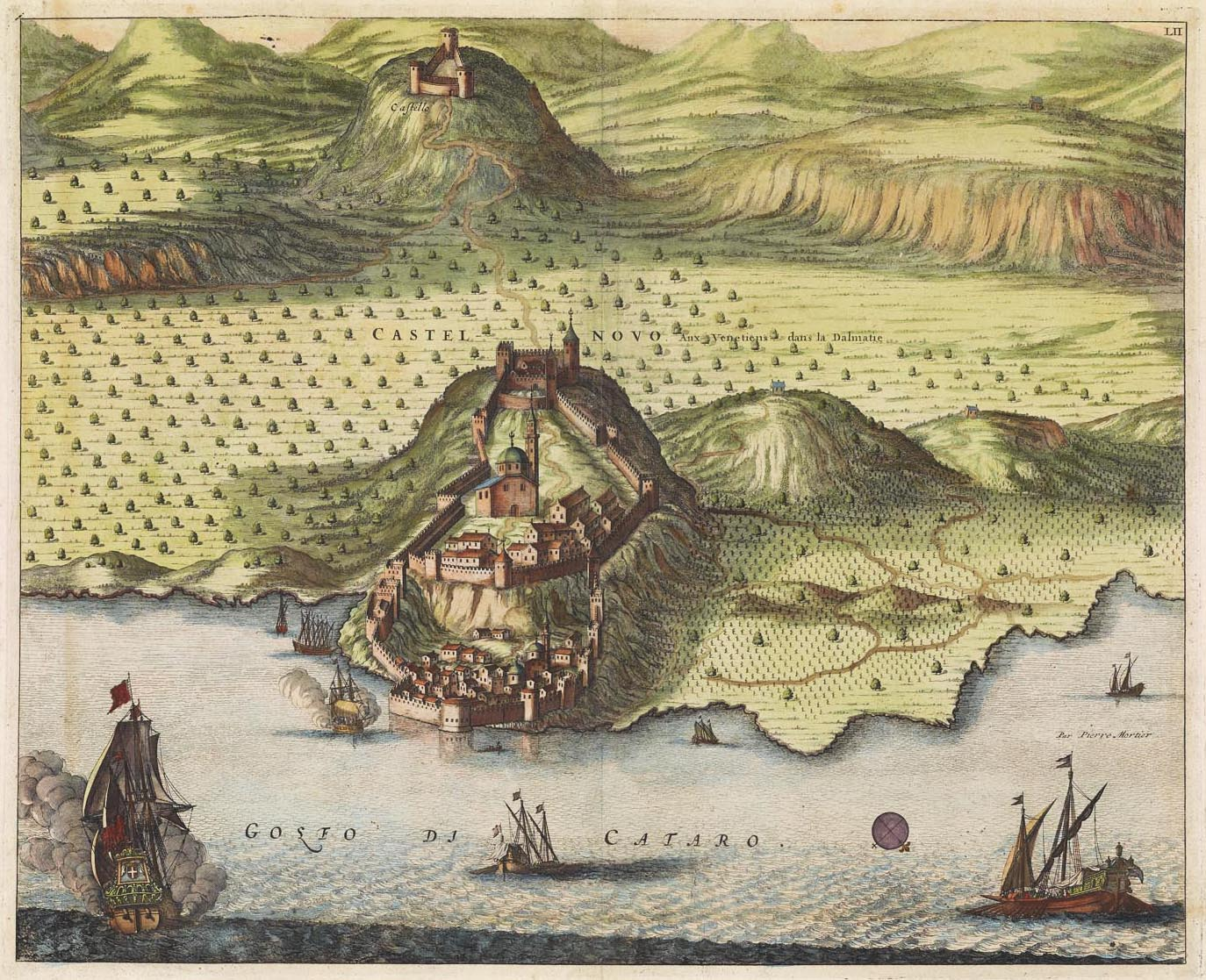
Siege of Castelnuovo in July, 1539. Defense of a 4,000-man garrison in the service of Charles I of Spain, against a 50,000-strong Ottoman assault force, resulting in a last stand. Painting by Pierre Mortier.

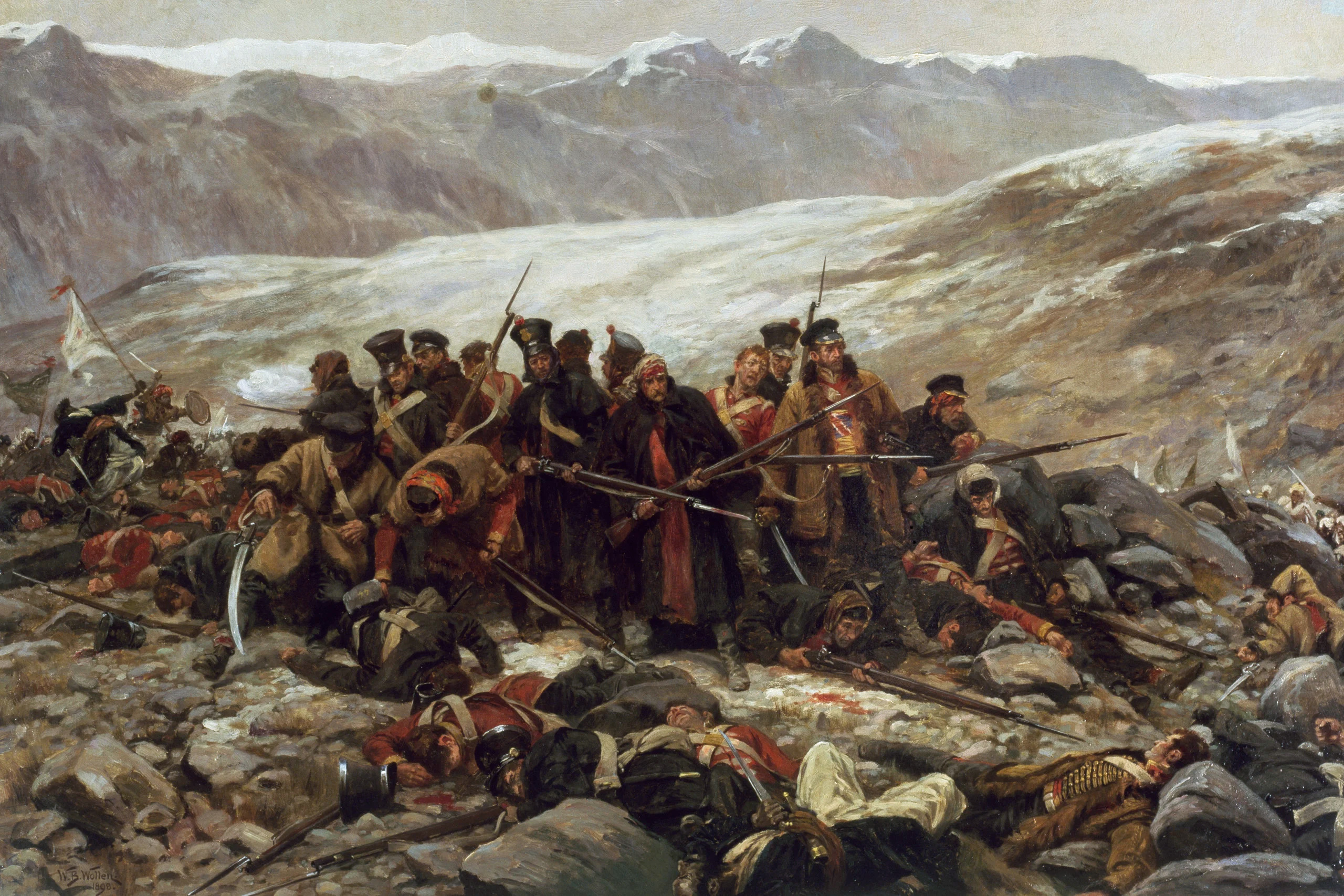
The last stand of the survivors of Her Majesty's 44th Regiment of Foot at Gandamak in Afghanistan in 1842. The Last Stand of the 44th Regiment at Gundamuck painted by William Barnes Wollen, 1898

A last stand, or a final stand, is a military situation in which a body of troops holds a defensive position in the face of overwhelming and virtually insurmountable odds. Troops may make a last stand due to a sense of duty; because they are defending a tactically crucial point; to buy time to enable a trapped army, person, or group of people to escape; due to fear of execution if captured; or to protect their leader(s). Last stands loom large in history, as the heroism and sacrifice of the defenders exert a large pull on the public's imagination. Some last stands have become a celebrated part of a fighting force's or a country's history, especially if the defenders accomplished their goals (or, in rare cases, defeated their attackers).

== Tactical significance ==
A "last stand" is a last resort tactic, and is chosen because the defending force realizes or believes that the benefits of fighting outweigh the benefits of retreat or surrender. This usually arises from strategic or moral considerations, such as staying and fighting to buy time for wounded soldiers or civilians to get to a safe place, leading defenders to conclude that their sacrifice is essential to the greater success of their campaign or cause, as happened at the end of the Battle of Saragarhi. The situation can arise in several ways. One situation is that retreat by the defending force would lead to immediate defeat, usually due to the surrounding geography or shortage of supplies or support, as happened to the Royalist infantry on Wadborough Hill after the Battle of Naseby.

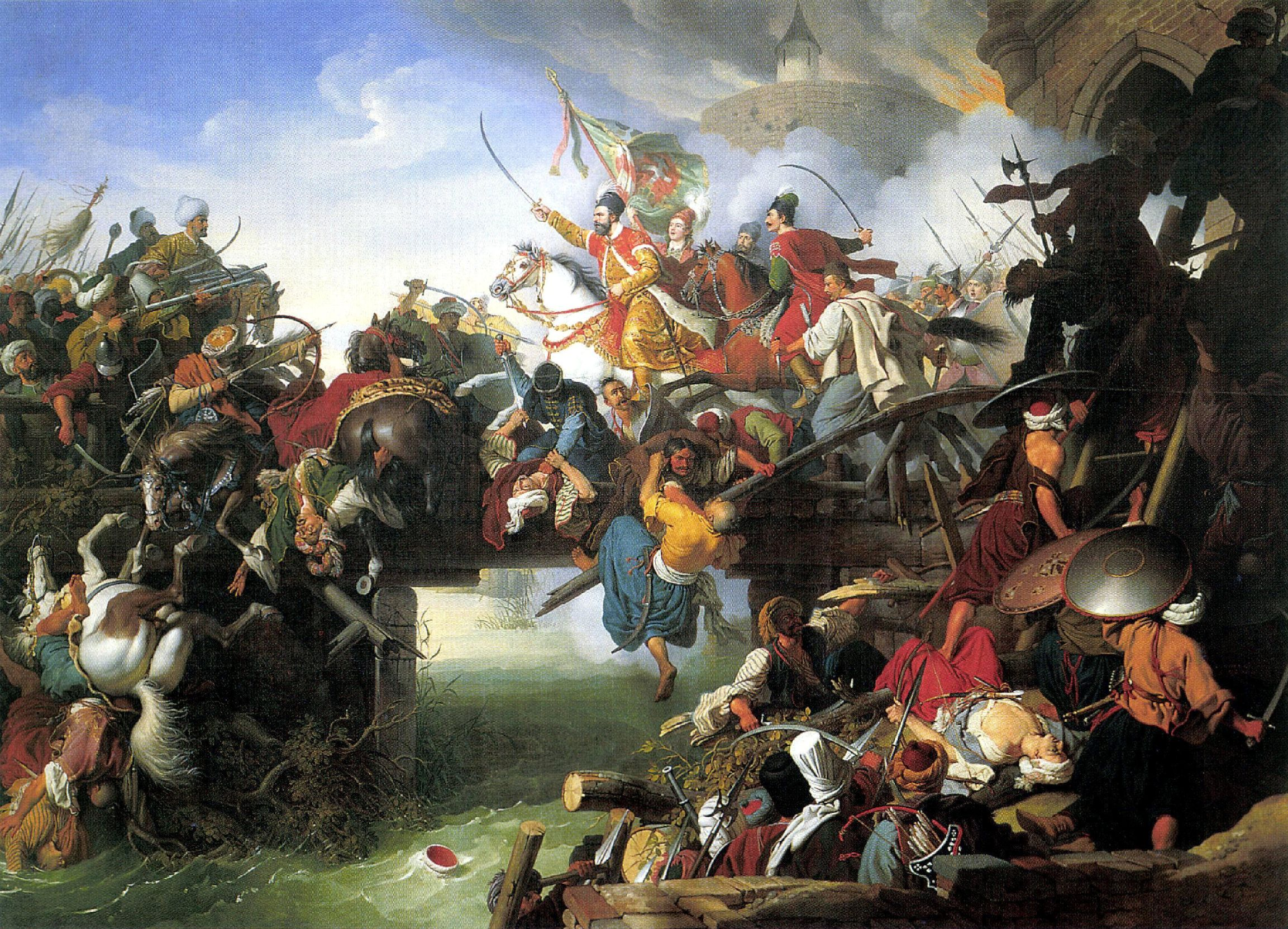
Siege of Szigetvár (1566) -- Nikola Šubić Zrinski's charge from the fortress of Szigetvár (painting by Johann Peter Krafft, 1825)

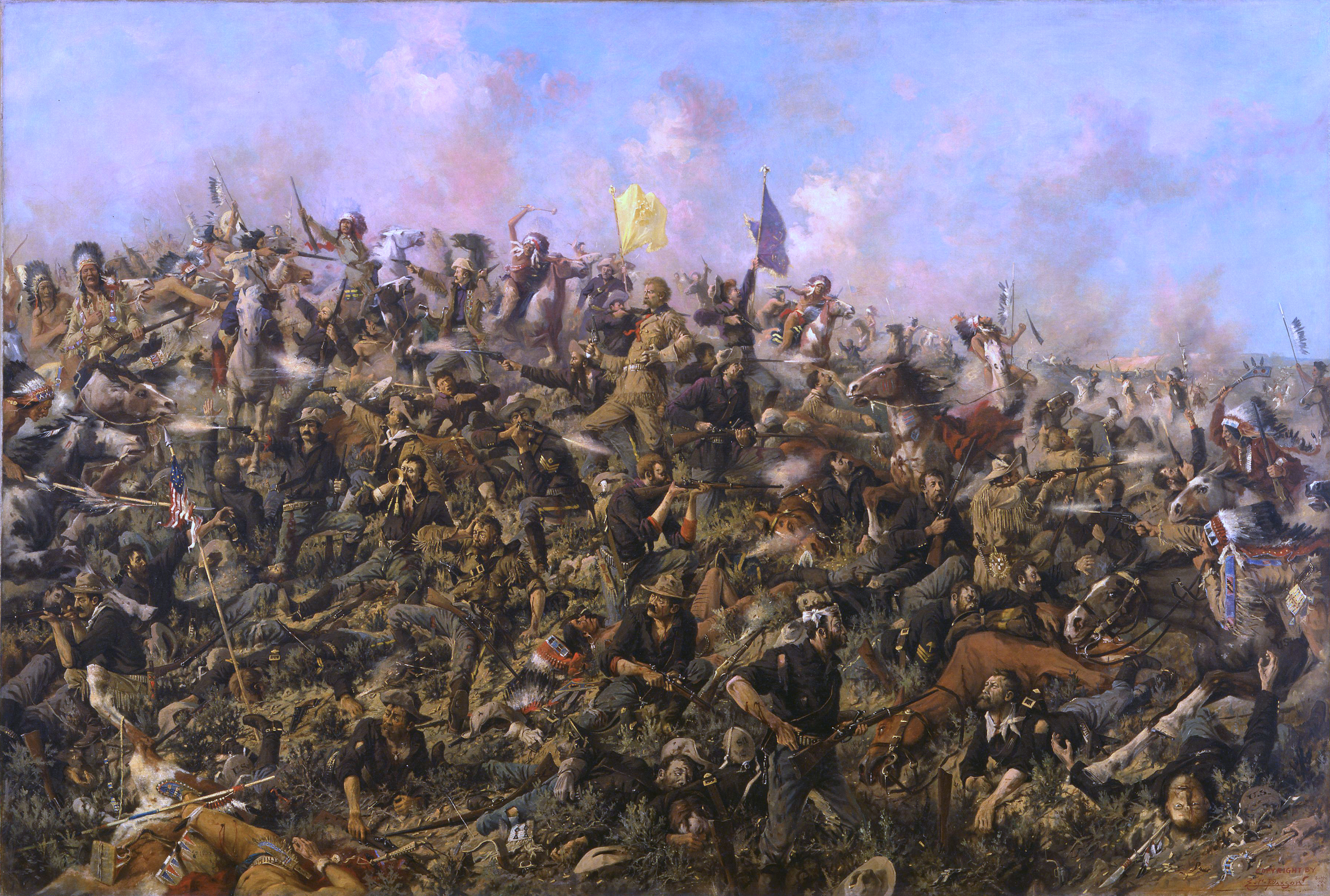
Custer's last stand in the Montana Territory, United States in 1876 as depicted in a painting by Edgar Samuel Paxson.

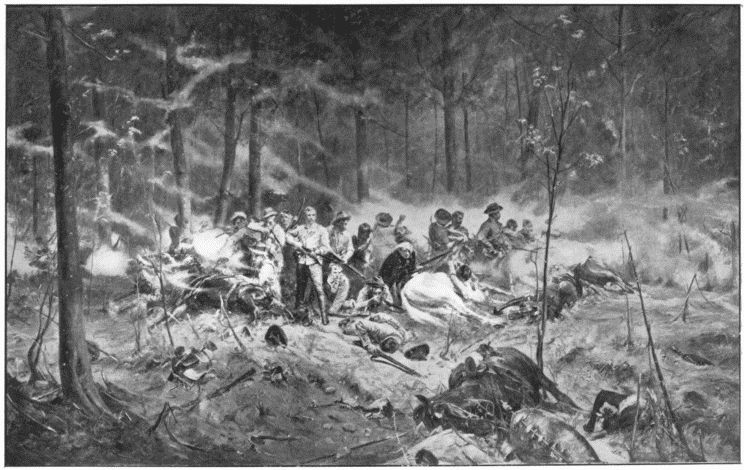
The Shangani Patrol -- The last stand of Major Allan Wilson, Matabeleland, 4 December 1893.

Some military thinkers have cautioned against putting an opposing force into a last stand situation, recognizing that trapped men will fight harder. Sun Tzu wrote: "To a surrounded enemy, you must leave a way of escape". Similarly, they have sometimes suggested deliberately putting their own forces in such a situation, for example by burning boats or bridges that could tempt them to retreat.

The historian Bryan Perrett suggests that although the majority of last stands throughout history have seen the defending force overwhelmed, on rare occasions the outnumbered defenders succeed in their desperate endeavors and live to fight another day, and he lists the Battle of Agincourt and the Battle of Rorke's Drift as such engagements.

=== Fear of execution ===
Troops may fight a last stand if they believe that they will be executed if they surrender.

In Custer's last stand, at the end of the battle, the extent of the soldiers' resistance to the Lakota and Cheyenne warriors indicated they had few doubts about their prospects for survival if they surrendered. In the end, the hilltop where George Armstrong Custer's remaining troops made their last stand made it impossible for Custer's men to secure a defensive position. Nevertheless, the soldiers put up their most dogged defence, and died fighting.

During the Warsaw Ghetto Uprising, by the end of 1942, the Jews trapped in the Warsaw Ghetto learned that the deportations were part of an extermination process, as the deportees were sent to death camps. Many of the remaining Jews decided to revolt. The first armed resistance in the ghetto occurred in January 1943. On 19 April 1943, Passover eve, the Nazis entered the ghetto. The remaining Jews knew that the Nazis would murder them all and they decided to resist the Nazis to the last, rather than surrender.

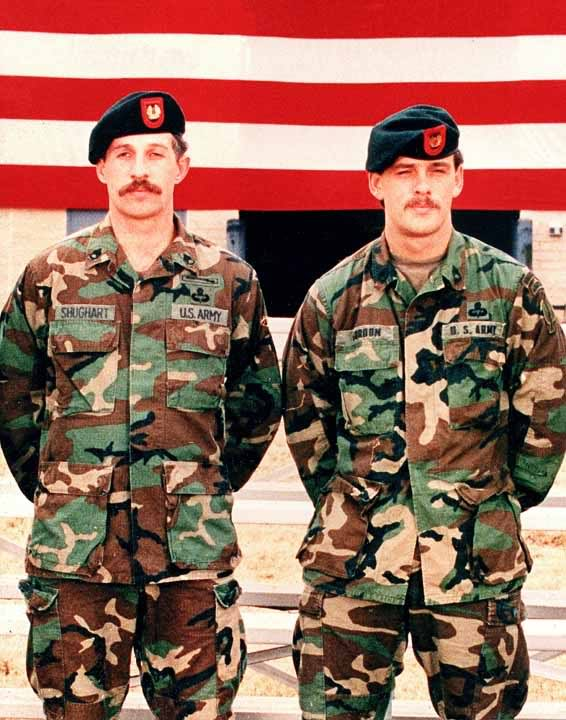
Delta snipers SFC Randy Shughart (left) and MSG Gary Gordon (right)

Another example of a famous last stand was during the First Battle of Mogadishu, where two US 1st SFOD-D snipers, MSG Gary Gordon and SFC Randy Shughart, protected the crash site of helicopter "Super 6-4" and injured pilot Mike Durant, whom they feared would be executed by a crowd of deadly rioters. The two snipers killed 25 and wounded dozens more before they ran out of ammunition and were killed. Their defense, however, allowed Mike Durant to survive long enough for one of the local warlords to take him prisoner. The US was ultimately able to arrange for his release and he was returned home. For their actions, MSG Gordon and SFC Shughart were posthumously awarded the Medal of Honor.

=== Fear of mistreatment ===
People may fight to the death due to the belief that if they surrender they will be tortured or enslaved. At the Siege of Numantia, the inhabitants refused to surrender to the Romans because they were unwilling to become slaves. Japanese soldiers in World War II were told by their superiors that they would be tortured if captured.

=== Protecting leader ===
In some cases, troops will make a last stand to protect their ruler or leader or commander. In the Battle of Hastings in 1066, King Harold II battled the Norman William the Conqueror, who invaded with 7,000 men. After most of the English were killed in the battle, "Harold and his housecarl bodyguard...fought on until an arrow struck the king in the eye." After Harold died, the housecarl bodyguard made a last stand and "...fought to the death around the body of their dead king."

When Rome was attacked in 1527 by the army of the Holy Roman Empire under Emperor Charles V, over 20,000 troops stormed the city. The 189 Swiss Guards made a last stand against the massive army by forming a square around St. Peter's Basilica to give Pope Clement VII time to escape through secret tunnels, and held the doors until Clement could escape.

At the 1795 battle of Krtsanisi, where the Persian army led by Agha Muhammad Khan defeated the Georgians, the Three Hundred Aragvians – a detachment of the highlanders from the Aragvi valley – loyally fought and died in order to enable the escape of King Heraclius II, for which they are remembered as national heroes and were canonized by the Georgian Church.

The Battle of Pavan Khind involved a rearguard last stand. It took place on July 13, 1660, at a mountain pass in the vicinity of fort Vishalgad, near the city of Kolhapur, Maharashtra, India between the Maratha warrior Baji Prabhu Deshpande and Siddi Masud of Adil Shahi dynasty. 300 Marathas in a rearguard action, held off an attacking force of 10,000 Bijapuris, allowing their king Shivaji to escape to a nearby fort. Ultimately the battle ended with the destruction of the rearguard Maratha forces, and a tactical victory for the Adil Shahi Sultanate, but failed to achieve its strategic objective of capturing the Maratha king Shivaji.

The Battle of Chamkaur occurred in 1704 when the tenth Sikh Guru, Guru Gobind Singh, and a small force of 40 Sikhs, was attacked by a much larger force of Mughal soldiers at his fort for his refusal to convert to Islam. The forty Sikhs fought to their death, allowing enough time for the Guru to escape the fort and live another day.

=== Defending tactically crucial point ===
During the second Persian invasion of Greece the Greeks hoped to use the narrow pass of Thermopylae to prevent the vastly large army of the Persians from outflanking them. A Greek force of 7,000 men marched north to block the pass in the middle of 480 BC. The Persian army, ranging between about 100,000 and 150,000, arrived at the pass in late August or early September. During the Battle of Thermopylae, the vastly outnumbered Greeks held off the Persians for seven days (including three of battle) before the rear-guard was annihilated in one of history's most famous last stands. During two full days of battle, the small force led by Leonidas blocked the only road by which the massive Persian army could pass. When Leonidas became aware that his force was being outflanked, he dismissed the bulk of the Greek army and remained to guard their retreat with 300 Spartans, 700 Thespians, 400 Thebans, fighting to the death. Although the Greeks lost the battle, it did check the advance of the Persian army and the delay helped the Greeks prepare a successful defence and ultimately win the war.

An analogous battle, with reversed roles, would be fought 150 years later, during the invasion of the Achaemenid Empire by Alexander the Great: Persians, led by Ariobarzanes of Persis, tried desperately to stop the Macedon offensive towards the capital city Persepolis, blocking the Persian Gates pass.

A similar action to Thermopylae occurred in April 1951 at the Battle of Kapyong when strategic Hill 677 was held by the 700 men of the Canadian 2 PPCLI against two attacking Chinese PVA divisions, encircled and outnumbered by more than 10 to 1 in the immediate battle area, and by about 30 to 1 on the larger battlefield. The PPCLI were exhausted of ammunition and supplies, but the commander Lt. Col. James Riley Stone ordered "no retreat, no surrender", and called in artillery fire on his own positions when they were overrun. The PVA divisions eventually withdrew with about 5,000 dead and a large number wounded.

=== Buying time ===
Sometimes, rather than face annihilation at the hands of a pursuing victorious army, a rearguard will be tasked by the commander of the defeated army with hindering the advance of the victorious army. Even if the rearguard is destroyed in a last stand, its sacrifice may buy their commander time to disengage without losing the majority of his army as happened during the Battle of Roncevaux Pass (778), Battle of Tirad Pass (1899), the Battle of Badgam (1947) which proved to be critical to preventing the fall of Srinagar to tribal lashkars.

=== Perceived duty ===
A last stand may also be the last pitched battle of a war where the position of the defending force is hopeless but the defending force considers it their duty not to surrender until forced to do so, as happened to the last Royalist field army of the First English Civil War at the Battle of Stow-on-the-Wold in 1646.

At the Battle of Saragarhi in 1897, the British Indian contingent consisting of 21 Sikh soldiers of the 36th Sikhs, when faced with insurmountable opposition of 10,000 Afghans, decided to make a last stand in accordance with their traditional and religious belief that duty is above all convictions. All 21 Sikhs were killed, together with approximately 600 Afghans.

== At the end of a siege ==
Before the 20th century, "no quarter was given" if a besieged garrison had refused any offered terms of surrender prior to the attackers breaching the defences, so a last stand was part of the end of many sieges, such as the Battle of the Alamo.

However, since the 1907 IV Hague Convention it is unlawful for an attacking force to kill a garrison if they attempt to surrender, even if it is during the final assault on a fortified position. It is also forbidden to declare that "no quarter will be given".

== Historical significance ==
Last stands loom large in history due to the pull on popular imagination. Historian Nathaniel Philbrick argues:

Long before Custer died at the Little Bighorn, the myth of the Last Stand already had a strong pull on human emotions, and on the way we like to remember history. The variations are endless—from the three hundred Spartans at Thermopylae to Davy Crockett at the Alamo—but they all tell the story of a brave and intractable hero leading his tiny band against a numberless foe. Even though the odds are overwhelming, the hero and his followers fight on nobly to the end and are slaughtered to a man. In defeat the hero of the Last Stand achieves the greatest of victories, since he will be remembered for all time.

During World War I, the expression to fight "with one's back to the wall" became a widely known way to refer to making a last stand. The London Times reported on April 13, 1918, that General Douglas Haig ordered British troops that "Every position must be held to the last man...With our backs to the wall...each one of us must fight on to the end."

== See also ==
- List of last stands
- Pyrrhic victory
