= Occupation of Iran =

Occupation of Iran or Iran occupation may refer to:

- Battle of the Persian Gate
- Battle of Gaugamela
- Muslim conquest of Persia
- Mongol invasion of Khwarezmia and Eastern Iran
- Persian campaign (World War I)
- Anglo-Soviet invasion of Iran
