= Ario =

Ario is a male given name with Persian origin. It may refer to:

== Places ==
- Ario Municipality, Mexico
- Ario de Rosales, main town of Ario Municipality

== Other ==
- Ario Barzan, who was an ancient royal Persian commander who led a last stand of the Persian army against Alexander the Great.
- Ariobarzanes I of Media Atropatene, ruled from 65 BC to 56 BC
- Ariobarzanes II of Atropatene, grandson of Ariobarzanes I, king of Media Atropatene from 20 BC to 8 BC
- Ariobarzanes I of Cappadocia, king of Cappadocia from 93 BC to ca. 63 or 62 BC
- Ario, is the name given to an Iranian warrior a champion amongst men and fought in many wars and lost few". "Ario means honorable" or "noble". in Persia known as "Ario Barzan" and commonly known as Ariobarzanes the Brave, was an Achaemenid prince, satrap and a Persian military commander "
- Ario, is a name for a boy in Persian, Spanish, Greek and Italian that means "Honorable" or "Noble."
- The group of Ito Yokado
- Ario (software), a client for the Music Player Daemon and XMMS2
- Arius, a Christian priest in Alexandria, Egypt in the early fourth century
- Arío, a musician from Costa Rica and former member of Glaciar
- Ario-, Gaulic surname related to the designation "Aryan"
