= Youtab =

Persian noblewoman and warrior

Youtab meaning "unique" in Old Persian (4th century BC – 330 BC) was an ancient Persian noblewoman.

She was the sister of Ariobarzanes, Satrap of Persis. She is notable for fighting alongside her brother against Macedonian King Alexander the Great at the Battle of the Persian Gate in the winter of 330 BC.

In the main sources, the name of Youtab is not found as the sister of Achaemenid Ariobarzanes. The name of Youtab as the sister of Ariobarzanes was mentioned later in the Parthian period, when a person named Ariobarzanes II of Atropatene, who is said to have been the local king of Atropatene had a sister named Iotapa (daughter of Artavasdes I). Regarding Ariobarzen and Youtab, there has been an unknowing family and time shift (anachronism).
