= Battle of Jaxartes =

Battle fought in 329 BC by Alexander the Great against the Saka

- Part of the Wars of Alexander the Great
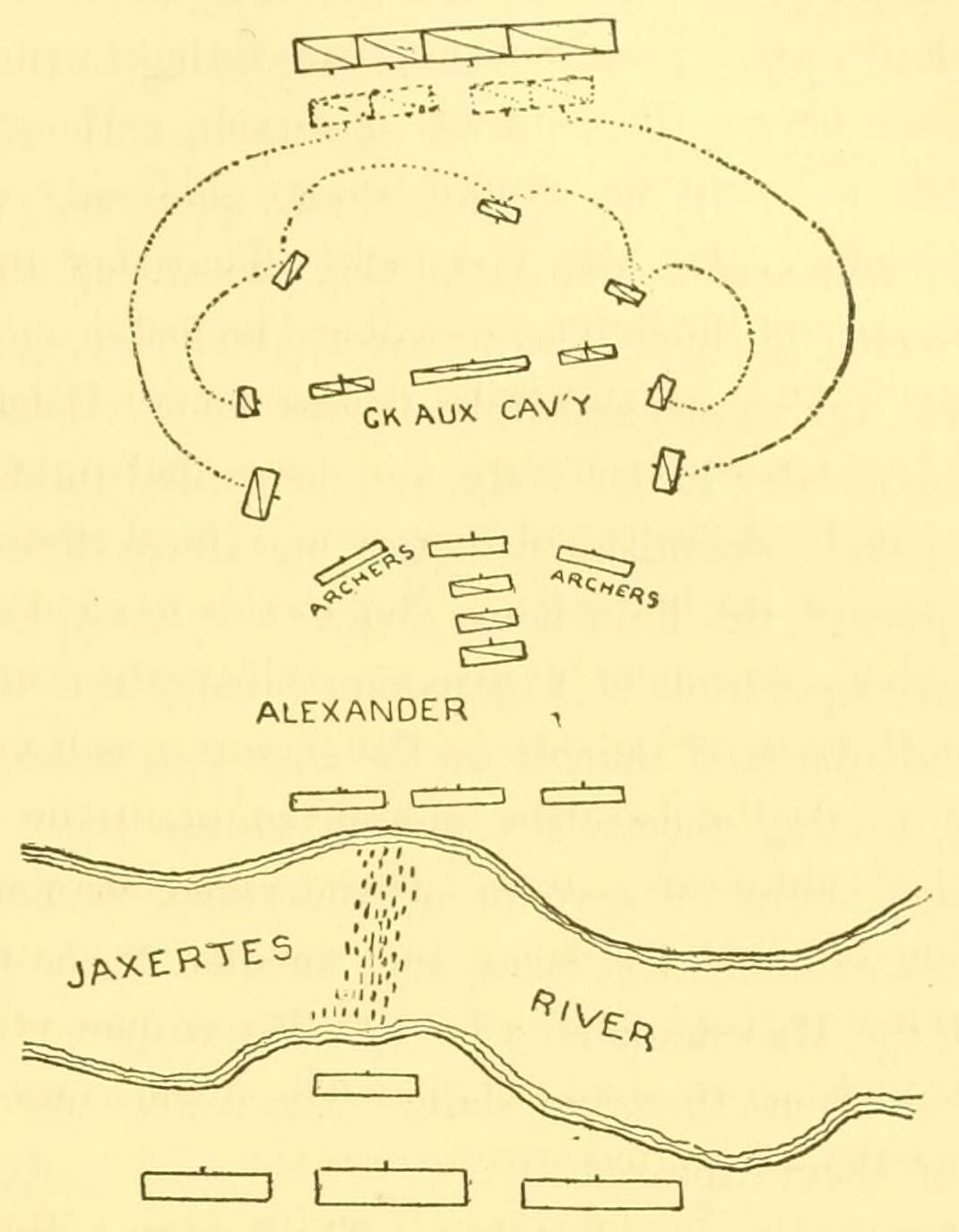
Date	329 BC
Location	Syr Darya 40°17′00″N 69°37′00″E
Result	Macedonian victory

Belligerents
Macedonia; Hellenic League	Saka

Commanders and leaders
Alexander the Great	Satraces †

Strength
6,000	Unknown

Casualties and losses
160 killed 1,000 wounded	1,200 killed 150 captured
- Location of the Battle of Jaxartes

Alexander the Great
current battle

The Battle of Jaxartes was fought in 329 BC by Alexander the Great and his Hellenic (Greek) army against the Saka at the River Jaxartes, now known as the Syr Darya River. The site of the battle straddles the modern borders of Uzbekistan, Tajikistan, Kyrgyzstan, and Kazakhstan, just south-west of the ancient city of Tashkent (the modern capital of Uzbekistan) and north-east of Khujand (a city in Tajikistan).

== Background ==
Crossing the Hellespont in 334 BC, Alexander was determined to become the new monarch of the Achaemenid Empire. First at the Battle of the Granicus, and then at the Battle of Issus, and then finally at the Battle of Gaugamela, he struck a series of blows from which the Achaemenid royal house could not recover.

During the latter two battles, Alexander had been determined to capture Darius. However, Darius had been able to escape in each of these battles. Had Alexander been able to capture Darius, it would have been extremely useful in securing the submission of the majority of the empire. Many of the Achaemenid provinces beyond Mesopotamia were prosperous and well-populated.

After Gaugamela, the Macedonians were obliged to leave the battlefield where they had been victorious almost immediately. The pestilence that the corpses would have wrought on his army could have destroyed it. Alexander marched on Babylon to secure his communications. His intention was to make this the administrative capital of his empire.

== Disposition of the armies ==
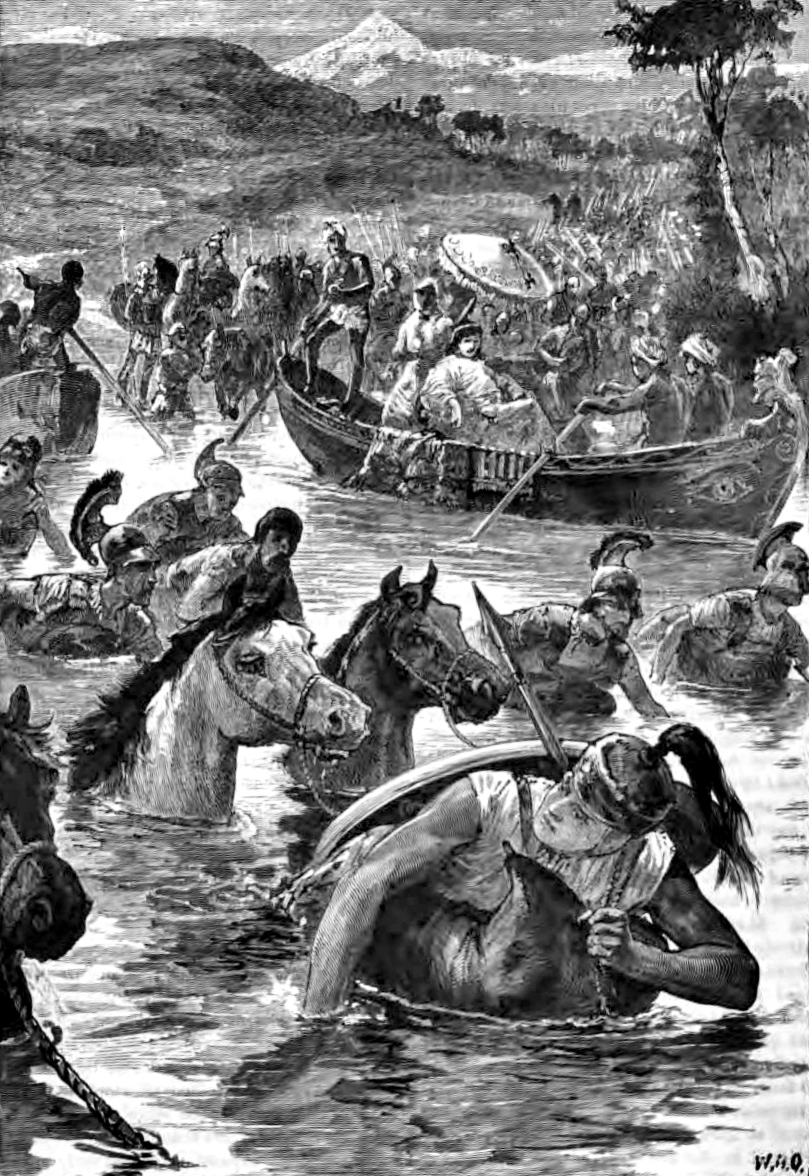
The Macedonians crossing the Jaxartes.

The Saka had occupied the northern bank of the Jaxartes, confident that they could beat Alexander's men as they disembarked, but the Saka underestimated the collaborative abilities of the Macedonian artillery, fleet, cavalry, and infantry. Firstly Alexander ordered that the crossing would take place all at once, so that the mounted enemy archers would be faced with more targets than they could strike at; and he ordered his artillery to cover the soldiers in the ships. (Catapults have a longer range than bows.) This is the first recorded incident of the use of such an approach.

Phase 1

== Battle ==
The Saka were forced from the banks by the powerful catapults and siege bows. For the Macedonians, it was now easy to cross the Jaxartes. In all likelihood the Saka would normally have withdrawn at this point. However, Alexander wanted to neutralise the threat to his borders from the nomad armies once and for all and was not about to let the enemy get away so easily. Therefore, as a second part of his strategy, he ordered a battalion of mounted spear-men to advance and provoke an attack from the horse-lords. The nomads did not recognize this sacrifice for what it was. In their society, in which blood feuds were common, no commander would have sacrificed troops to obtain a better position for the main force. The families of those who had been killed would immediately start a vendetta. Alexander, on the other hand, could send his mounted spear-men on this dangerous mission because his men were well trained and understood that they were not really left alone.

Alexander's vanguard was immediately surrounded and attacked by the Saka mounted archers. Once they were engaged, their position was fixed and they were vulnerable to an approach by the Macedonian infantry and Alexander's cohorts of Cretan archers. The nomads found themselves caught between the Macedonian mounted spear-men and the rest of Alexander's army. The Saka tried to escape to the wings of the Macedonian lines, but there they were met by Alexander's infantry.

Phase 2

Phase 3

== Aftermath and consequences ==
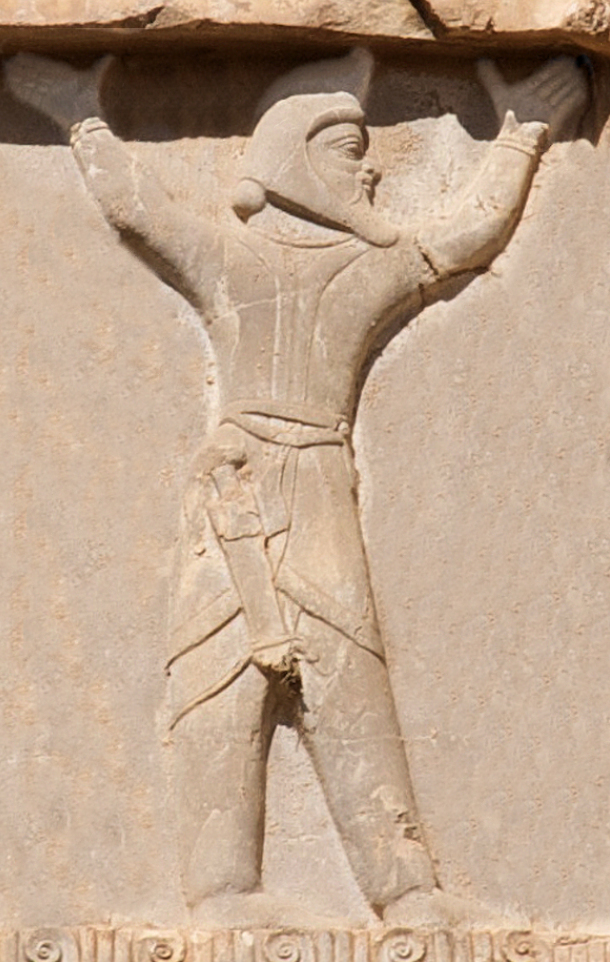
Saka soldier, on the tomb of Xerxes I.

About 1200 Saka were surrounded and killed, including their commander, Satraces. Over 150 prisoners were taken and 1800 horses were captured. As far as the Macedonians knew, no commander had ever been able to pin down and destroy a nomad army besides Alexander's father, Philip II. Philip had defeated the Scythian king Atheas in 339 BC. This was a boost for morale, and a psychological blow for the nomads north of the Jaxartes. Alexander's main aim, however, had never been to subdue the nomads; he wanted to go to the south, where a far more serious crisis demanded his attention. He could do so now without loss of face; and in order to make the outcome acceptable to the Saka, he released the prisoners of war without ransom. This policy was successful: the northern frontier of Alexander's empire no longer faced an immediate threat from the Eurasian nomads.

== Sources ==
- James R. Ashley. The Macedonian Empire: the era of warfare under Philip II and Alexander the Great. McFarland & Company, 2004.
- Arrian. Anabasis Alexandri Book 4.
- Bivar, A. D. H. (1983). "The History of Eastern Iran". In Yarshater, Ehsan (ed.). The Cambridge History of Iran: The Seleucid, Parthian and Sasanian Periods. Vol. 3(1). Cambridge: Cambridge University Press. pp. 181–231. ISBN 0-521-20092-X.
- Dani, A. H.; Bernard, P. (1994). "Alexander and His Successors in Central Asia". In Harmatta, János Harmatta (ed.). History of Civilizations of Central Asia: The Development of Sedentary and Nomadic Civilizations, 700 B. C. to A. D. 250. Vol. 1. UNESCO. pp. 65–96. ISBN 9231028464.
- Dodge, Theodore (1890). Alexander. New York: Da Capo Press. 282-211-2.
