= Battle of the Persian Gate =

Part of the Wars of Alexander the Great

- Part of the Wars of Alexander the Great
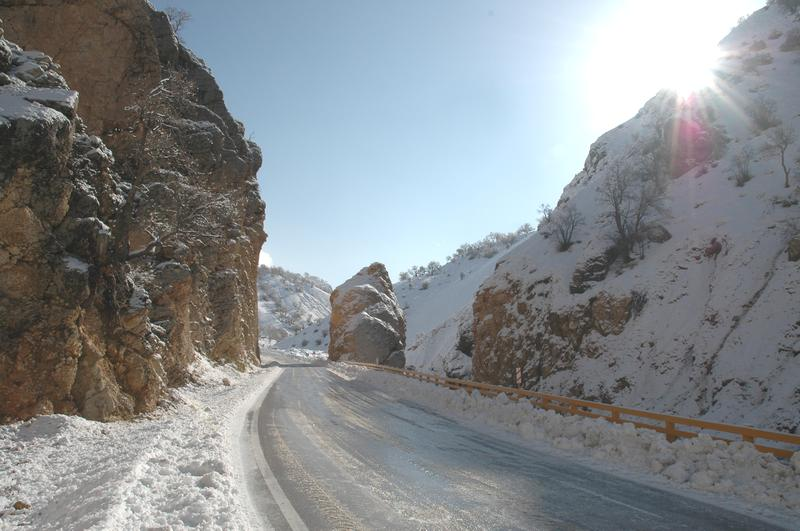
- Highway 78 through the Persian Gate in modern-day Iran, 2012
Date	330 BC
Location	Persian Gate, near Persepolis 30°42′30″N 51°35′55″E
Result	Macedonian victory; Destruction of Persepolis
Territorial changes	Consolidation of control by the Macedonian army over half of Persia proper

Belligerents
Macedonian Empire; Hellenic League	Achaemenid Empire

Commanders and leaders
Alexander the Great; Craterus; Ptolemy; Perdiccas	Ariobarzanes of Persis †; Youtab †

Strength
17,000 picked fighters	40,000 infantry and 700 cavalry (Arrian); 700–2,000 (modern estimates)

Casualties and losses
Unknown, but moderate to heavy	Entire army
- Location within Iran Location within West Asia

Alexander the Great
current battle

The Battle of the Persian Gate took place as part of the Wars of Alexander the Great. In the winter of 330 BC, Ariobarzanes of Persis led a last stand with his outnumbered Persian army at the Persian Gate, near Persepolis, and held back the Macedonian army for approximately a month. However, through captured prisoners of war or a local shepherd, Alexander found a path around to flank the Persian troops from the rear, allowing him to capture half of Persia proper in another decisive victory against the Achaemenid Empire.

== Background ==
The Achaemenid Empire suffered a series of defeats against the Macedonian forces at Granicus (334 BC), Issus (333 BC) and Gaugamela (331 BC), and by the end of 331 BC Alexander had advanced to Babylon and Susa. A Royal Road connected Susa (the first Persian capital city in Elam) with the more eastern capitals of Persepolis and Pasargadae in Persis, and was the natural avenue for Alexander's continued campaign. Meanwhile, King Darius III was trying to raise a new army at Ecbatana. Ariobarzanes was charged with preventing the Macedonian advance into Persis. He relied heavily on the terrain Alexander needed to pass through. There were only a few possible routes through the Zagros Mountains, which were made more hazardous by winter's onset.

After the conquest of Susa, Alexander split the Macedonian army into two parts. Alexander's general, Parmenion, took one half along the Royal Road, and Alexander himself took the route towards Persis. Passing into Persis required traversing the Persian Gates, a narrow mountain pass that lent itself easily to ambush.

During his advance, Alexander subdued the Uxii, a local hill people that had demanded the same tribute from him they used to receive from the Persian kings for safe passage. As he passed into the Persian Gates, he met with no resistance. Believing that he would not encounter any more enemy forces during his march, Alexander neglected to send scouts ahead of his vanguard and thus walked into Ariobarzanes' ambush.

The valley leading up to the Persian Gate is wide, allowing the Macedonian army to enter the mountains at a full march. Ariobarzanes occupied a position near the modern-day village of Cheshmeh Chenar. The road curves to the southeast (to face the rising sun) and narrows considerably at that point, making the terrain particularly treacherous, thus well suited for Ariobarzanes's purposes. According to the historian Arrian, Ariobarzanes had a force of 40,000 infantry and 700 cavalry and faced a Macedonian force of over 10,000. However, some modern historians have claimed these figures for the Achaemenid force to be grossly exaggerated and implausible. Encyclopædia Iranica suggests defenders, as few as 700, and no more than 2000, based on the maximum number of troops likely at Ariobarzanes' disposal, but it notes that most modern historians follow Arrian, Curtius, and Diodorus unreservedly.

== Battle ==
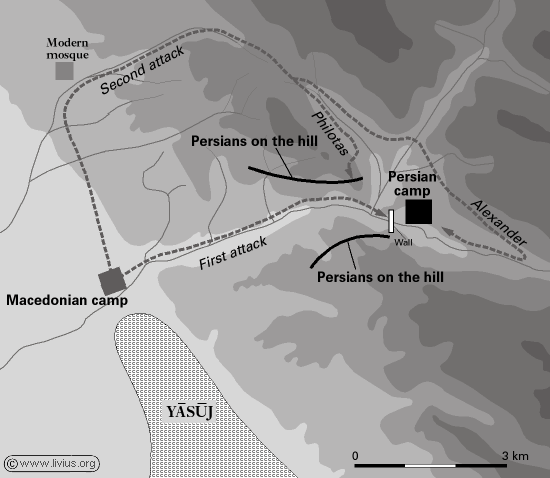
Map of the Persian Gate

The Persian Gate was only a couple of meters wide at the ambush point. Once the Macedonian army had advanced far enough into the narrow pass, the Persians rained down boulders on them from the northern slopes. From the southern slope, Persian archers launched their projectiles. Alexander's army initially suffered heavy casualties, losing entire platoons at a time. The Macedonians attempted to withdraw, but the terrain and their still-advancing rear guard made an orderly retreat impossible. Alexander was forced to leave his dead behind to save the rest of his army—a great mark of disgrace to the Macedonians and to other Greeks, who valued highly the recovery and proper burial of their fallen.

Ariobarzanes had some reason to believe that success here could change the course of the war. Preventing Alexander's passage through the Persian Gates would force the Macedonian army to use other routes to invade Persia proper, all of which would allow Darius more time to field another army and possibly stop the Macedonian invasion altogether.

Ariobarzanes held the pass for a month, but Alexander succeeded in encircling the Persians in a pincer attack with Ptolemy and Perdiccas and broke through the Persian defenses. Alexander and his elite contingent then attacked Ariobarzanes from above in a surprise attack until the Persians could no longer block the pass. Accounts of how he did so vary widely. Curtius and Arrian both report that prisoners of war led Alexander through the mountains to the rear of the Persian position, while a token force remained in the Macedonian camp under the command of Craterus.

"[The Persians]...Fought a memorable fight... Unarmed as they were, they seized the armed men in their embrace, and dragging them down to the ground... Stabbed most of them with their own weapons."

Diodorus and Plutarch generally concur with this assessment, although their numbers vary widely. Modern historians W. Heckel and Stein also lend credence to this argument. Although precise figures are unavailable, some historians say that this engagement cost Alexander his greatest losses in the Persian campaign.

According to some accounts, Ariobarzanes and his surviving companions were trapped, but rather than surrender, they charged straight into the Macedonian lines. One account states that Ariobarzanes was killed in the last charge, while Arrian's version reports that Ariobarzanes escaped to the north, where he finally surrendered to Alexander with his companions. Modern historian J. Prevas maintains that Ariobarzanes and his forces retreated to Persepolis, where they found the city gates closed by Tiridates, a Persian noble and guardian of the royal treasury under Darius III, who had been in secret contact with Alexander the Great. Tiridates considered resisting Alexander's forces to be futile, and so allowed Alexander to massacre Ariobarzanes and his troops right outside the city walls rather than fight. This is in agreement with Curtius' account which states that the Persian force, after both inflicting and suffering heavy casualties in the ensuing battle, broke through the Macedonian forces and retreated to Persepolis, but were denied entrance into the capital, at which point they returned to fight Alexander's army to the death.

A few historians regard the Battle of the Persian Gate as the most serious challenge to Alexander's conquest of Persia. Michael Wood has called the battle decisive and A. B. Bosworth refers to it as a "complete and decisive victory for Alexander".

== Aftermath ==
Similarities between the battle fought at Thermopylae and the Persian Gates have been recognized by ancient and modern authors. The Persian Gates played the role "of a Persian Thermopylae and like Thermopylae it fell." The Battle of the Persian Gates served as a kind of reversal of the Battle of Thermopylae, fought in Greece in 480 BC in an attempt to hold off the invading Persian forces. Here, on Alexander's campaign to avenge the Persian invasion of Greece, he faced the same situation from the Persians. There are also accounts that an Iranian shepherd led Alexander's forces around the Persian defenses, just as a local Greek showed the Persian forces a secret path around the pass at Thermopylae.

The defeat of Ariobarzanes' forces at the Persian Gate removed the last military obstacle between Alexander and Persepolis. Upon his arrival at the city of Persepolis, Alexander appointed a general named Phrasaortes as successor of Ariobarzanes. Alexander seized the treasury of Persepolis, which at the time held the largest concentration of wealth in the world, and guaranteed himself financial independence from the Greek states. Four months later, Alexander allowed the troops to loot Persepolis, kill all its men and enslave all its women, perhaps as a way to fulfill the expectations of his army and the Greek citizens, or perhaps as a final act of vengeance towards the Persians. This destruction of the city can be viewed as unusual, as its inhabitants had surrendered without a fight and Alexander had earlier left Persian cities he conquered, such as Susa, relatively untouched. In May 330 BC, Alexander ordered the terrace of Persepolis, including its palaces and royal audience halls, to be burned before he left to find Darius III. Sources disagree as to why he ordered the destruction: it could have been a deliberate act of revenge for the burning of the Acropolis of Athens during the second Persian invasion of Greece, an impulsive, drunken act, or it could have been out of Alexander's supposed anger over not being recognized as the legitimate successor to Darius III.
