= Phrasaortes =

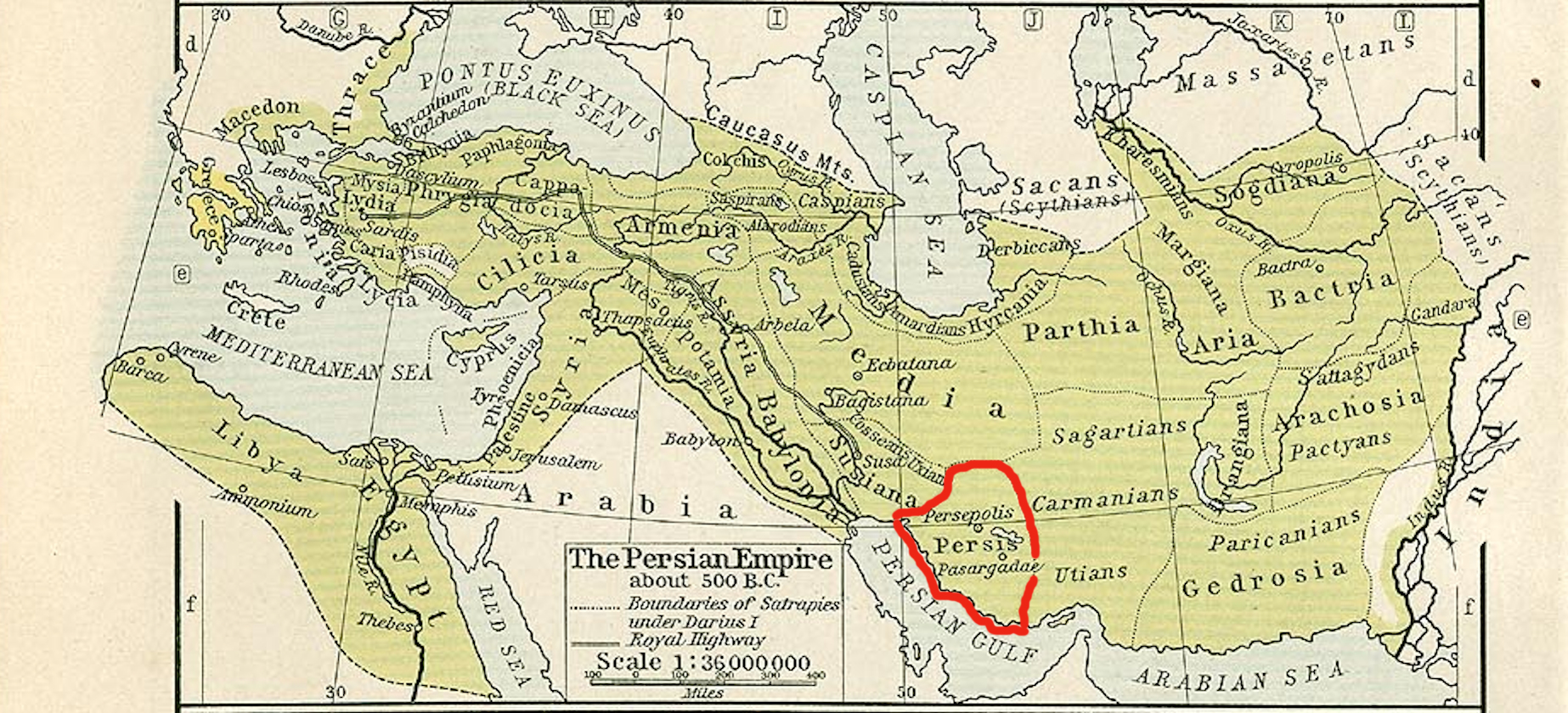
Phrasaortes was named satrap of Persis by Alexander

Phrasaortes (Ancient Greek: Φρασαόρτης, romanized: Phrasaórtēs) was a Persian satrap of Persis under Alexander the Great c. 330 BCE. He was a son of Rheomithres. Phrasaortes replaced the Achaemenid satrap Ariobarzanes, who had confronted Alexander at the Battle of the Persian Gate, where he was killed.

Phrasaortes died at some point before the return of Alexander from India in 324 BCE. He was replaced by Orxines, a Persian noble, without the permission of Alexander, in a direct challenge to Alexander's authority. Orxines was executed by Alexander, and replaced by the Macedonian general Peucestas.
