= Madates =

- Born: 4th century BC
- Era: Classical

Madates (Ancient Greek: Μαδάτης) or Madetas (Ancient Greek: Μαδέτας) was a general of Darius III and was married to a niece of Sisygambis (the mother of Darius). He was leading the Uxii.

He was supposedly ethnically Persian, but it is not unlikely he was Uxian. The idea that being a Persian ruling a non-Persian tribe "seems strange but has rarely received much attention from scholars." Diodorus Siculus and Quintus Curtius Rufus mention him.

Madates tried to fight Alexander the Great, but the Uxians were at first reluctant. He defended a strong mountain fortress of the Uxii against Alexander but was defeated. After the entreaties of Sisygambis, he was pardoned by Alexander.
