= Uxii =

Tribal confederation based in Zagros mountains

The Uxii (Ancient Greek: Οὔξιοι) were a tribal confederation of non-Iranian semi-nomadic people who lived somewhere in the Zagros Mountains. They were classified by Nearchus as among the four predatory peoples of the southwest along with the Mardi, Sousii, and Elymaei. They raided the settled people of Iran and raised sheep. The Uxii also tolled passing armies until they were defeated by Alexander the Great at the Battle of the Uxian Defile. After some time, the Uxians regained independence. Some think that the tolling was a gift tradition from the Persian kings to local tribes, and wasn't forced (especially as the need for Darius to go out of his way to pay the "toll"). Greek authors may have misinterpreted the practice or spun it to make Darius look weak. Achaemenid policy on people such as the Uxii involved gift giving and condensing tribal confederations together and then setting up a loyal ruler for that tribe.

During Alexander's conquest of Persia, the Uxians were led by Madates. They could be divided into two groups, one which lived in the plains and was sedentary and one which lived in the mountains and was nomadic. The plain Uxians surrendered to Alexander, while the Mountain Uxians demanded a toll. The division of the Uxians into a sedentary and nomadic component is similar to many other tribes of the Middle East and Central Asia.

The Uxii may have come from Khuzistan and as such are likely related to the Elymaei and Elamites.

The mother of Darius III, Sisygambis, was likely Uxian in origin, and later negotiated the release of Uxian prisoners headed by Madates.
