= Persian Gates =

Persian Gate
- Susian Gate
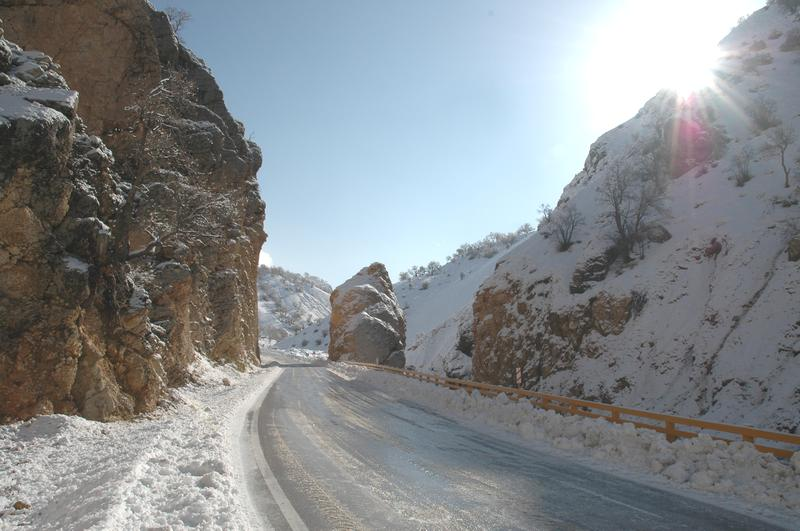
- Highway 78 (built circa 1990s) through the Persian Gate

- Location within Iran

Third Approach
- Location: Kohgiluyeh va Boyer Ahmad and Fars
- Range: Zagros Mountains
- Coordinates: 30°42′30″N 51°35′55″E

Persian Gate or the Susian Gate was an ancient name of the pass now known as Tang-e Meyran, connecting Yasuj with Sedeh Eghlid to the east, crossing the border of the modern Kohgiluyeh va Boyer Ahmad and Fars provinces of Iran, passing south of the Kuh-e-Dinar massif, part of the Zagros Mountains.

The pass controls the link between the shore and the central part of Persia.

In the early weeks of 330 BC, it was the site of the fierce Battle of the Persian Gate, in which the Macedonian king Alexander the Great faced stiff resistance by the last Achaemenid troops commanded by Ariobarzan.
