= Rheomithres =

4th-century BC Persian noble

Rheomithres (Old Persian: *Raivamiθrah; Ancient Greek: Ῥεομίθρης Rheomíthrēs) was a Persian noble. He was father of several children, including Phrasaortes whom Alexander the Great appointed satrap of Persis in 330 BC.

He joined in the Great Satraps' Revolt of the western Persian provinces from Artaxerxes II, in 362 BC, and was employed by his confederates to go to Tachos, pharaoh of Egypt, for aid. He came back with 500 talents and 50 warships and he is supposed to have left his wife and his children to Tachos as a guarantee for his assistance. Nevertheless, Rheomithres betrayed the rebels and he invited a number of them in a meeting. On their arrival, he arrested them, and despatched them in chains to Artaxerxes to receive the bounties, thus making his own peace at court.

Rheomithres took part in the battle of the Granicus, in 334 BC, where he was in command of a body of 2,000 cavalry on the right wing, between 1,000 Medes and 2,000 Bactrians. He survived the battle and the next year he joined Darius at the battle of Issus (modern-day Turkey), where he lost his life.

== Sources ==
- Smith, William (1878). A New Classical Dictionary of Greek and Roman Biography Mythology and Geography Partly Based Upon the Dictionary of Greek and Roman Biography and Mythology. Harper.
- Heckel, Waldemar (2006). Who's Who in the Age of Alexander the Great: Prosopography of Alexander's Empire. Blackwell Publishing.
