= Ariobarzanes of Persis =

Achaemenid prince, satrap and Persian military commander

Aryobarzanes of Persis
- Aryābr̥zaⁿs
- Died: 330 BC probably near Persepolis
- Relatives: Father: Artabazus
- Military career
- Allegiance: Achaemenid Empire
- Service years: 331–330 BC
- Rank: Satrap of Persis
- Conflicts: Battle of Gaugamela; Commanding the Persian Army at the Battle of the Persian Gates †

Aryobarzanes (Old Persian: *Aryābr̥zaⁿs; Ancient Greek: Ἀριοβαρζάνης Aryobarzánēs; Persian: آریوبرزن; died 330 BC), was an Achaemenid prince, satrap and a Persian military commander who led an ambush of the Persian army to resist against the invasion of Macedonian King Alexander the Great at the Battle of the Persian Gate in January 330 BC.

== Life ==
The exact birth date and early life of Ariobarzanes is unknown. His sister was the ancient Persian noblewoman and warrior Youtab, who fought alongside him, and was likely slain, at the Battle of the Persian Gate. Ariobarzanes was appointed as the first satrap of Persis (the southern province of Fars in present-day Iran) in 335 BC by Darius III Codomannus. Historians are surprised that Darius III appointed satrap of Persepolis and Persis; apparently, that office did not previously exist. Ariobarzanes commanded part of the Persian Army fighting against the Macedonians at the Battle of Gaugamela in 331 BC. Following the Persian defeat at Gaugamela, Darius III realized he could not aptly defend his royal capital of Persepolis and the ancestral capital of Pasargadae. Thus, Darius traveled east to rebuild his armies, leaving Ariobarzanes in command of the remaining Persian forces guarding the passes through the Zagros Mountains into the Persian heartland.

== Death ==
After the Battle of Gaugamela, Alexander split his army and led his 14,000-strong force towards the Persian capital via the Persian Gates. There Ariobarzanes successfully ambushed Alexander's army, inflicting heavy casualties. The Persian success at the Battle of the Persian Gate was short-lived though; after being held off for 30 days, Alexander outflanked and destroyed the defenders. Some sources indicate that the Persians were betrayed by a captured tribal chief who showed the Greeks an alternate path that allowed them to outflank Ariobarzanes in a reversal of Thermopylae. Ariobarzanes managed to escape, but when he reached Persepolis, he was denied entrance to the city. The commander of the city's garrison had noted the outcome of the battle, and was convinced that Alexander was bound to win the throne of the empire. Ariobarzanes made his last stand at the Persian Gates; and was likely killed by the advancing Macedonian army. Afterward, Alexander continued towards Persepolis, seizing the city and its treasury, and eventually looting the city months after its fall.

Alexander replaced him with Phrasaortes as Hellenistic satrap of Persis.

== See also ==
- Battle of the Persian Gate
