= Alexander the Great (1956 film) =

1956 film by Robert Rossen

- Theatrical release poster
- Directed by: Robert Rossen
- Written by: Robert Rossen
- Produced by: Robert Rossen
- Starring: Richard Burton; Fredric March; Claire Bloom; Danielle Darrieux
- Cinematography: Robert Krasker
- Edited by: Ralph Kemplen
- Music by: Mario Nascimbene
- Production companies: Rossen Films; C.B. Films S.A.
- Distributed by: United Artists
- Release dates: March 22, 1956; (Royal World Premiere, London)
- Running time: 147 minutes (pre-release version); 136 minutes (general release version)
- Countries: United States; Spain
- Language: English
- Budget: $4 million
- Box office: $2.5 million

Alexander the Great is a CinemaScope and Technicolor 1956 epic historical drama film about the life of Macedonian general and king Alexander the Great written, produced and directed by Robert Rossen. Filmed in Spain, it was released by United Artists and stars Richard Burton as Alexander along with a large ensemble cast. Italian composer Mario Nascimbene contributed the film score.

== Plot ==
The Greek orator Demosthenes of Athens is advocating war to resist King Philip II of Macedon and his planned invasion and takeover of all the city-states of Greece.

While Philip II is leading a campaign to take over Olynthus, he is informed that his spouse Olympias has borne him a son who, she claims, is "a god born of a god." Philip is angry because he suspects that Olympias has committed adultery and that she was not impregnated by a god. However, General Parmenio advises the king to let Alexander grow up and succeed him.

While growing up, Alexander receives instruction in history, mathematics, logic and other subjects from Aristotle in Mieza. Alexander is eager to rule and tells his tutor that like Achilles he would rather have a "short life with glory" than a "long life of obscurity." Philip then decides to send Alexander to the Macedonian capital, Pella, as a regent to rule the city while Philip is away fighting wars. This is done to prevent Olympias from spreading rumors about her husband's death. Alexander uses this opportunity to rule in his own right — he becomes a pawn of neither his mother nor his father. Alexander later joins Philip and they go on campaigns of conquest together against cities such as Athens in the Battle of Chaeronea in 338 BC. After the battle is won, Alexander demands that no Greek city-state ever bear arms against Pella and that they supply men, arms, and ships for the war against Persia.

Philip divorces Olympias, accusing her of "unfaithfulness", and marries Attalus's niece Eurydice, thereby making her the new queen. This move creates a chasm between Alexander and his father, not only because Alexander's mother has been repudiated but also because his succession hangs in the balance since some men in Philip's court see him as a bastard.

After Philip and his court mock Pausanias, a loyal friend of Alexander, for his great devotion to Alexander, Pausanias, with implied encouragement from Olympias, assassinates Philip, whereupon Alexander kills Pausanias then and there. Eurydice commits suicide, or her murder by Olympias is made to look like suicide; and Olympias has Eurydice's son by Philip, Caranus, thrown into a fire. At this juncture, Alexander claims the loyalty of all Macedonians and assumes the titles of his father. He tells the Macedonians that the Treaty of Corinth still stands. Memnon is exiled for not pledging his loyalty to Alexander.

Alexander embarks on his mission to conquer the whole of Asia. Memnon, who is now in Darius III's court, advises him to retreat strategically and attack Alexander when his supplies run out. However, the lords of Persia underestimate the "boy" Alexander and resolve to fight him at the river Granicus.

After the victory at the Granicus, Alexander goes to Phrygia and solves the challenge of the knot tied by King Gordias by cutting it with his sword.

Before the battle in Babylon, Alexander states that the lunar eclipse which some of his men thought was a bad omen means that "the Persian moon will be eclipsed by the Macedonian Sun" with which Aristander the seer agrees. After being defeated, Darius III flees to the Caspian Gates to build a new army, but his dispirited commanders kill him. In his will, Darius tells Alexander, "Take my daughter, Roxane, for your wife...that our worlds may become as one." Alexander then orders Persian lords who had committed regicide to be impaled upon stakes for their betrayal of their king.

At a drunken revelry in Babylon, Alexander declares, "I am the son of God" (Zeus) and "the world is my domain....We will march to the end of the world." In Athens, news reaches that Alexander is in India and is conquering there, whereupon Aeschines proclaims, "He has outdone the gods."

Alexander takes his status to heart, his arrogance and paranoia increasing to unstable proportions, but the bold young leader's conquests come to an end after he kills his close friend, Cleitus, with his spear following a drunken argument. Grief-stricken and humbled, Alexander returns to Babylon from India, losing many of his men in the process. He marries Roxane at Susa, but falls ill soon after, and asks that his corpse be thrown into the Euphrates to disappear, so that people will think his body went back to the gods. When asked upon his deathbed to whom he will leave his empire, Alexander whispers, "To the strongest."

== Cast ==
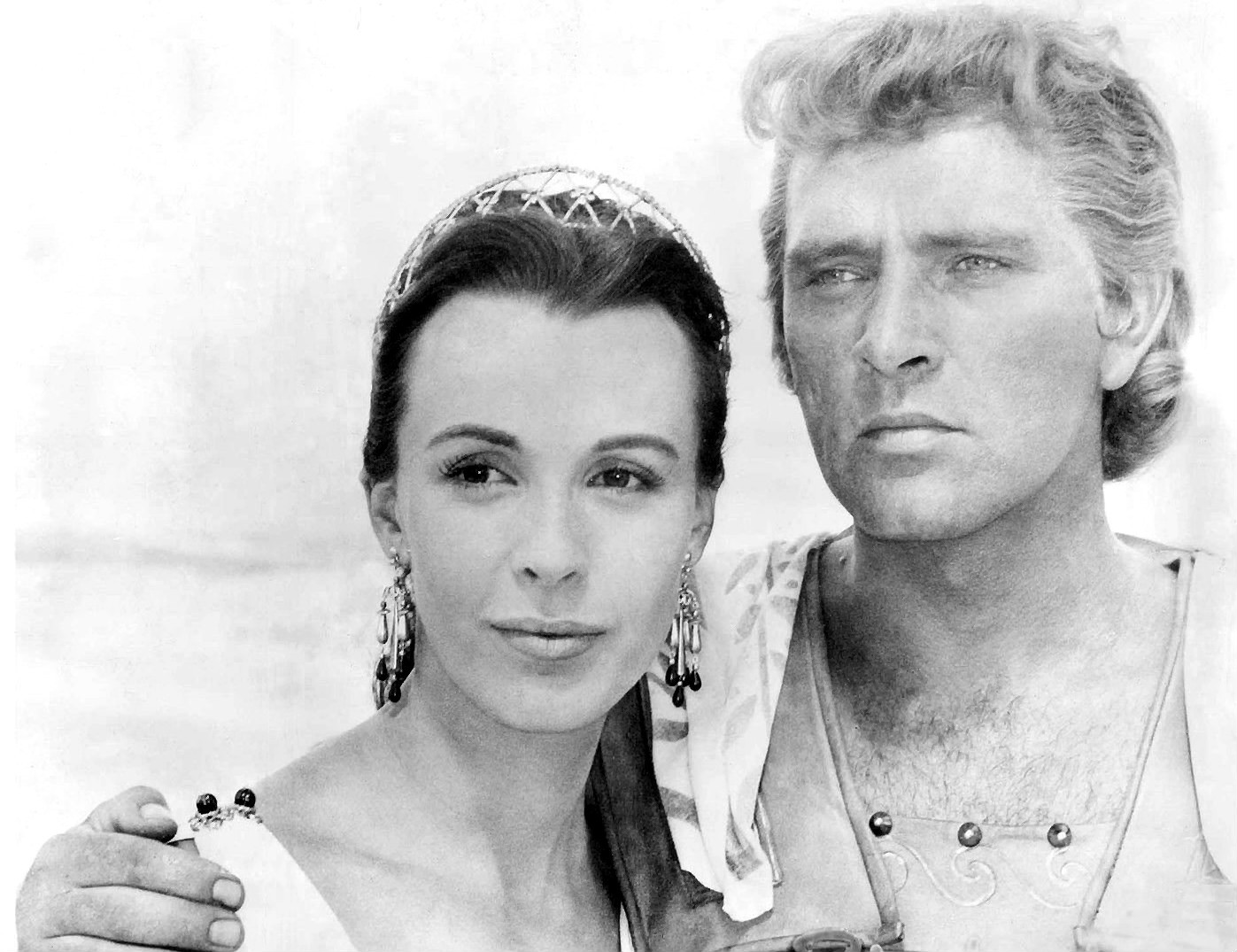
Claire Bloom and Richard Burton

- Richard Burton as Alexander the Great
- Fredric March as Philip II
- Claire Bloom as Barsine
- Danielle Darrieux as Olympias
- Barry Jones as Aristotle
- Harry Andrews as Darius
- Stanley Baker as Attalus
- Niall MacGinnis as Parmenion
- Peter Cushing as Memnon
- Michael Hordern as Demosthenes
- Marisa de Leza as Eurydice
- Gustavo Rojo as Cleitus the Black
- Rubén Rojo as Philotas
- Peter Wyngarde as Pausanias
- Helmut Dantine as Nectenabus
- William Squire as Aeschines
- Friedrich von Ledebur as Antipater
- Virgílio Teixeira as Ptolemy
- Teresa del Río as Roxana
- Julio Peña as Arsites
- José Nieto as Spithridates
- Carlos Baena as Nearchus
- Larry Taylor as Perdiccas
- José Marco as Harpalus
- Ricardo Valle as Hephaestion
- Carmen Carulla as Stateira
- Jesús Luque as Aristander
- Ramsay Ames as Drunken woman
- Ellen Rossen as Amytis
- Carlos Acevedo as Ochus

== Production ==
Charlton Heston was offered the role of Alexander, but turned it down, stating "Alexander is the easiest kind of picture to make badly". Richard Burton had previously attempted to play Hephaestion in Terence Rattigan's Adventure Story, but was fired. He later played Mark Antony in the historical epic Cleopatra. Barry Jones initially declined the role of Aristotle four times, but accepted the fifth time after suggesting his own salary.

Robert Rossen started work on the film in 1952. The film was shot in Spain over 110 days from February to July 1955, using Technicolor and CinemaScope. Rossen considered using VistaVision and used British actors for test footage. The film was shot at the Sevilla Studio in Madrid. El Molar was used to depict Pella, El Vellón was used for Persepolis and Athens, and Alexander's battles were shot in Spanish Morocco. The scene depicting the Battle of Chaeronea and Battle of Gaugamela were shot using the Sierra de Guadarrama and the Battle of the Granicus was shot at the river Jarama. The film cost $4 million.

The sets were designed by André Andrejew and the costumes were designed by David Ffolkes. 11,000 costumes were made for the film and one battle sequence had 6,500 spears, 4,000 shields, 430 horses, and 42 chariots. Burton's costumes cost $87,500. 5,000 extras were used for the film and 1,000 cavalry horses were loaned from the Spanish military. The film's soundtrack was done in Rome.

Prince Peter of Greece and Denmark served as a historical adviser for the film. The film has multiple historical inaccuracies. Its usage of sigma in its opening titles produces Alsxander the Grsat and the location names on maps in the film are in Latin. Alexander's armor is inspired by later Roman armor. Alexander is also portrayed as exclusively heterosexual. Memnon was depicted as an Athenian rather than as a Rhodian and Roxane was depicted as the daughter of Darius rather than Oxyartes. Historian Robin Lane Fox, who worked on Oliver Stone's Alexander, was critical of the film.

== Release ==
David Ballard, who was seven feet and seven inches tall, was dressed as Alexander to advertise the film. United Artists spent $1 million to advertise the film, with $251,000 being spent on magazine and newspaper advertisements. Thirteen pages were taken out in Life to advertise the film and a comic book adaption was published.

United Artists sought a box office of $20 million and $7 million was required to break even. Alexander the Great replaced Carousel as the highest-grossing movie in theaters for one week in April 1956, before falling to second place behind Carousel the next week. The film earned $2.5 million by the end of 1956, making it the 32nd highest-grossing film of that year.

The National Legion of Decency listed the film was "morally unobjectionable for general patronage".

== Reception ==
On the review aggregator Rotten Tomatoes, the film has an approval rating of 8% derived from 12 reviews, with an average rating of 3.5/10.

A. H. Weiler of The New York Times wrote that despite the film's length "its moments of boredom are rare," and that the battle scenes "make a colorful and thunderous show." He added, "As Alexander, Richard Burton contributes a serious and impassioned portrayal of a man inspired by but still repelled by his father." William Brogdon of Variety wrote that the film had some "long, dull stretches" but "Rossen reaches screen-filling heights with his battle-assemblages, jamming the 2.55-1 anamorphic ratio to its very edges with scene after scene of mass warfare." In his write-up of the Los Angeles premiere, Edwin Schallert stated: "The initial audience had a chance to view some very powerful individual portrayals by Burton, March and others and to witness some overwhelmingly big and spectacular battle and crowd scenes. However, as a piece of storytelling, historical or otherwise, mainly revolving around the title character as a great conqueror for Greece, the film seemed to run off in a dozen and one different directions at practically every stage."

Richard L. Coe of The Washington Post wrote that the film "is, for a movie, so remarkably faithful to historical fact that it is more the pity that, as a movie, it is so boring ... Such is the power of detailed pictures that repetition of battle scenes, leave-takings, orations and intrigue simply becomes dizzyingly meaningless." Harrison's Reports wrote, "Beautifully photographed in CinemaScope and Technicolor, it is without a doubt one of the most opulently mounted pictures ever produced, a magnificent eye-filling epic with a scope and splendor that is alone worth the price of admission to see." John McCarten of The New Yorker wrote that "while the picture has plenty of interesting pageantry, it doesn't offer quite enough drama to hold one's attention for its full length—a matter of two and a half hours. Far too much of that time is spent in detailing the Macedonian's unhappy youth." The Monthly Film Bulletin wrote, "Conviction is considerably dissipated here by Rossen's refusal, in spite of obviously serious intentions, to present character in terms much more convincing than those of comic strip history ... The battle sequences are well composed, but the generally pedestrian style and approach of the production ultimately reduce Alexander the Great to a well-intentioned historical jamboree, protracted and intermittently quite enjoyable."

Hartley Ramsay, writing in the National Board of Reviews, criticized Burton's performance as "petulant and passionless" and its runtime, but stated that the film was "interesting and worth seeing". The review by The Guardian criticized its unfocused and broad story stating that had Rossen "been less ambitious he might have made a memorable work" and that "the result is a great, unwieldy blunderbuss of a film". Alan Brien stated that "Like The Conqueror and Helen of Troy it is an epic that suffers from elephantiasis". The Chicago Tribune's review, written under the pseudonym Mae Tinee, praised the film as "frequently remarkably effective" and that it was "a massive, meaty film, with both the advantages and the handicaps of any efforts to portray ancient history".

R.H. Gardner, writing in The Baltimore Sun, criticized the film as "frequently slow-moving, difficult to follow and cluttered with confusing details", but that it was "perhaps as close to being great as any film-historical since the Olivier production of Shakespeare's Henry V". He stated that Rossen's writing of Alexander "slows down and confuses the action on the one hand, but, on the other, lifts the film from the ranks of the average unimaginative, overblown historical to a position of some distinction". He also praised the costumes, sets, and battle sequences.

Jay Carmody, writing in The Evening Star, praised the cast. Myles Standish, writing in the St. Louis Post-Dispatch, praised Burton's performance and Rossen's writing.

== Comic book adaptation ==
- Dell Four Color #688 (May 1956)

== See also ==
- List of American films of 1956
- List of historical drama films
- List of United Artists films

== Works cited ==
- Munn, Michael (2008). Richard Burton: Prince of Players. Skyhorse Publishing. ISBN 9781602393554.
- Nisbet, Gideon (2008). Ancient Greece in Film and Popular Culture (2 ed.). Bristol Phoenix Press. ISBN 9781904675785.
- Ramsay, Hartley (1956). "Alexander the Great". National Board of Review. Vol. 7, no. 5.
- Solomon, Jon (2001). The Ancient World in the Cinema. Yale University Press. ISBN 9780300083378.
- "Rossen's London Test". Variety. Vol. 196, no. 12. 1954.
- "Angles on 'Alex'; Greece Couldn't Handle Filming". Variety. Vol. 201, no. 3. 1955.
- "Mags, Supps Share Of 'Alex' Ads, $251,000". Variety. Vol. 201, no. 11. 1956.
- "National Boxoffice Survey". Variety. Vol. 202, no. 6. 1956.
- "Estimated Grosses of Past Year". Variety. Vol. 205, no. 5. 1957.
- "UA's Giant $1,000,000 Program Builds Big "Alexander" Audience". Motion Picture Herald. Vol. 203, no. 2. 1956.
- "Legion Approves 10 of 13 New Productions". Motion Picture Herald. Vol. 203, no. 3. 1956.
- "Three Years Research Pays Off For Rossen". Motion Picture Exhibitor. Vol. 55, no. 16. 1956.
- "Film's Campaign Boon For Spain". Life. Vol. 39, no. 20. 1955.
