= Aristander =

Aristander of Telmessos (Greek: Ἀρίστανδρος ο Τελμησσεύς; born c. 380 BCE, fl. 2nd half of 4th century BCE), a Greek from Caria, was Alexander the Great's favorite seer.

== Life ==
Aristander belonged to the entourage of Alexander's father, Philip II of Macedon, in 357/6, when he correctly interpreted a dream as revealing Olympias' pregnancy. The ancient sources place him interpreting omens from the conqueror's birth to his death. Although details are variously given, and some incidents are fictitious, Aristander was clearly an influential presence during Alexander's campaigns, and played an important role in uplifting the morale of the Macedonian army. There are indications he wrote divinatory works, either before, during or after the expedition, although it is also possible these works were spuriously attributed.

== Aristander in the sources ==
A represents Arrian, P Plutarch, C Curtius, D Diodorus, J Justin, S Strabo, I the Itinerarium Alexandri. Passages in which Aristander is mentioned by name are marked with an asterisk (*).

1. Philip dreams he sealed up the womb of his wife Olympias, and that the seal bore a lion device. Aristander interprets the dream optimistically – that the child Olympias bore (Alexander) would be lion-like and brave. (*P 2.2–3; Ephorus, see FGrH 70, 217)
2. Statue of Orpheus in Pieria sweats. Aristander interprets optimistically that it means Alexander will cause poets and musicians much sweat in reciting and celebrating his deeds. (*A 1.11.1–2; *P 14.5; I 17; Pseudo-Callisthenes, Alexander Romance 1.42)
3. Army comes across a fallen statue of Ariobarzanes, former satrap of Phrygia. The seer “Alexander” [Aristander?] interprets predicts the victory at Granicus. (D 17.17.6–7)
4. An insistent swallow bothers the drowsing Alexander at Halicarnassus. Aristander interprets the event to mean that a plot will be revealed to Alexander. (*A 1.25.6–8)
5. Macedonian soldiers engaged in the siege of Tyre discover that some of the ration bread is “bloody.” Aristander forecasts that Tyre will be taken (because the bread is bloody on the inside). (*C 4.2.14; 17.41.7)
6. Alexander dreams that Heracles invited him into Tyre. Aristander interprets this to mean that the city will be captured, but with Herculean effort. (*A 2.18.1, C 4.2.17)
7. Alexander, besieging Tyre, dreams about a mocking satyr. In Artemidorus Aristander and in P “seers” play with words (“sa tyros”="tyre is thine") to decide that Alexander will take the city. In Ps-Calisthenes the Satyr also gives him a cheese (“tyros”) to trample. (Artemidorus, Interpretation of Dreams 4.23–24; P 24.3–5; Alexander Romance 1.35; Artemidorus incident unnoticed by Jacoby)
8. Aristander, examining entrails, declares that Tyre will be taken that month, even though it is the last day. Alexander decrees a two-day change in the calendar, but then takes the city the same day. (*P 25.1–2)
9. During the siege of Gaza, a bird drops something on Alexander and is caught. Aristander predicts personal danger for Alexander that day, and is proven right. (*A 2.26.4–27.2; *C 4.6.10–13; *P 25.3–4; I 46–7)
10. Foundation of Alexandria. Alexander outlines city with barley meal. In P, S, I and Frag. Sab. birds descend upon it. Aristander projects a prosperous future. (*A 3.1.5–3.2.2; C 4.8.6; P 26.5–6; S 17.1.6; I 49; FGrH 151=Frag. Sab. 11; others)
11. Eclipse occurs twelve days before the Battle of Gaugamela. Aristander (in A) or “Egyptian soothsayers” (in C) interpret the omen favorably. (*A 3.7.6; C 4.10.2–7; see P 31.4)
12. Alexander conducts sacrifices with Aristander the night before the Battle of Gaugamela. (*C 4.13.14–16; *P 31.4; FGrH 148 = Pap. Oxyrch. 1798)
13. Aristander seen among Alexander's soldiers at Gaugamela. Points out an eagle directly above Alexander's head. (*C 4.15.26–27; *P 33.1–2)
14. Aristander sacrifices before crossing the Tanais. He reports the omens are unfavorable. He is subsequently asked to sacrifice again and (in A) proclaims another unfavorable omen or (in C) changes his mind. C relates at length how Alexander rebukes Aristander for failing to report the first forecast directly to the king. (*A 4.4.3; 4.4.9, *C 7.7.8–9; 7.722–29, I 85)
15. Cleitus interrupts a sacrifice to sample some fruit, but the sheep follow him. Alexander orders Aristander and “Cleomantis the Spartan” to interpret the event. Both interpret the event pessimistically. (*P 50.2–4)
16. Alexander, having killed Cleitus, is consoled by Aristander, who “reminds” him of his prophecy (number 14). Alexander is cheered. (*P 52.1; see A 4.9.5)
17. Petroleum is discovered. Aristander predicts that the oil portends success after toil. (*A 4.15.7–8, C 7.10.4; P 57.3; S 9.7.3; Athen. 42 f.; I 97)
18. Lysimachus blunders into the back of Alexander's spear. Alexander staunches the wound with his diadem. The bloody diadem impels Aristander to predict a troubled reign for Lysimachus. J has the event take place in India. (*Appian, Syriaca 64; J 15.3.11–14)
19. Aristander scolds Macedonians for not dealing with Alexander's body, and predicts a bright future for the city that holds it. (*Aelian, Varia Historia 12.64)

== Aristander's writings ==
Writings by Aristander are attested by: Pliny the Elder (Natural History 17); Artemidorus (Interpretation of Dreams 1.31, 4.23-24); Origen (Contra Celsum 6.8.10); see Lucian (citation missing). It is possible that Aristander's writings were, instead, a product of an Aristandrian "school." Aristander's home town, Telmessus in Caria (modern Fethiye), was a proverbial font of seers. There may be some connection between the two items of "Successor Propaganda" (18–19, favoring Lysimachus and Ptolemy) and the rule of Ptolemy I Epigone as dynast in Telmessos. Ptolemy as the son of Lysimachus inherited his father's claims, but eventually made peace with Ptolemy III Euergetes and the Ptolemaic dynasty.

== Sources ==
- Berve, Helmut. Das Alexanderreich auf prosopographischer Grundlage. Two volumes. C. H. Beck, München 1926, no. 117.
- Gattinoni, F. L. "L'indovino Aristandro e l'eredità dei Telmessii", in M. Sordi (ed.), La profezia nel mondo antico (Milan 1993), pp. 123-38. ISBN 88-343-0355-5.
- Grunewalt, William Steven. "A Macedonian Mantis", AncW 5 (1982).
- Heckel, Waldemar. Who's Who in the Age of Alexander the Great: Prosopography of Alexander's Empire. Blackwell Publishing, 2006. ISBN 1-4051-1210-7
- King, Carole J. Alexander and Divination: Dreams, Omens, and Aristander of Telmessus in the Alexander Historians. Unpublished Ph.D. thesis, Brown University, 2004.
- Nice, Alex. "The reputation of the mantis Aristander", Acta Classica 48 (2005) (in honorem Prof. J.E.A. Atkinson).
- Plezia, M. "De Aristandri vaticinio", Eos 59 (1971) 227-30.
- Robinson, C. A. "The Seer Aristander", AJP 50 (1929).
- Spalding, Tim. "Aristander the Prophet and the Alexander Historians" (Presentation at the 1997 meeting of the Classical Association of the Middle West and South).
