= Agathon of Macedon =

Agathon of Macedonia may refer to:

- Agathon (son of Philotas)
- Agathon (son of Tyrimmas)
