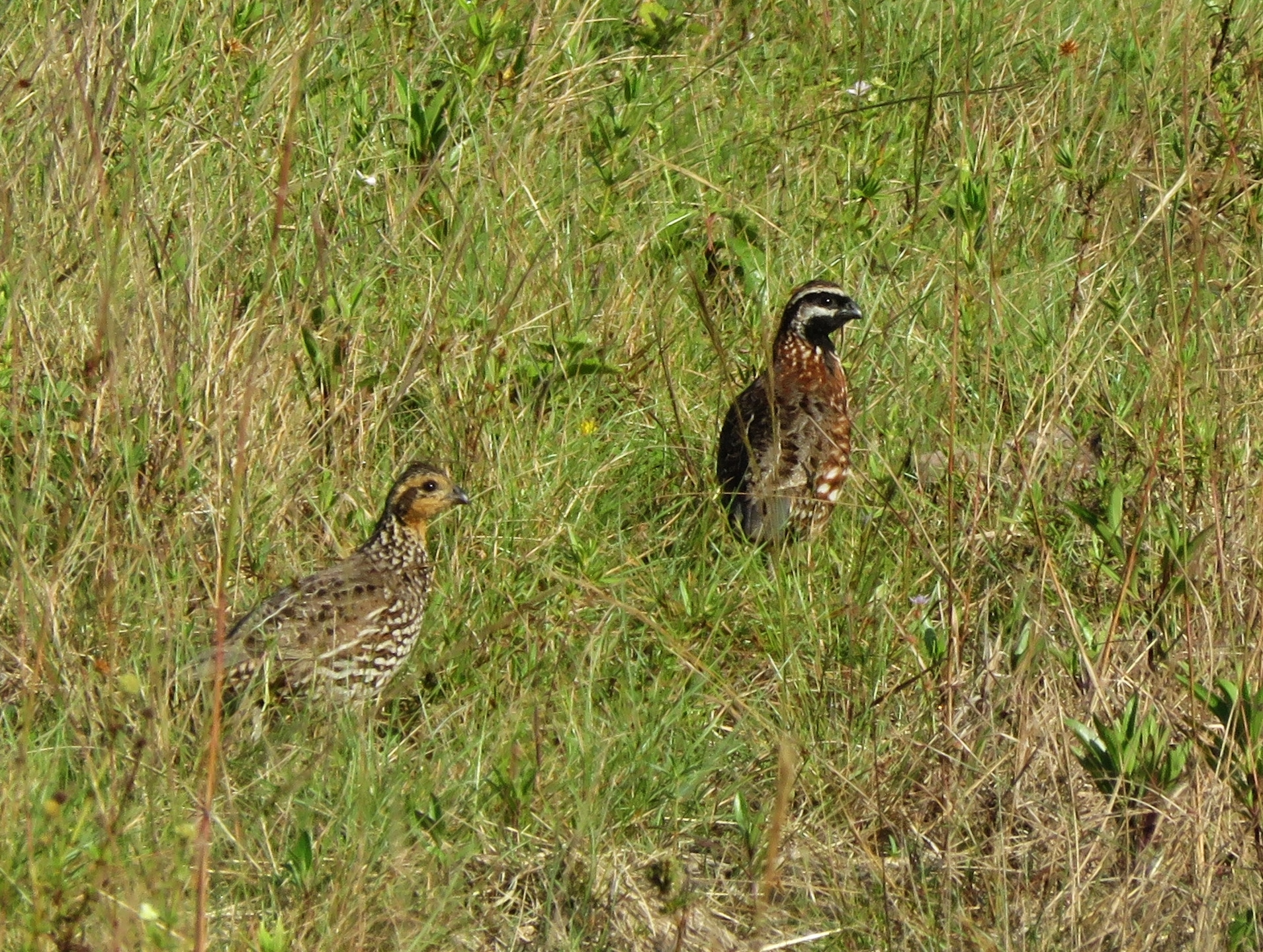

Conservation status
- Least Concern (IUCN 3.1)

Scientific classification
- Kingdom: Animalia
- Phylum: Chordata
- Class: Aves
- Order: Galliformes
- Family: Odontophoridae
- Genus: Colinus
- Species: C. nigrogularis

Binomial name
- Colinus nigrogularis (Gould, 1843)

= Yucatan bobwhite =

Species of bird

The Yucatan bobwhite or black-throated bobwhite (Colinus nigrogularis) is a species of bird in the family Odontophoridae. It is found in Belize, Guatemala, Honduras, Mexico, and Nicaragua. Its natural habitats are subtropical or tropical dry shrubland, subtropical or tropical seasonally wet or flooded lowland grassland, coastal mangroves and heavily degraded former forest. A specific example of occurrence is the Petenes mangroves of the Yucatan.

== Description ==
The male and female Yucatan bobwhite differ in appearance. They are compact, ground-dwelling birds about 20 centimetres (8 in) in length. The male has a black throat edged with white, a white forehead, a black eyestripe and a black crown. The upper neck, mantle and flanks are reddish-brown liberally speckled with white. The rest of the upper parts are brownish, barred withreddish-brown and grey. The underparts have a scalloped appearance as the white feathers are edged with black. The lower belly and under-tail coverts are cinnamon. The female is similar in appearance but the hind neck and mantle are black with paler speckling, the throat is buff and the breast and belly are white barred with reddish-brown and black.

== Distribution and habitat ==
The Yucatan bobwhite is native to Central America where its range extends from the Yucatan Peninsula southwards to Honduras and Nicaragua. Its typical habitat is clearings in forests, pine savannah, rough grassland, weedy fields and plantations of henequen (Agave fourcroydes).

== Status ==
The Yucatan bobwhite has an extensive range and is relatively common. The population size is believed to be stable and the International Union for Conservation of Nature has assessed its conservation status as being of "least concern".

== Subspecies ==
- C. n. caboti van Tyne & Trautman 1941 (Yucatan black-throated bobwhite)
- C. n. persiccus van Tyne & Trautman 1941 (Progreso black-throated bobwhite)
- C. n. nigrogularis (Gould 1843) (Honduras black-throated bobwhite)
- C. n. segoviensis Ridgway 1888 (Segovia black-throated bobwhite)
