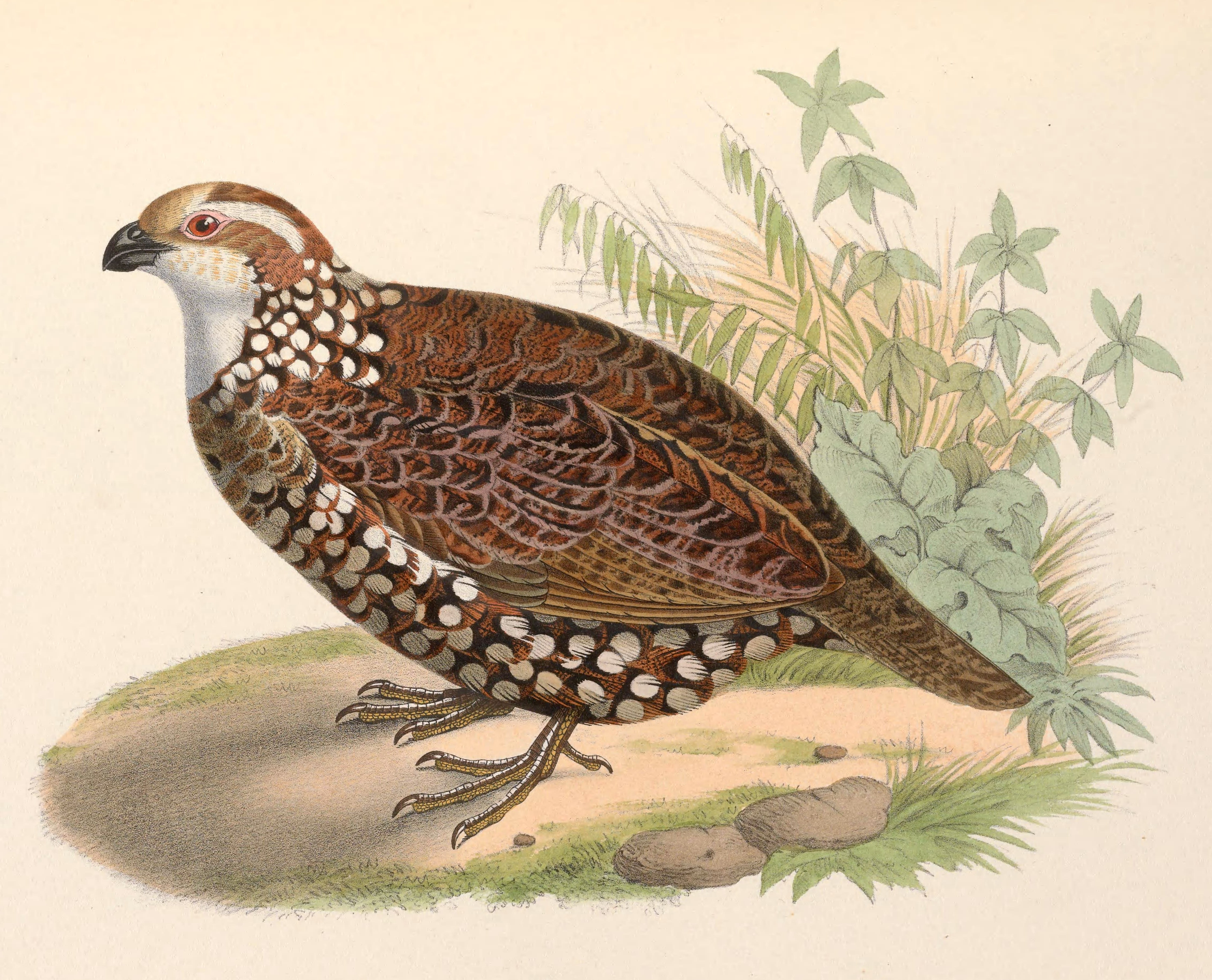

Conservation status
- Least Concern (IUCN 3.1)

Scientific classification
- Kingdom: Animalia
- Phylum: Chordata
- Class: Aves
- Order: Galliformes
- Family: Odontophoridae
- Genus: Colinus
- Species: C. leucopogon

Binomial name
- Colinus leucopogon (Lesson, 1842)

= Spot-bellied bobwhite =

Species of bird

The spot-bellied bobwhite (Colinus leucopogon) is a ground-dwelling bird in the New World quail family. It is sometimes considered to be conspecific with the crested bobwhite, Colinus cristatus. As the latter species expands north into Costa Rica, it is likely that the two species will overlap in range in the future, but the Costa Rican subspecies of the spot-bellied is the least similar to the crested.

The spot-bellied bobwhite is found in El Salvador, Guatemala, Honduras, Nicaragua and Costa Rica in open savanna with bushes and trees and other open woodland.

== Description ==
This species is 22–24 cm long and shows geographically variable male plumage amongst its six subspecies. All forms have a brown back with black spotting on the nape. The head has a white supercilium, a dark line through the eye, a white or brown throat and a short crest. The lower belly is spotted but the rest of the underparts are pale, entirely spotted, or spotted with a rufous chest depending on the subspecies. The male weighs 140 g on average. The female is duller than the male with a buff supercilium and mottled throat; her average weight is 115 g.

The song, most often given by males in spring and summer, is a rising, scratchy, bob-Wight! or bob-bob-White!.

== Taxonomy ==
There are six recognized subspecies.

The subspecies in northwestern Honduras is known as Colinus leucopogon leylandi (Moore, 1859). The holotype specimen of "Ortyx leylandi" Moore (Proc. Zool. Soc. London, 1859, p.62.) is held in the collections of National Museums Liverpool at World Museum, with accession number 1989.66.19. The specimen was collected from "Flores, on the road from Omoa to Comayagua", Honduras, and purchased for the museum from Mr. Leyland on 9 November 1857.

== Behaviour ==
The spot-bellied bobwhite forms "coveys", groups of three to 15 birds during the non-breeding season. Both males and females incubate nests, with most nests predominantly incubated by females. About 10 white eggs are laid. The chicks are precocial and will leave the nest few hours after hatching.

This shy species feeds on seeds and insects, the latter especially during the breeding season. It is most active in the early morning and evening.

== Subspecies ==
- C. l. incanus Friedmann 1944 (Guatemalan white-breasted bobwhite)
- C. l. hypoleucus (Gould 1860) (El Salvador white-breasted bobwhite)
- C. l. leucopogon (Lesson 1842) (white-throated bobwhite)
- C. l. leylandi (Moore 1859) (Leyland's spot-bellied bobwhite)
- C. l. sclateri (Bonaparte 1856) (Sclater's spot-bellied bobwhite)
- C. l. dickeyi Conover 1932 (Dickey's spot-bellied bobwhite)
