= Niphates (Persian general) =

4th-century BC Persian military general

Niphates (Greek: Νιφάτης) was one of the Persian generals in the Battle of the Granicus in 334 BC in Asia Minor (modern-day Turkey). He was stationed on the Persian right during the battle formation, along with Rheomithres and Petenes, and faced the Thessalians, which according to Arrian did heavy damage to the Persians. The scarcity of the details regarding his participation is attributed to the focus of the available sources on Alexander the Great, who fought the Lydians, Rhoesaces and Spithridates in the center. An earlier timeline, put him in a council with other Persian generals and the Persian cavalry near the city of Zeleia. Niphates was killed during the battle at Granicus.

== Sources ==
- Smith, William (1878). A New Classical Dictionary of Greek and Roman Biography Mythology and Geography Partly Based Upon the Dictionary of Greek and Roman Biography and Mythology. Harper.
- Heckel, Waldemar (2006). Who's Who in the Age of Alexander the Great: Prosopography of Alexander's Empire. Blackwell Publishing.
