= Ptolemy (son of Philip) =

4th-century BC Macedonian military general

Ptolemy, son of Philip (Greek: Πτολεμαῖος ὁ Φιλίππου) was an officer who commanded the leading squadron of Macedonian cavalry (that of Socrates) at the Battle of the Granicus. Both Gronovius and Droysen, suppose that he is the same man that Alexander left with a force of 3,000 infantry and 200 cavalry to defend the province of Caria, and who subsequently, together with Asander the governor of Lydia, defeated the Persian general Orontobates, 332 BC.
