= Philip (son of Menelaus) =

4th-century BC Macedonian general

Philip (Ancient Greek: Φίλιππος), son of Menelaus was a Macedonian general of Alexander from the beginning of the Asiatic expedition. In the battle of Granicus (334 BC) he commanded the allied cavalry from Peloponnesus. In the battle of Gaugamela (331 BC) the Thessalian cavalry.
