= Omares =

4th-century BC Persian military commander

Omares (Greek: Ὠμάρης) was a Persian, commander of 20,000 Greek mercenaries in the battle of the Granicus (modern-day Turkey). He was killed during the battle.
