= Proteas of Macedon =

Proteas (Greek: Πρωτέας), son of Andronicus of Olynthus and Lanike, was a syntrophos and hetairos of Alexander the Great. Antipater sent him with fifteen ships to protect the Greek islands and mainland against Persian attack. Putting in at Chalcis on Euboea, he advanced to Cythnus, and then caught the Persian admiral Datames at Siphnos at dawn, capturing eight of his ten ships. Proteas came with a penteconter from Macedon to join Alexander at Sidon. Like Hegelochus, who served with the fleet, Proteas soon joined Alexander's expedition, and accompanied him by land from at least Egypt. He was a notorious drinking companion of Alexander.
