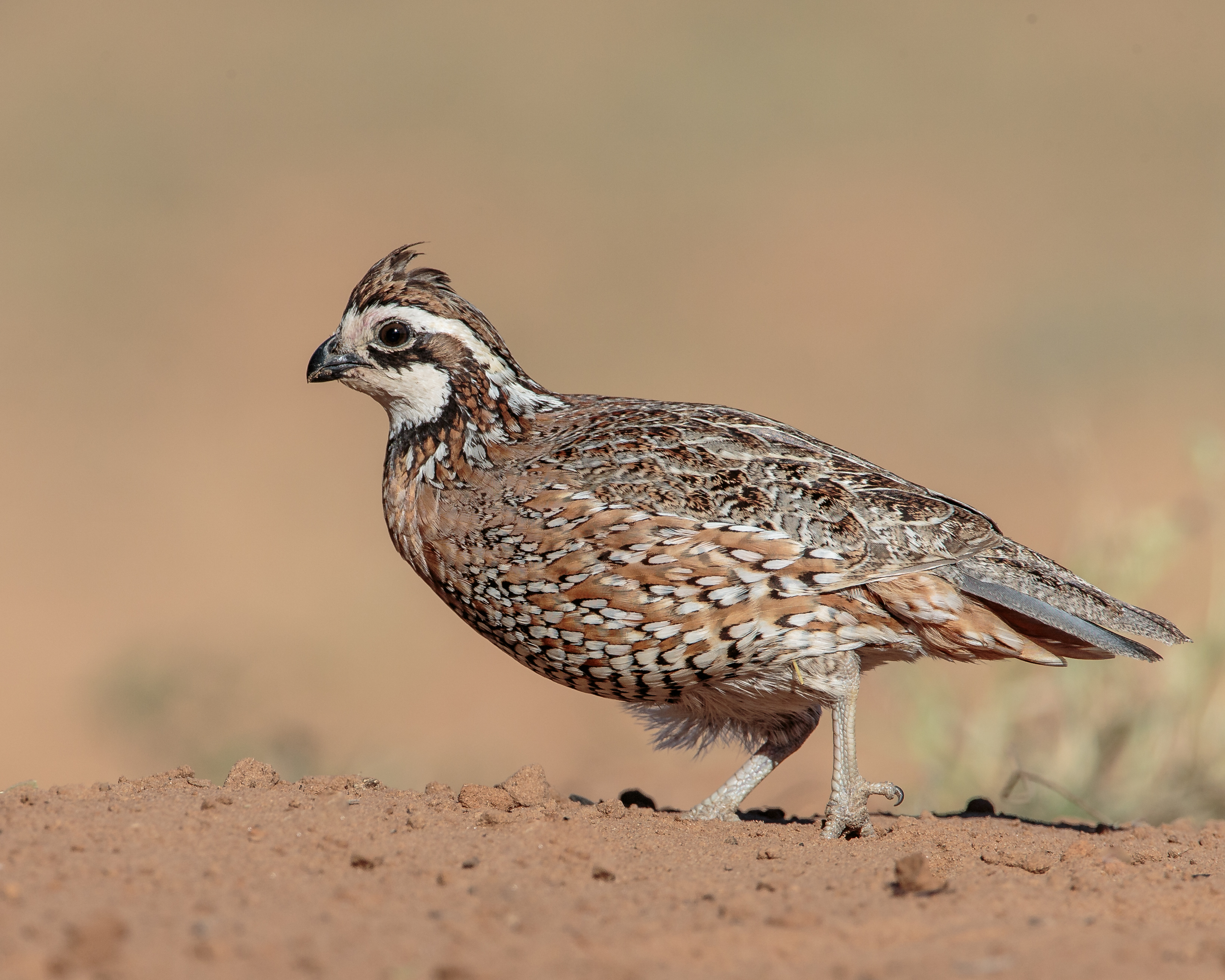
- Colinus virginianus

Scientific classification
- Kingdom: Animalia
- Phylum: Chordata
- Class: Aves
- Order: Galliformes
- Family: Odontophoridae
- Genus: Colinus; Goldfuss, 1820

Type species
- Perdrix mexicanus=Tetrao virginianus Linnaeus, 1758 northern bobwhite

Species
- Colinus cristatus; Colinus leucopogon; Colinus nigrogularis; Colinus virginianus

= Colinus =

Bobwhite

Genus of birds

Colinus is a genus of birds in the New World quail family, Odontophoridae. Members of the genus are commonly known as bobwhites.

== Taxonomy ==
The genus Colinus was introduced in 1820 by the German naturalist Georg August Goldfuss to accommodate a single species, Perdrix mexicanus, a junior synonym of Tetrao virginianus Linnaeus, 1758, the northern bobwhite, which is the type species by monotypy. The genus name come from the Nahuatl language Zōlin meaning "quail".

== Species ==
The genus contains four species.

Genus Colinus – Goldfuss, 1820 – four species
Common name	Scientific name and subspecies	Range	Size and ecology	IUCN status and estimated population
Crested bobwhite	Colinus cristatus (Linnaeus, 1766)	Map of range	Size: 22 cm Habitat: open scrubland Diet:	LC
Spot-bellied bobwhite	Colinus leucopogon (Lesson, 1842)	El Salvador, Guatemala, Honduras, Nicaragua and Costa Rica	Size: 23 cm Habitat: open scrubland Diet:	LC
Yucatan bobwhite, black-throated bobwhite	Colinus nigrogularis (Gould, 1843)	Map of range	Size: 22 cm Habitat: henequen and sisal landscape Diet:	LC
Northern bobwhite	Colinus virginianus (Linnaeus, 1758)	Map of range	Size: 25 cm Habitat: prairies, farmland, woodlands Diet:	NT

=== Fossil species ===
- †Colinus eatoni Shufeldt 1915
- †Colinus suilium Brodkorb 1959
- †Colinus hibbardi Wetmore 1944
