= Pandarus =

Lycian Archer

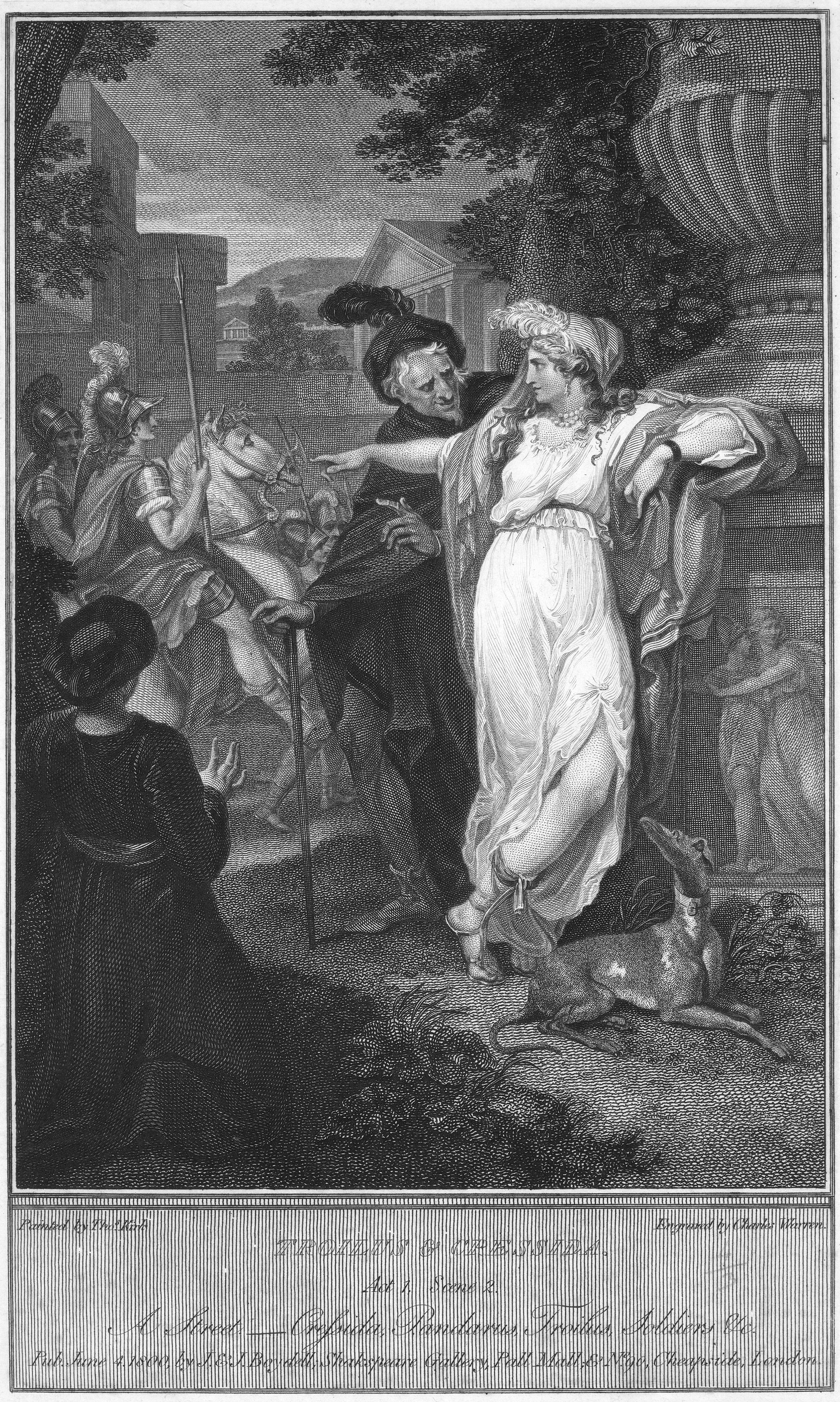
Pandarus, centre, with Cressida, illustration to Troilus and Cressida by Thomas Kirk.

Pandarus /ˈpændərəs/ or Pandar /ˈpændər/ (Ancient Greek: Πάνδαρος Pándaros), son of Lycaon, is a skilled Lycian archer who lived in the Troad city of Zeleia. In the Iliad, he is allied with Troy and appears in stories about the Trojan War. He is infamous for breaking the truce between the Trojans and the Achaeans in Homer's Iliad, Book 4.

In Homer's Iliad, Book 4, he is portrayed as a skilled archer, but in medieval literature he becomes a witty and licentious figure who facilitates the affair between Troilus and Cressida.

In Shakespeare's play Troilus and Cressida, he is portrayed as an aged degenerate and coward who ends the play by telling the audience he will bequeath them his "diseases".

== Classical literature ==
In Homer's Iliad, Pandarus is a renowned archer and the son of Lycaon. Pandarus, who fought on the side of Troy in the Trojan War and led a contingent from Zeleia, first appeared in Book Two of the Iliad. In Book Four, he is tricked by Athena, who wishes for the destruction of Troy and assumes the form of Laodocus, son of Antenor, to shoot and wound Menelaus with an arrow, sabotaging a truce that could potentially have led to the peaceful return of Helen of Troy. He then attempts to kill Diomedes at close range, since Athena is protecting him from his deadly arrows, while Aeneas acts as his charioteer. Diomedes narrowly survives the attack, though, retaliating with a deadly blow that knocks Pandarus out of the chariot. Diomedes then pursues Aeneas, who is saved by his mother Aphrodite.

In the Aeneid, he has a brother called Eurytion who is also a skilled archer. A different Pandarus accompanies Aeneas to Italy. His skull is cut in half by Turnus' sword, ending his life and causing a panic among the other Trojans.

== Later literature ==
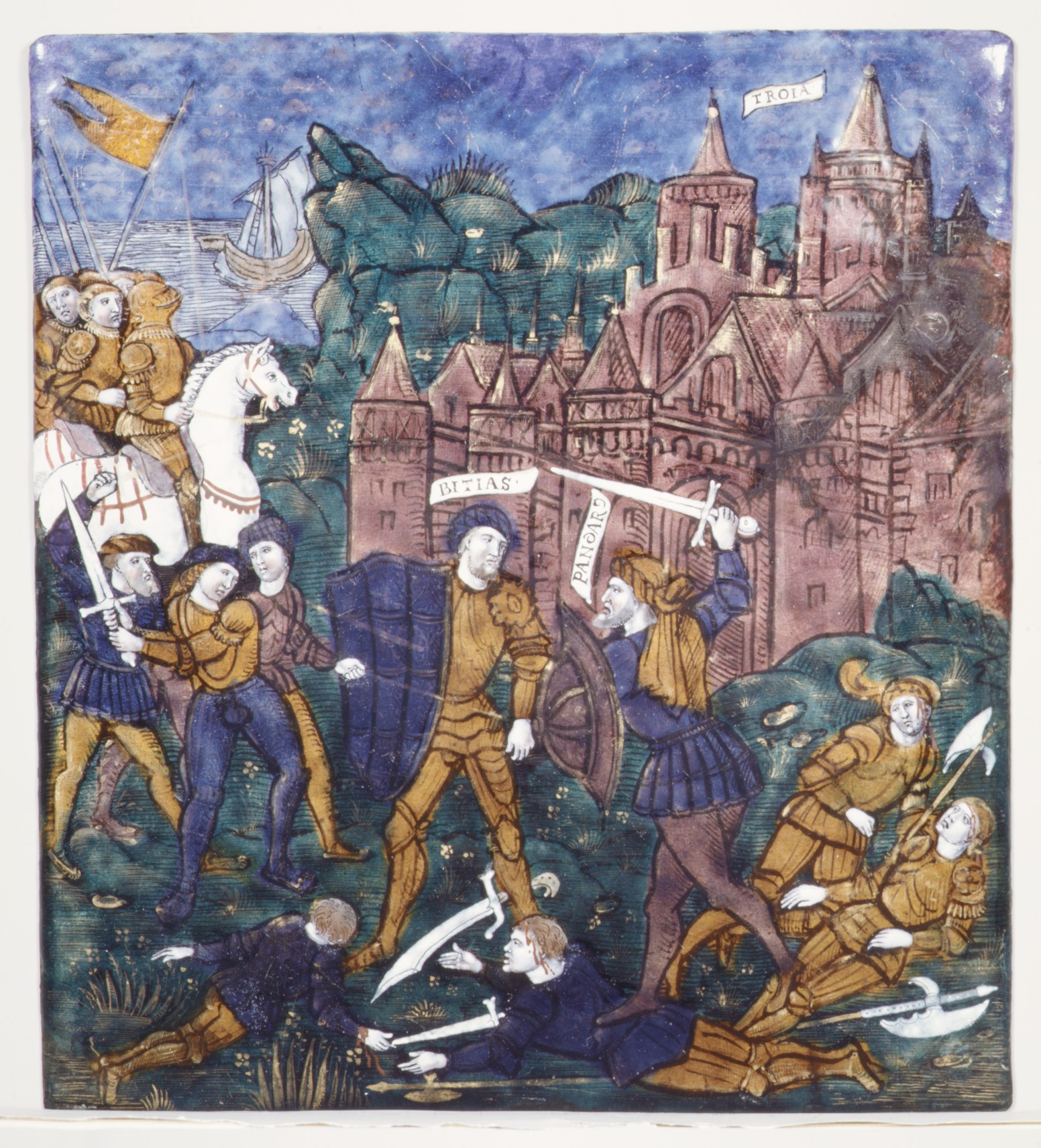
Pandarus and Bitias Fight the Rutuli Before the Trojan Camp (Aeneid, Book IX)

Pandarus appears in Il Filostrato by Giovanni Boccaccio, in which he plays the role of a go-between in the relationship of his cousin Criseyde and the Trojan prince Troilus, the younger brother of Paris and Hector. Boccaccio himself derived the story from Le Roman De Troie, by 12th-century poet Benoît de Sainte-Maure. This story is not part of classical Greek mythology. Both Pandarus and other characters in the medieval narrative who carry names from the Iliad are quite different from Homer's characters of the same name.

In Geoffrey Chaucer’s poem Troilus and Criseyde (1370), Pandarus plays the same role, though Chaucer's Pandarus is Criseyde's uncle, not her cousin. Chaucer's Pandarus is of special interest because he is constructed as an expert rhetorician, who uses dozens of proverbs and proverbial sayings to bring the lovers Troilus and Criseyde together. When his linguistic fireworks fail at the end of the story, the proverb and human rhetoric in general are questioned as reliable means of communication.

William Shakespeare used the medieval story again in his play Troilus and Cressida (1609). Shakespeare's Pandarus is more of a bawd than Chaucer's, as well as being lecherous and degenerate.

In The Duke's Children by Anthony Trollope, when the Duke of Omnium suspects Mrs. Finn of encouraging his daughter's romance, he refers to her as a 'she-Pandarus'.

In "The Sailor Who Fell From Grace With The Sea" by Yukio Mishima, Pandarus is mentioned briefly during an internal contemplation by the character Ryuji Tsukazaki.

== Pandering ==
The plot function of the aging lecher Pandarus in Chaucer's and Shakespeare's famous works has given rise to the English terms a pander (in later usage a panderer), from Chaucer, meaning a person who furthers other people's illicit sexual amours; and to pander, from Shakespeare, as a verb denoting the same activity. A panderer is, specifically, a bawd — a male who arranges access to female sexual favors: the manager of prostitutes. Thus, in law, the charge of pandering is an accusation that an individual has sold the sexual services of another. The verb "to pander" is also used in a more general sense to suggest active or implicit encouragement of someone's weaknesses.
