= Spithridates =

Achaemenid satrap of Lydia and Ionia (died 334 BC)

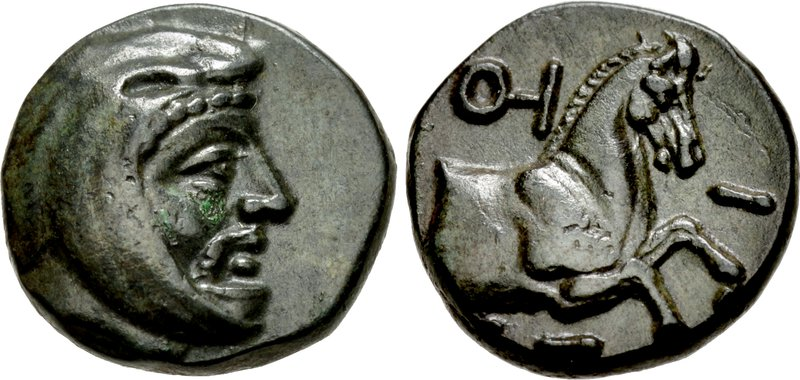
- Coin of Spithridates, Achaemenid Satrap of Sparda (Lydia and Ionia), circa 334 BC

Satrap of Lydia
- In office 365 – 334 BC
- Preceded by: Autophradates
- Succeeded by: position abolished

Personal details
- Died: 334 BC At the Granicus in the Troad region (modern-day Biga River, Turkey)

Military service
- Allegiance: Achaemenid Empire
- Battles/wars: Wars of Alexander the Great; Battle of the Granicus †

Spithridates (Old Persian: *Spiθradātah; Ancient Greek: Σπιθριδάτης, romanized: Spithridátēs; fl. 365–334 BC) was a Persian satrap of Lydia and Ionia under the high king Darius III Codomannus. He was one of the Persian commanders at the Battle of the Granicus, in 334 BC. In this engagement, while he was aiming a blow from behind at Alexander the Great, his arm was cut off by Cleitus the Black and he subsequently died.

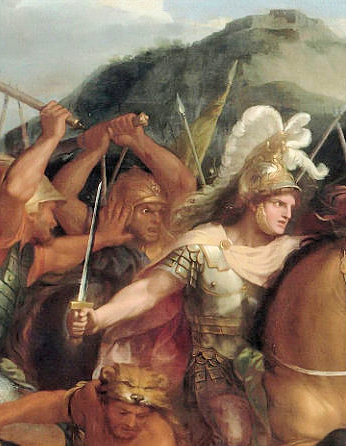
Spithridates attacking Alexander from behind at the Battle of Granicus. Charles le Brun (detail).

Diodorus calls him Spithrobates (Σπιθροβάτης Spithrobátēs), and appears to confound him with Mithridates, the son-in-law of Darius, whom Alexander slew in the battle with his own hand; while what Arrian records of Spithridates, Diodorus accounts it for his brother Rhosaces.

Spithridates was replaced by the Hellenistic satrap Asander in his territories.

== Sources ==
- Smith, William (editor); Dictionary of Greek and Roman Biography and Mythology, "Spithridates (2)", Boston, (1867)
