= Rhosaces =

Persian general (died 334 BC)

Rhosaces (Old Persian: *Raucakah; Ancient Greek: Ῥωσάκης, romanized: Rhōsákēs) was the brother of Spithridates, a satrap of Ionia and Lydia, with whom he might have held the possession of satrap. Rhosaces served in the earlier campaigns of Artaxerxes III in Phoenicia and in Egypt where he was singled out for his 'valour and loyalty' to serve alongside allied Theban troops. He took part in the Battle of the Granicus in 334 BC where he was killed. According to Diodorus of Sicily, after his brother Spithridates was killed by Alexander the Great the fight between Alexander and Rhosaces happened like this:

"The Persian fell, but just at this moment his brother Rhosaces galloped up and brought his sword down on Alexander's head so hard that he split his helmet and wounded his scalp. As Rhosaces aimed another blow at the same break in the helmet, Cleitus, known as "the Black," dashed up and cut off the Persian's arm."

However, Arrian records Spithridates as the one who lost his arm to Cleitus and thus Diodorus seems to confound Rhosaces with his brother Spithridates. According to Arrian, Rhosaces hit Alexander hard on his helmet before Alexander managed to kill him.
