= Lanike =

Nurse of Alexander the Great

- Λανίκη
- Occupation: nurse
- Employer: Philip II of Macedon
- Known for: nurse of Alexander the Great
- Spouse: Andronicus of Olynthus
- Children: Proteas and 2 others
- Relatives: Cleitus the Black (brother)

Lanike or Lanice pronounced (Lan iss) (Greek: Λανίκη), also called Hellanike or Alacrinis, daughter of Dropidas, was the sister of Cleitus the Black, and the nurse of Alexander the Great. She was born, most likely, shortly after 380 BC; for she is named as the mother of Proteas and two other sons who died in the Siege of Miletus in 334 BC. Her husband may have been Andronicus of Olynthus.

== Lanike in fiction ==
She is referenced in Alexander Revisited: The Final Cut by Oliver Stone. Clitus asks Alexander, "Who planned the Asian invasion while you were still being spanked on your bottom by my sister Lanike?" In a rage Alexander proceeds to kill Clitus, but while mourning his actions, Alexander weeps about what he has done to Lanike, i.e. killing her brother. She also appears in numerous dramatic and fictional accounts of Alexander's life, such as the novel Fire From Heaven by Mary Renault.
