= Arsames (satrap of Cilicia) =

Achaemenid Persian satrap of Cilicia in 334/3 BC

Location of Cilicia.

Arsames (Old Persian Aršāma, Greek: Ἀρσάμης) was an Achaemenid Persian satrap of Cilicia in 334/3 BC. He succeeded Mazaeus in this position. He took part in the Battle of Granicus where he fought with his cavalry on the left wing, along with Arsites and Memnon of Rhodes. He was able to survive that battle and flee to the capital of Cilicia Tarsus. There he was planning a scorched-earth policy according to that of Memnon which caused the native Cilician soldiers to abandon their posts. He also decided to burn Tarsus to the ground so as not to fall in the hands of Alexander but was prevented from doing so by the speedy arrival of Parmenion with the light armored units who took the city. After that, Arsames fled to Darius who was at this time in Syria. He was slain at the battle of Issus (modern-day Turkey) in 333 BC.

He was succeeded by Balacrus, a bodyguard of Alexander the Great, who became the Hellenistic satrap of Cilica.

== Sources ==
- Heckel, Waldemar (2006). Who’s Who in the Age of Alexander the Great: Prosopography of Alexander’s Empire. Blackwell Publishing.
