= Pharnaces (Persian noble) =

4th-century BC Persian noble (died 334 BC)

Pharnaces (died 334 BC, Greek: Φαρνάκης) was a Persian noble of the 4th century BC apparently belonging to the Pontic-Cappadocian nobility. His sister was a wife of Darius III. They had a son named Ariobarzanes and a daughter who married Mithridates and thus they were nephews of Pharnaces. He was one of the Persian commanders in the battle of the Granicus in 334 BC in Asia Minor (modern-day Turkey), and was killed during the battle.
