= Atizyes =

Persian satrap of Greater Phrygia (died 333 BC)

Atizyes (Ancient Greek: Ἀτιζύης; died 333 BC) was a Persian satrap of Greater Phrygia under the Achaemenids in 334 BC, when Alexander the Great began his campaign. He is not mentioned in the council of Zelea where the satrap coalition was formed against the invasion, so it is not sure whether he took part in the battle of the Granicus. After the battle, he appears to be in the capital of Greater Phrygia, Celaenae where he had a garrison force of 1,000 Carians and 100 Greek mercenaries. He himself went to Syria to join the army of Darius III and fell in the battle of Issus (modern-day Turkey) at 333 BC. After Phrygia fell to Alexander, he appointed his general Antigonus Monophthalmus as its satrap.

== Sources ==
- Heckel, Waldemar (2006). Who's Who in the Age of Alexander the Great: Prosopography of Alexander's Empire. Blackwell Publishing.
