= Andronicus of Olynthus =

4th-century Macedonian nobleman and general

Andronicus (Greek: Ἀνδρόνικος) of Olynthus was a Macedonian nobleman and general in the 4th century BCE.

This Andronicus is probably the same as the son of Agerrhus mentioned by Arrian and Diodorus Siculus: that is, the same Andronicus who accompanied Alexander the Great on his expedition in Asia, and was the father of Proteas of Macedon and husband to Lanike. If this is indeed the same Andronicus, he would also be the father of two sons, whose names are lost to us now, who died at Miletus in 334. This conflation is unclear, however, and this Andronicus may have been distinct from another Andronicus of Macedon.

In 330, Andronicus was sent by Alexander to take command of 1500 Greek mercenaries who had served under Darius III before the latter's death; he was accompanied by former Darius loyalist Artabazos II of Phrygia. Andronicus was then sent against the rebellious Persian satrap Satibarzanes, along with Artabazos, Caranus, and Erigyius.

Andronicus was one of the four generals appointed by Antigonus I Monophthalmus to form the military council of Antigonus' son, the young Demetrius I of Macedon, in 314. He commanded the right wing of the army of Demetrius at the Battle of Gaza in 312, and after the loss of the battle, and the subsequent retreat of Demetrius, was left in command of the city of Tyre. He refused to surrender the city to Ptolemy I Soter, and in response to Ptolemy's requests sent Ptolemy insulting and contemptuous messages. Andronicus later lost the city due to a popular insurrection of its inhabitants as the city's provisions ran low during the long siege. Ptolemy captured Andronicus, but spared his life, treating him as a friend, despite Andronicus having treated him with such insolence, turning the general from a stubborn enemy into a partisan. He may have ended his career as one of Ptolemy's philoi (that is, a trusted friend and advisor).
