= Arsites =

4th-century BC Persian satrap of Hellespontine Phrygia

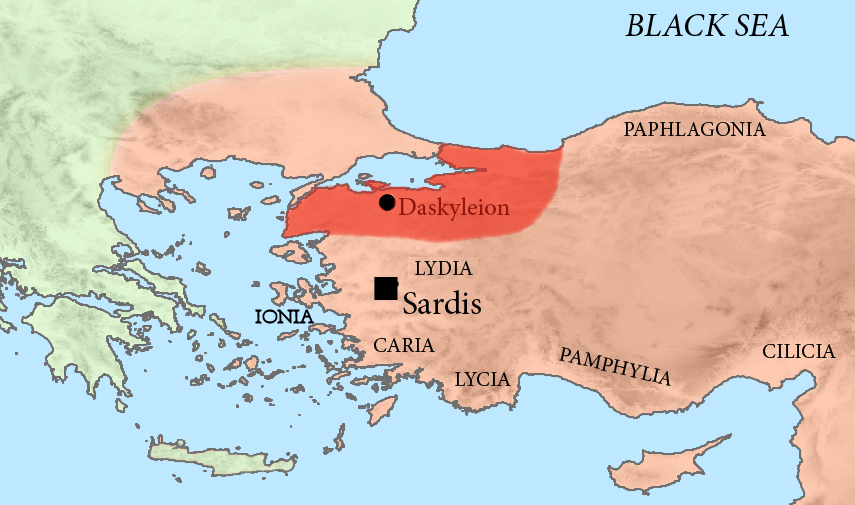
Location of Hellespontine Phrygia, and the provincial capital of Dascylium, in the Achaemenid Empire, c. 500 BC.

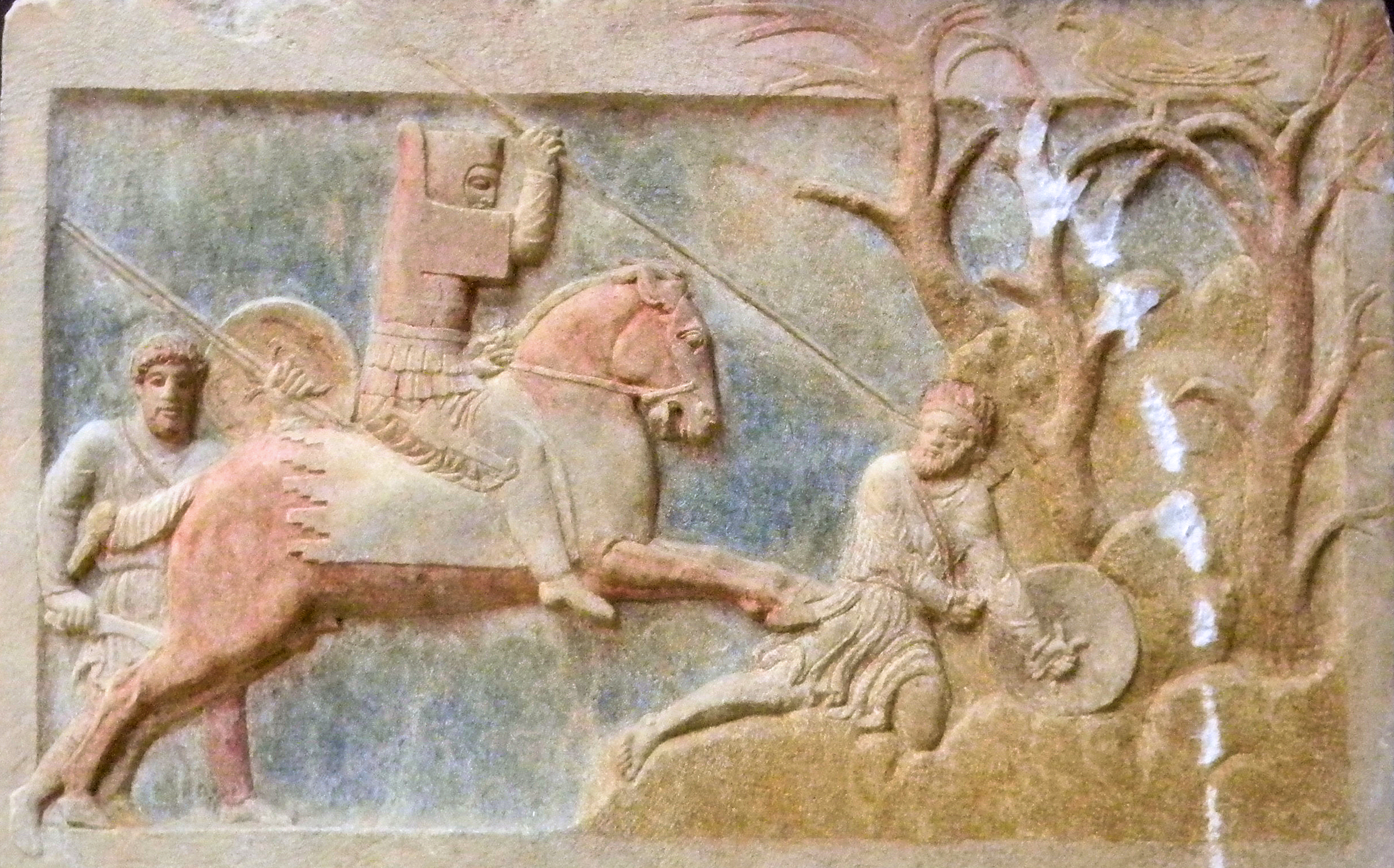
Achaemenid Dynast of Hellespontine Phrygia attacking a Greek psiloi, Altıkulaç Sarcophagus, early 4th century BCE.

Arsites (Old Persian: *R̥šitaʰ; Ancient Greek: Ἀρσίτης Arsítēs; Persian: آرستیس) was Persian satrap of Hellespontine Phrygia in the Achaemenid Empire in the 4th century BC. His satrapy also included the region of Paphlagonia.

In 340 BC, he sent a mercenary force under the leadership of the Athenian Apollodorus to defend Perinthos, which was besieged by Philip II of Macedon, possibly at Artaxerxes III's request. The operation was successful and prevented a further advance of Philip into Asia Minor.

In the spring of 334 BC, however, Alexander the Great, after crossing the Hellespont, set foot in Asia Minor in the dominion of Arsites. Arsites then took part in the satrap coalition to counter the attacker. In the consequent war-council of Zelea he was foremost in opposing the scorched earth plan presented by the mercenary Memnon. In the battle of the Granicus, he commanded the Paphlagonian cavalry in the left Persian wing just to the right of Arsames and Memnon of Rhodes.

Arsites fled from the battlefield at Granicus, but shortly afterwards committed suicide feeling that the blame for the defeat should fall on him. His province was the first on Asian soil to fall into the hands of Alexander. Alexander then appointed one of his generals, Calas, as the new satrap of the province.

Arsites had a son named Mithropastes who fled to an island in the Persian Gulf after his father's death. In 325/4 BC he was taken from the island by the naval commander Nearchos, whom he accompanied on the rest of his voyage.

== Sources ==
- Smith, William (1878). A New Classical Dictionary of Greek and Roman Biography Mythology and Geography Partly Based Upon the Dictionary of Greek and Roman Biography and Mythology. Harper.
- Heckel, Waldemar (2006). Who's Who in the Age of Alexander the Great: Prosopography of Alexander's Empire. Blackwell Publishing.
- Cartledge, P. (2004). Alexander the Great. Vintage Books. p. 300.
