= Petenes =

4th-century BC Persian military general

Petenes (Greek: Πετήνης) was one of the Persian generals in the Battle of the Granicus in 334 BC in Asia Minor (modern-day Turkey). He was killed during the cavalry engagement.

== Sources ==
- Smith, William (1878). A New Classical Dictionary of Greek and Roman Biography Mythology and Geography Partly Based Upon the Dictionary of Greek and Roman Biography and Mythology. Harper.
- Heckel, Waldemar (2006). Who’s Who in the Age of Alexander the Great: Prosopography of Alexander’s Empire. Blackwell Publishing.
