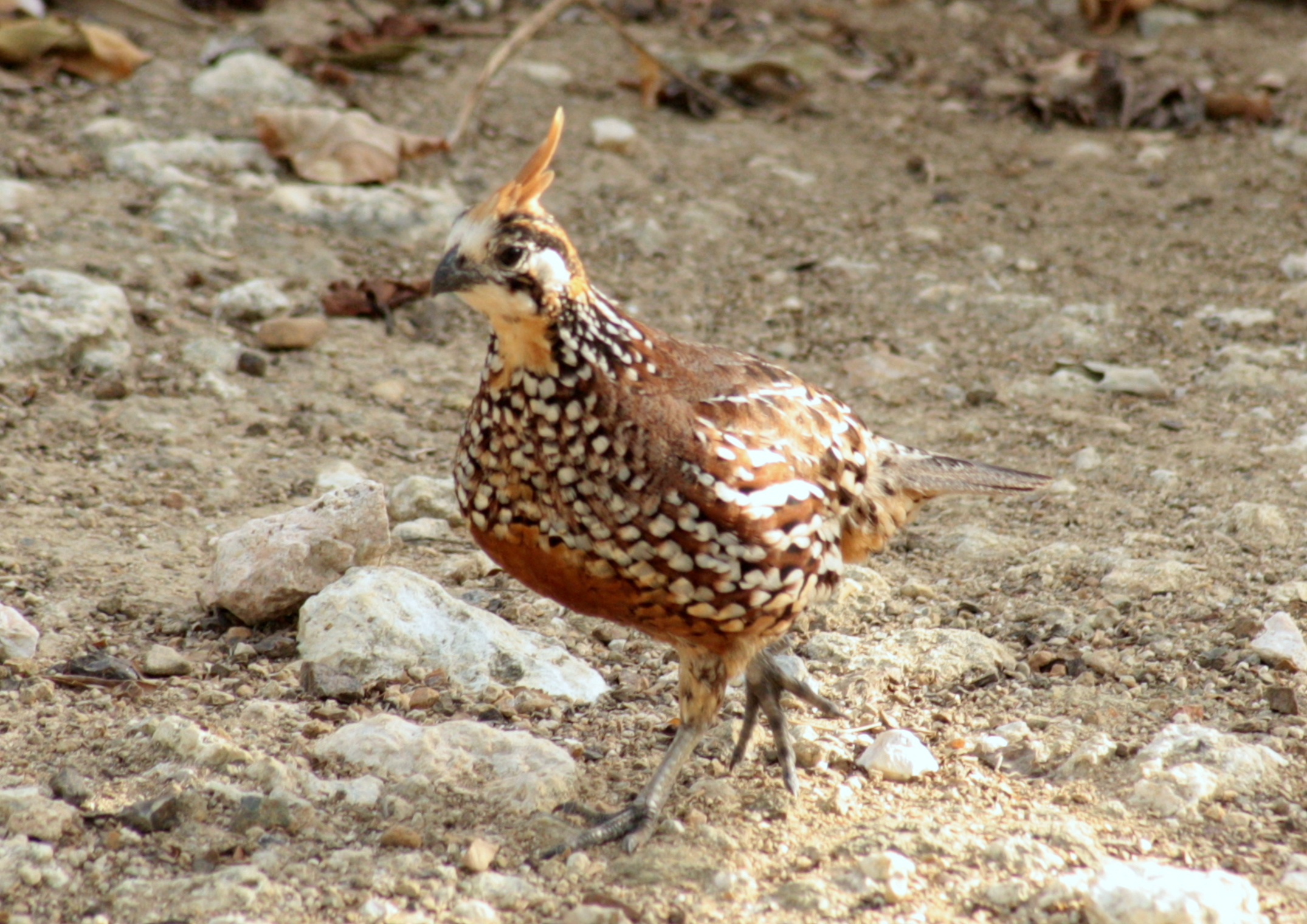
- On Curaçao, Netherlands Antilles

Conservation status
- Least Concern (IUCN 3.1)

Scientific classification
- Kingdom: Animalia
- Phylum: Chordata
- Class: Aves
- Order: Galliformes
- Family: Odontophoridae
- Genus: Colinus
- Species: C. cristatus

Binomial name
- Colinus cristatus (Linnaeus, 1766)

Synonyms
- Tetrao cristatus Linnaeus, 1766

= Crested bobwhite =

Species of bird

The crested bobwhite (Colinus cristatus) is a species of bird in the family Odontophoridae. It is found in northern South America, extending through Panama to just reach Costa Rica. It also occurs on Aruba and the Netherlands Antilles. Its natural habitats are subtropical or tropical dry shrubland, subtropical or tropical seasonally wet or flooded lowland grassland, and heavily degraded former forest.

== Description ==
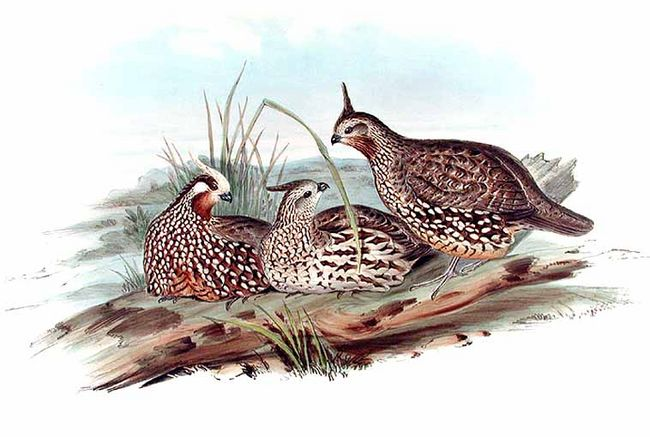
Painting

Adult crested bobwhite are about 178 to 216 millimetres (7.0 to 8.5 in) long. The sexes are very similar in appearance. The long feathers on the fore-head and crown are pale buff or white, and the crest feathers may be dark. The back and sides of the neck are marbled in black and white and the throat is white or buff, sometimes spotted with black. The upper parts are mottled black, brown and grey. The underparts are pale, with buff, cinnamon and black markings. The eye is brown, the beak black and the legs bluish-grey. The female is slightly browner than the male.

== Behaviour ==
The crested bobwhite occurs in small groups on the ground in or near thick cover and its behaviour is rather similar to that of the northern bobwhite (Colinus virginianus). The diet consists of buds, shoots, leaves and small invertebrates. The male's call, heard in the breeding season, is distinctive; a fast, husky, three-syllable "quoit bob-white" or a two-syllable "oh, wheet".

== Status ==
The crested bobwhite has a very wide range and is common in much of that range. The population seems to be on the increase and the International Union for Conservation of Nature has assessed its conservation status as being of "least concern".

== Subspecies ==
- C. c. mariae Wetmore 1962 (Tres Marias crested bobwhite)
- C. c. panamensis Dickey & van Rossem 1930 (Panamanian crested quail)
- C. c. decoratus (Todd 1917) (Magdalena crested bobwhite)
- C. c. littoralis (Todd 1917) (littoral crested bobwhite)
- C. c. cristatus (Linnaeus, 1766)
- C. c. horvathi (Madarász 1904) (Horvath's crested bobwhite)
- C. c. barnesi Gilliard 1940 (Barnes' crested bobwhite)
- C. c. sonnini (Temminck 1815) (Sonnini's crested bobwhite)
- C. c. mocquerysi (Hartert 1894) (Mocquerys's/Cumana crested bobwhite)
- C. c. leucotis (Gould 1844) (white-eared crested bobwhite)
- C. c. badius Conover 1938 (Cauca Valley crested bobwhite)
- C. c. bogotensis Dugand 1943 (Bogotá crested bobwhite)
- C. c. parvicristatus (Gould 1843) (short-crested bobwhite)
