= Mithridates (Persian general) =

Persian general (died 334 BC)

- Μιθριδάτης or Μιθραδάτης
- Born: Ancient Greece
- Died: d. 334 BC; Turkey
- Cause of death: stabbed with a lance by Alexander the Great

Mithridates or Mithradates (Greek: Μιθριδάτης or Μιθραδάτης) was a Persian noble. His wife was the daughter of Darius III with the sister of Pharnaces, which made him the son-in-law of Darius. He was slain by the hand of Alexander the Great himself, at the Battle of the Granicus (modern-day Turkey) in 334 BC, when Alexander plunged his lance through Mithridates' face.

== Sources ==
- Smith, William (editor); Dictionary of Greek and Roman Biography and Mythology, "Mithridates (5)"^{[usurped]}, Boston, (1867)
