= Socrates of Macedon =

4th-century BC Macedonian cavalry officer

Socrates (Ancient Greek: Σωκράτης), son of Sathon, was hipparch of the ile of Hetairoi from Apollonia, since at least the beginning of the Asiatic expedition. He fought in the Battle of the Granicus.
