= Zeleia =

Ancient city

- Ζέλεια (Ancient Greek)
- Location within Marmara Location within Turkey
- 40°12′13″N 27°35′42″E
- Type: Town
- Location: Balıkesir, Turkey

Zeleia (Ancient Greek: Ζέλεια) and Zele (Ancient Greek: Ζέλη) was a town of the ancient Troad, at the foot of Mount Ida and on the banks of the river Aesepus (both located in Turkey), at a distance of 80 stadia from its mouth. It is mentioned by Homer in the Trojan Battle Order in the Iliad, and later when Homer calls it a holy town. Zeleia led a force of warriors to aid Troy during the Trojan War, led by Pandarus, son of Lycaon (not to be confused with Lycaon, son of Priam). It is later related that the people of Zeleia are "Lycians", though the Zeleians are distinct from the Lycians who come from Lycia in southwestern Asia Minor, led by Sarpedon and Glaucus.

It was named after the hero Zeleios.

Arrian mentions it as the headquarters of the Persian army before the Battle of the Granicus, in May 334 BCE, where the Persian satraps held a council at Zeleia where they discussed how best to confront Alexander the Great. It existed in the time of Strabo; but afterwards it disappears.

Arthmios (Ancient Greek: Ἄρθμιος, Aryan-Luvian meaning truly mine or my perfect one) of Zeleia together with his family, was declared an outlaw in the territory of Athens and her allies, because he had brought the gold from Persian Empire into Peloponnese. Nicagoras (Ancient Greek: Νικαγόρας) of Zeleia, was a tyrant of Zeleia.

The site of ancient Zeleia is located near Sarıköy, Balıkesir, Turkey.

== See also ==
- Ancient sites of Balıkesir
