= Dimitriadis =

Dimitriadis is a Greek surname. It is a patronymic surname which literally means "the son of Dimitris". Notable people with the surname include:

- Odysseas Dimitriadis, (1908–2005), Greek/Soviet classical music conductor
- Vasilis Dimitriadis, (born 1966), Greek footballer
- Vassilis Dimitriadis (skier), (born 1978), Greek alpine skier
- Panajotis Dimitriadis, (born 1986), Swedish footballer
- Anastasios Dimitriadis, (born 1997), Greek footballer
- Georgios Dimitriadis, (born 1981), Cypriot former swimmer
- Stefanos Dimitriadis, (born 1989), Greek swimmer
- Konstantinos Dimitriadis, (born 1879 or 1881–1943), Bulgarian-Greek sculptor
- Ioannis Dimitriadis, (born 1970), Greek footballer
- Petros Dimitriadis, (born 1978), Greek footballer
- Zafiris Dimitriadis, (born 1975), Greek footballer

== See also ==
- Dimitriadis 505
