= Cleitus the Black =

4th-century BC Macedonian cavalry officer

- Κλεῖτος ὁ μέλας
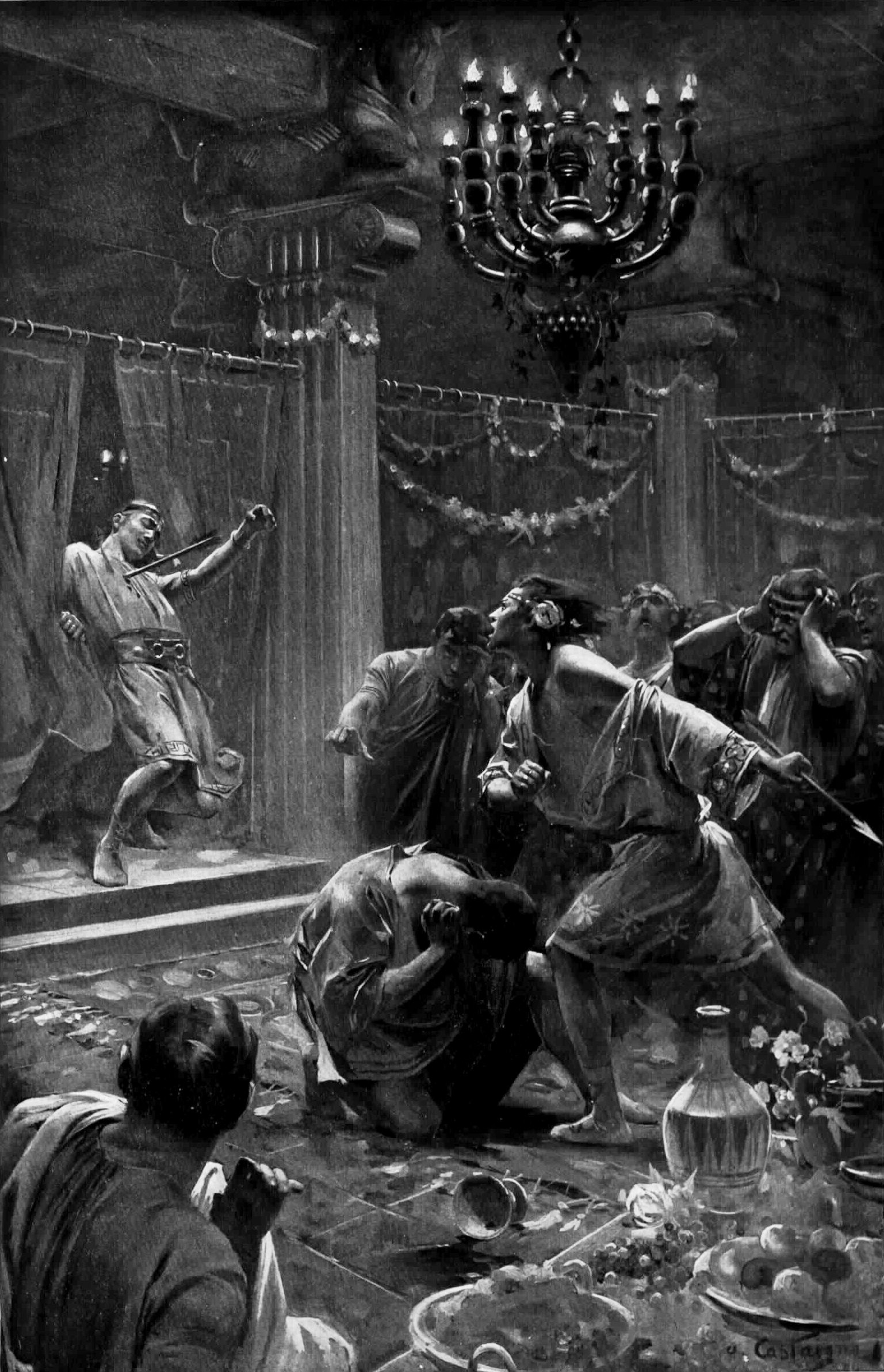
- Alexander kills Cleitus, André Castaigne, c. 1898–1899
- Born: Cleitus; 375 BC
- Died: 328 BC (aged 46–47 years old); Markanda, Bactria
- Cause of death: Murdered by Alexander the Great
- Relatives: Lanike (sister)
- Military career
- Allegiance: Macedonia
- Commands: Companion cavalry
- Conflicts: Wars of Alexander the Great: Battle of the Granicus

Cleitus the Black (Ancient Greek: Κλεῖτος ὁ μέλας; c. 375 BC – 328 BC) was an officer of the Macedonian army led by Alexander the Great. He saved Alexander's life at the Battle of the Granicus in 334 BC, only to be murdered by him in a drunken quarrel six years later. Cleitus was the son of Dropidas and brother of Alexander's nurse, Lanike. He would be given the epithet 'the Black' to distinguish him from Cleitus the White.

== Military service ==
Cleitus was made a commander of the Macedonian Cavalry under Philip II, a position he would retain under Alexander the Great.

At the Battle of the Granicus in 334 BC, when Alexander was being assailed by both Rhosaces and Spithridates, Cleitus severed Spithridates's arm before the Persian satrap could bring it down on Alexander, thus saving his life.

He would later be promoted to one of the two commanders of the companion cavalry following the trial and execution of Philotas.

== Death ==
In 328 BC, Artabazos resigned his satrapy of Bactria, and Alexander gave it to Cleitus. On the eve of the day on which he was to set out to take possessions of his government, Alexander organized a banquet during a feast day for Dionysus in the satrapial palace at Maracanda (what is now the city of Samarkand). At this banquet a dispute arose between generals in Alexander's command and Alexander himself.

Most of the members were intoxicated from drinking wine, and Alexander announced a reorganization of commands. Specifically, Cleitus was given orders to take 16,000 of the defeated Greek mercenaries who formerly fought for the Persian king north to fight steppe nomads.

Cleitus knew that he would no longer be near the king and would be a forgotten man. Furious at the thought of commanding what he saw as second-rate soldiers and fighting nomads in the middle of nowhere, he spoke his mind. To make matters worse, when Alexander arrogantly boasted that his accomplishments were far greater than that of his father, Phillip II, Cleitus responded by saying that Alexander was not the legitimate king of the Macedonians, and that all of his achievements were due to his father. Alexander called for his guards, but they did not want to intervene in a quarrel between friends.

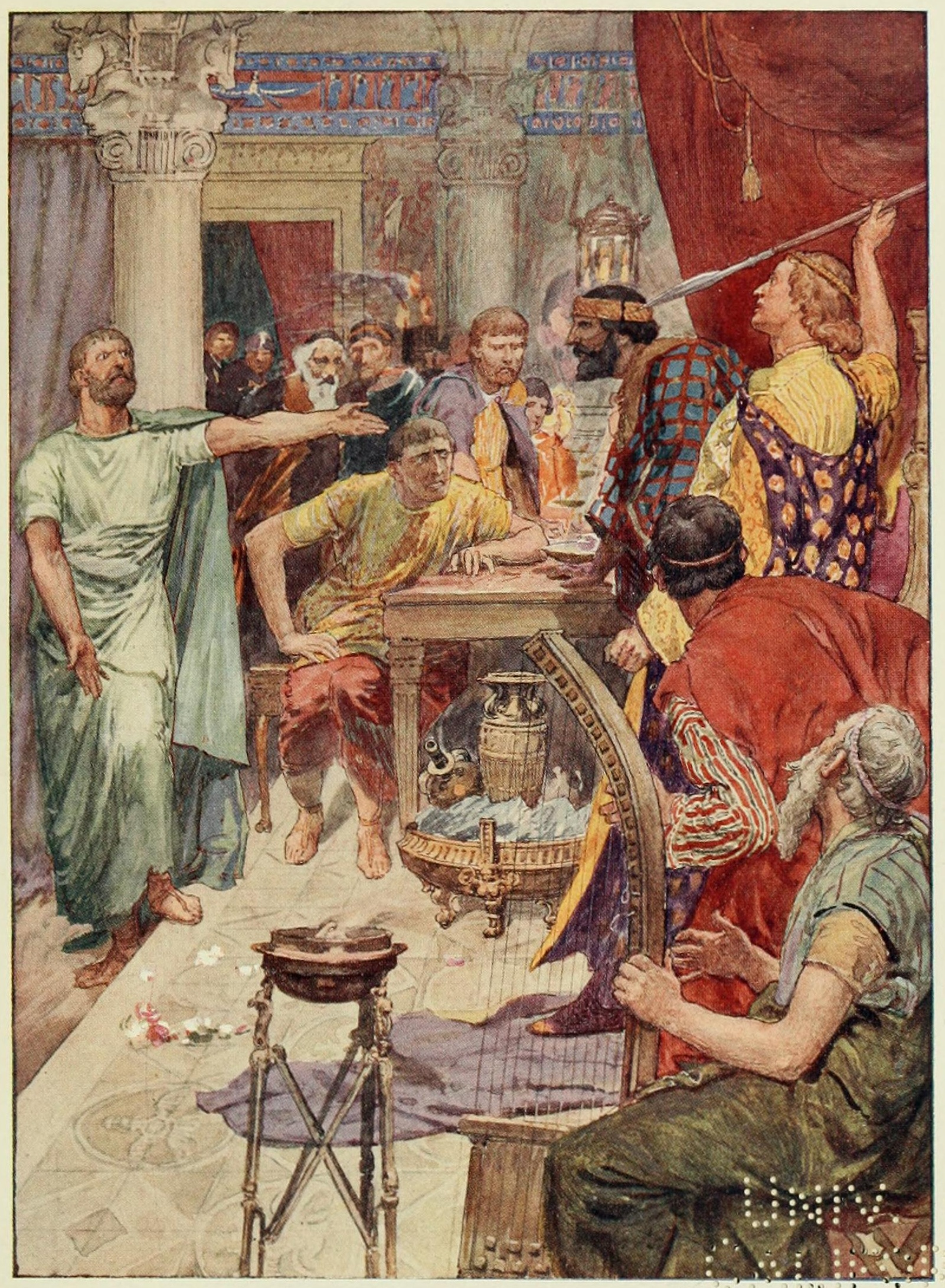
The quarrel between Alexander and Cleitus

Alexander threw an apple at Cleitus' head and called for a dagger or spear, but the party near the two men removed the dagger, restrained Alexander, and hustled Cleitus out of the room. The Hypaspists had conveniently left the vicinity of Alexander. Alexander then called for his trumpeter to summon the army; the alarm was not sounded. Nevertheless, Cleitus managed to return to the room to utter more grievances against Alexander (it is possible that Cleitus had not even left the room). But sources agree that at this point Alexander retrieved a pike and threw it at Cleitus's chest, killing him.

In all of the four major known texts, it is shown that Alexander grieved for the death of Cleitus. It is said that after killing Cleitus, Alexander "propped the pike against the wall with the intention of falling upon it himself, thinking that it was not proper for him to live who had killed his friend when under the influence of wine".

The motives of Cleitus in this quarrel have been interpreted in various ways. Cleitus may have been angered at Alexander's increasing adoption of Persian customs. After the death of King Darius III, Alexander was legally King of the Persian Empire. Alexander was now employing eunuchs and was tolerant of such Persian customs as proskynesis, which was considered degrading by many in the Macedonian army.

== Cultural references ==
- Cleitus, as Clito, appears as a character in Handel's opera Alessandro.
- The American poet John Berryman recounts the tale of "Kleitos" in his thirty-third "dream song."
- Cleitus, played by Gary Stretch, is a supporting character in the film Alexander. His death scene in the film is consistent with the historical sources.
- Cleitus' death is also described in Mary Butts' 1931 novel The Macedonian.
- Cleitus' story is recalled in Henry V in comparing Sir John Falstaff and King Henry V to Cleitus and Alexander in Act IV Scene 7 Lines 33–50.
- Seneca the Younger makes a reference to Cleitus' death in letter 83 of his book Epistulae Morales ad Lucilium.
- Appears as a unit in Civilization VI during the Conquests of Alexander scenario.
- Cleitus' life and death is featured throughout the story of the Age of Empires II: Definitive Edition campaign Chronicles: Alexander the Great.
