= Agathon (son of Tyrimmas) =

4th-century BC Macedonian cavalry commander

Agathon (Greek: Ἀγάθων) son of Tyrimmas was the Macedonian commander of Thracian cavalry during Alexander's campaign. He played a role in the elimination of Parmenion but later he was executed by Alexander.
