= Historiography of Alexander the Great =

Area of study on military commander and king

There are numerous surviving ancient Greek and Latin sources on Alexander the Great, king of Macedon, as well as some Asian texts. The five main surviving accounts are by Arrian, Plutarch, Diodorus Siculus, Quintus Curtius Rufus, and Justin. In addition to these five main sources, there is the Metz Epitome, an anonymous late Latin work that narrates Alexander's campaigns from Hyrcania to India. Much is also recounted incidentally by other authors, including Strabo, Athenaeus, Polyaenus, Aelian, and others. Strabo, who gives a summary of Callisthenes, is an important source for Alexander's journey to Siwah.

== Contemporary sources ==
Most primary sources written by people who actually knew Alexander or who gathered information from men who served with Alexander are lost, but a few inscriptions and fragments survive. Contemporaries who wrote accounts of his life include Alexander's campaign historian Callisthenes; Alexander's generals Ptolemy and Nearchus; Aristobulus, a junior officer on the campaigns; and Onesicritus, Alexander's chief helmsman. Finally, there is the very influential account of Cleitarchus who, while not a direct witness of Alexander's expedition, used sources which had just been published. His work was to be the backbone of that of Timagenes, who heavily influenced many historians whose work still survives. None of his works survived, but we do have later works based on these primary sources.

== The five main sources ==
=== Arrian ===
"That Alexander should have committed errors in conduct from impetuosity or from wrath, and that he should have been induced to comport himself like the Persian monarchs to an immoderate degree, I do not think remarkable if we fairly consider both his youth and his uninterrupted career of good fortune. I do not think that even his tracing his origin to a god was a great error on Alexander's part if it was not perhaps merely a device to induce his subjects to show him reverence". (Arrian 7b 29)

- Indica, written in the 2nd century AD, mainly describes the voyage of Alexander the Great's officer Nearchus from the Indus to the Persian Gulf following Alexander's conquest of much of the Indus Valley.

=== Plutarch ===
- Life of Alexander (see Parallel Lives) and two orations On the Fortune or the Virtue of Alexander the Great (see Moralia), by the Greek historian and biographer Plutarch of Chaeronea in the second century, based largely on Aristobulus and especially Cleitarchus. Plutarch devotes a great deal of space to Alexander's drive and desire and strives to determine how much of it was presaged in his youth. He also draws extensively on the work of Lysippus, Alexander's favorite sculptor, to provide what is probably the fullest and most accurate description of the conqueror's physical appearance. Plutarch also admits the impossibility of pure accuracy, noting that his sources are likely unreliable and that the purpose of his work is to give a moralistic and heroic interpretation of Alexander's life, stating: "For it is not Histories that I am writing, but Lives."

=== Diodorus ===
- Bibliotheca historica (Library of world history), written in Greek by the Sicilian historian Diodorus Siculus, from which Book 17 relates the conquests of Alexander, based almost entirely on Cleitarchus and Hieronymus of Cardia. It is the oldest surviving Greek source (1st century BC). Diodorus regarded Alexander like Caesar as a key historical figure and chronological marker.

=== Curtius ===
- Historiae Alexandri Magni, a biography of Alexander in ten books, of which the last eight survive, by the Roman historian Quintus Curtius Rufus, written in the 1st century AD, and based largely on Cleitarchus through the mediation of Timagenes, with some material probably from Ptolemy.

=== Justin ===
- The Epitome of the Philippic History of Pompeius Trogus by Justin, is highly compressed version of an earlier history by Trogus, with the selections governed by Justin's desire to make moralistic points, rather than with an eye for the history itself.

== Letters ==
Alexander wrote and received numerous letters, but no originals survive. A few official letters addressed to the Greek cities survive in copies inscribed in stone and the content of others is sometimes reported in historical sources. These only occasionally quote the letters and it is an open question how reliable such quotations are. Several fictitious letters, some perhaps based on actual letters, made their way into the Romance tradition.

== Ephemerides of Alexander the Great ==
The Ephemerides of Alexander were journals describing Alexander's daily activities. Mentioned by ancient writers, but only fragments survive today. The Ephemerides is credited either to Eumenes or to Diodotus of Erythrae, though the latter name may have been a pseudonym.

Suda writes that one of the works of Strattis of Olynthus was called "On the ephemerides of Alexander" and were five books.

== Lost works ==
- Life of Alexander by Aesopus
- Works of Anaximenes of Lampsacus
- Works of Aristobulus of Cassandreia
- Geographical work of Androsthenes of Thasos
- Deeds of Alexander by Callisthenes (the official historian)
- Personal Notebooks, or Hypomnemata, by Alexander himself (possibly inauthentic)
- History of Alexander by Cleitarchus
- On the empire of the Macedonians by Criton of Pieria
- Histories (also listed as Macedonica and Hellenica) by Duris of Samos
- Work of Ephippus of Olynthus
- Works of Strattis of Olynthus
- Work of Hagnothemis upon which Plutarch rested the belief that Antipater poisoned Alexander.
- Work of Hieronymus of Cardia
- On the education of Alexander and Macedonian history by Marsyas of Pella
- Work of Medius of Larissa
- Work of Nearchus, the primary source of Arrian's Indica
- How Alexander was Educated and geographical works by Onesicritus
- Work of Ptolemy I Soter
- Work of Nicobule
- Work of Antidamas
- History of Alexander by Timagenes
- Historiae Philippicae by Gnaeus Pompeius Trogus
- Nymphis wrote twenty-four books On Alexander, the Diadochoi and the Epigonoi.
- Work of Philo of Alexandria called "On Alexander".
- Work of Potamon of Mitylene called "On Alexander of Macedon".
- Work of Soterichus of Oasis.
- Work of Nikanor about the life of Alexander.
- Work of Hegesias of Magnesia, known only from fragments.
- "Σταθμοί τῆς Ἀλεξάνδρου πορείας" (Stages in Alexander's Journey/Stations of the march of Alexander), a work of Baeton (the Bematist of Alexander the Great).
- Work of Chares of Mytilene. Ten books about the life of Alexander.
- Jason of Argos wrote four books titled "On Greece". In the third book, he covered the reign of Alexander the Great up until his death.
- Menaechmus of Sikyon wrote about the reign of Alexander the Great.
- Work of Gnaeus Pompeius Trogus, some parts survive in the epitome by Justin.
- Work of Anticlides.
- The earliest version of the Alexander Romance. A now lost original Greek text, blending historical and fantastical elements. While later versions survive in many languages, the original form has been altered or lost.
- The Metz Epitome was a short summary of the life and conquests of Alexander the Great, likely written in late antiquity. Originally preserved in a manuscript housed in the library of Metz (hence the name), it was destroyed during World War II, though its content survives through earlier transcriptions.
- In 2023, researchers with the help of machine learning managed to read a small part of a book from the Villa of the Papyri at Herculaneum which was heavily damaged in the eruption of Mount Vesuvius in 79 AD. It seems that it is a lost work which contains the names of a number of Macedonian dynasts and generals of Alexander and several mentions of Alexander himself.

== Epigraphy ==
Epigraphic records associated with Alexander the Great:

- Decree of Philippi (ca.335-330 BC) Alexander arbitrates a boundary dispute between local Thracian tribes and the city of Philippi.
- The Priene inscription of Alexander the Great, a dedicatory inscription made by Alexander for the temple of Athena Polias in Priene. It is now housed in the British Museum.
- A dedicatory inscription to Apollo was found at Toumbes Kalamotou, Thessaloniki regional unit; it records a list of priests of Asclepius who had fulfilled their duties from the time when King Alexandros gave Kalindoia and the villages around to Makedones.
- A dedicatory inscription to Olympian Zeus by Philonides of Crete in which he is mentioned as King Alexandros' hemerodromos (cursor) and bematist of Asia.
- Lindos Chronicle. King Alexandros having defeated Darius in battle and become lord kurios of Asia, sacrificed to Athena of Lindos. boukephala (ox-heads) and hopla (armour)
- Antigonus (son of Callas) hetairos from Amphipolis, commemorates his victory in hoplite racing at Heraclean games after the Conquest of Tyrus.
- A bilingual inscription from Alexander the Great’s shrine at Bahariya Oasis. It features both Greek and Egyptian texts.
- Alexander depicted as an Egyptian pharaoh at the Luxor Temple.

== Non-Greco-Roman sources ==
=== Babylonian Chronicles ===
- Alexander Chronicle mentions the battle of Gaugamela and the incident of Bessus, who was pursued by Aliksandar.
- Alexander and Arabia Chronicle refers to events concerning the last years of the King.

=== Zoroastrian texts ===
They say that, once upon a time, the pious Zartosht made the religion, which he had received, current in the world; and till the completion of 300 years, the religion was in purity, and men were without doubts. But afterward, the accursed evil spirit, the wicked one, in order to make men doubtful of this religion, instigated the accursed Alexander, the Rûman, who was dwelling in Egypt, so that he came to the country of Iran with severe cruelty and war and devastation; he also slew the ruler of Iran, and destroyed the metropolis and empire, and made them desolate.

=== The Bible ===
Daniel 8:5–8 and 21–22 states that a King of Greece will conquer the Medes and Persians but then die at the height of his power and have his kingdom broken into four kingdoms. This is sometimes taken as a reference to Alexander.

Alexander is briefly mentioned in the first Book of the Maccabees. In chapter 1, verses 1–7 are about Alexander and serve as an introduction of the book. This explains how the Greek influence reached the Land of Israel at that time.

=== The Quran ===
There is evidence to suggest that orally transmitted legends about Alexander the Great found their way to the Quran. In the story of Dhu al-Qarnayn, "The Two-Horned One" (chapter al-Kahf, verse 83–94), Dhu al-Qarnayn is identified by most Western and traditional Muslim scholars as a reference to Alexander the Great.
