= Odontotyrannos =

Legendary creature appearing in stories of Alexander the Great

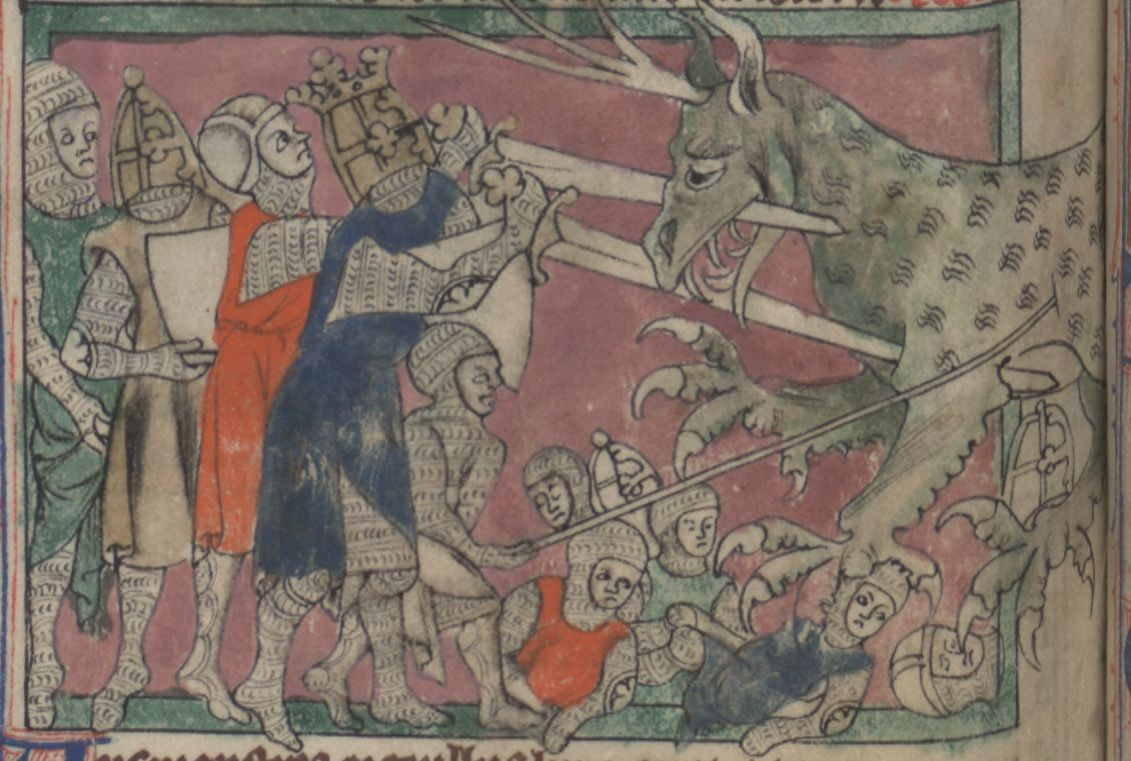
The Macedonians attacked by the dent-tyrant or Odontotyrrannus. —14th century, ms. of Thomas de Kent's romance. Bibliothèque nationale fr. 24364

Odontotyrannos (Greek: όδοντοτύραννος), also odontotyrannus or dentityrannus (Note: Also dentes tirannus, dentestyrannus) ("tooth-tyrant") is a mythical three-horned beast said to have attacked Alexander the Great and his men at their camp in India, according to the apocryphal Letter from Alexander to Aristotle and other medieval romantic retellings of Alexandrian legend.

== Descriptions ==
According to the Latin Letter from Alexander, the creature had a black, horse-like head with three horns protruding from its forehead, and exceeded the size of an elephant. It was undeterred by the sight of fire, killing twenty-six (Note: Or thirty-six, in some variants of the legend.) Macedonians and incapacitating fifty-two before being put down by thrusts from hunting spears. The local Indians reportedly called the beast "tooth-tyrant" (dentityrranus or odontatyrannus). (Note: Some manuscripts and Kübler's edition read "odontatyrannum" with an "a".)

A fourth-century Latin translation of the Alexander Romance by Julius Valerius Alexander Polemius, known as the Res gestae Alexandri Macedonis, spells the beast's name as odontotyrannus and states that the strength of 300 men was required to drag its body out of the river. (Note: Latin text reads:".. vix trecentorum hominum manus nisu extractus de flumine") In the Syriac version of Pseudo-Callisthenes, it is the Mashḳělath or Mashklet (Syriac: ܡܫܩܠܬ) which causes 26 casualties among the Macedons and requires 300 men to tug out of a ditch, and in the Armenian version 1,300 were needed for the job. (Note: In the Armenian, the beast is called a "unicorn" or "one horned beast" (Wolohojian tr.))

In the Ethiopic version, it is an elephant-sized beast with tusks that attacks; this creature is unnamed but corresponds to the odontotyrannus. When it is eviscerated, the Macedonians discover among its stomach contents scorpions as well as large fish the size of an ox. In the 5th-century On the Life of the Brahmans by the Greek writer Palladius (Note: One abridged recension is referred to as Commonitorium Palladii de Bragmanis (Stoneman 2012, pp. xxv, 113n).) and the 9th-century writings of George Hamartolos, the odontotyrannus (όδοντοτύραννος) is an amphibious carnivore that can devour an elephant.

In Li romans d'Alixandre of Alexandre de Bernay, the beast is named tirant, and in Thomas de Kent's Roman de toute chevalerie, the Old French name is dent-tyrant. In the Middle English King Alisaunder, the name is given as "deutyrauns". (Note: Skeat 1886, p. 309n's "deutyrans" appears to be a typographical error.)

== Zoological identifications ==
Many scholars have identified various large beasts in the animal kingdom as to its identity. Budge suggested it may be a crocodilian native to the Ganges, and hinted the Syriac name might be a corruption of the makara, a composite creature in Hindu mythology. It may also be based on Ctesias's description of the giant fanged Indus worm. The makara theory and Ctesia's influence is also supported by Gunderson. Others proposed a rhinoceros, though conceded it may just be an imaginary creature.

== Reconstructed Sanskrit name ==
Christian Lassen in the 19th century reconstructed the original name of this beast to be *dantešvara "lord of teeth", from danta "tooth" and īšvara "the Lord". This unattested form was rejected by Roger Goossens, who proposed instead dvijarāja which carries the dual meaning of "king of reptiles" or "king of teeth".
