= Alberic of Besançon =

Start of Alberic's surviving fragment

Alberic of Besançon was the 12th-century author of a fragmentary poem about Alexander the Great in Franco-Provençal.

== Biography ==
Alberic was active in the first half of the 12th century, since Lamprecht reworked his poem into German as the Alexanderlied around 1155.

Alberic's name is known only from citations in works derivative of his. Lamprecht calls him Alberich von Bisinzo (or maister Albrich). Alexander of Paris, who reworked it into French, calls him Auberin li canoine. The spelling Auberin probably reflects a misreading of Auberiu, the Franco-Provençal form. The name may be rendered in modern French Albéric, Auberi or Aubry.

The identity of Bisinzo has been debated. It most obviously refers to Besançon, which lay north of the Franco-Provençal zone. Several places where Franco-Provençal was spoken have been suggested as alternatives: Pisançon, Pizançon or Briançon. It is possible, however, that Alberic was born in Besançon but chose to write in Franco-Provençal. The northern dialect of Besançon, Frainc-Comtou, was at least influenced by Franco-Provençal from the south, since Besançon lay in the north of the Kingdom of Arles at the time. It is also possible that Alberic was not a native of Besançon but only active there. The titles master and canon are consistent with his being a canon of Besançon Cathedral.

A canon of Besançon named Alberic is mentioned in a document of 1132 under Archbishop Anseric. He was an archpriest of the church of the Magdalene. His identification with the poet is only tentative.

== Poem ==
Alberic's poem, of which only 105 verses are preserved, is the earliest version of the Alexander Romance in a European vernacular and in the Gallic Roman d'Alexandre tradition in particular. It is based on the Latin translation of Julius Valerius, the Res gestae Alexandri Macedonis, and on its abridgement, the Zacher Epitome. It is found in a single manuscript now in Florence.

Alberic's poem consists of "octosyllabic monorhyming assonating laisses". Since it was common for an author to name himself in the final stanza, it is likely that the poem was a finished work when Lamprecht saw it. Comparison with the Alexanderlied, however, implies that Alberic dealt only with the childhood and youth of Alexander, ending probably with the siege of Tyre.

The surviving verses of Alberic's poem have been edited and translated into modern French by Alfred Foulet, who also translated into French those passages of the Alexanderlied that are probably derived from it. It has not been translated into English.

== Source ==
- Foulet, Alfred, ed. (1949). The Medieval French Roman d'Alexandre. Vol. 3: Version of Alexandre de Paris (Text, Variants and Notes to Branch I). Princeton University Press.
- Mölk, Ulrich (2000). "Le poème d'Alexandre du chanoine Albéric". In Miren Lacassagne (ed.). Ce nous dist li escris… Che est la verite. Presses universitaires de Provence.
- Ross, D. J. A. (1963). Alexander Historiatus: A Guide to Medieval Illustrated Alexander Literature. The Warburg Institute, University of London.
- Zufferey, François (2007). "Perspectives nouvelles sur l'Alexandre d'Auberi de Besançon". Zeitschrift für romanische Philologie. 123 (3): 385–418. doi:10.1515/zrph.2007.385.
