= Personal relationships of Alexander the Great =

Relationships of Alexander the Great

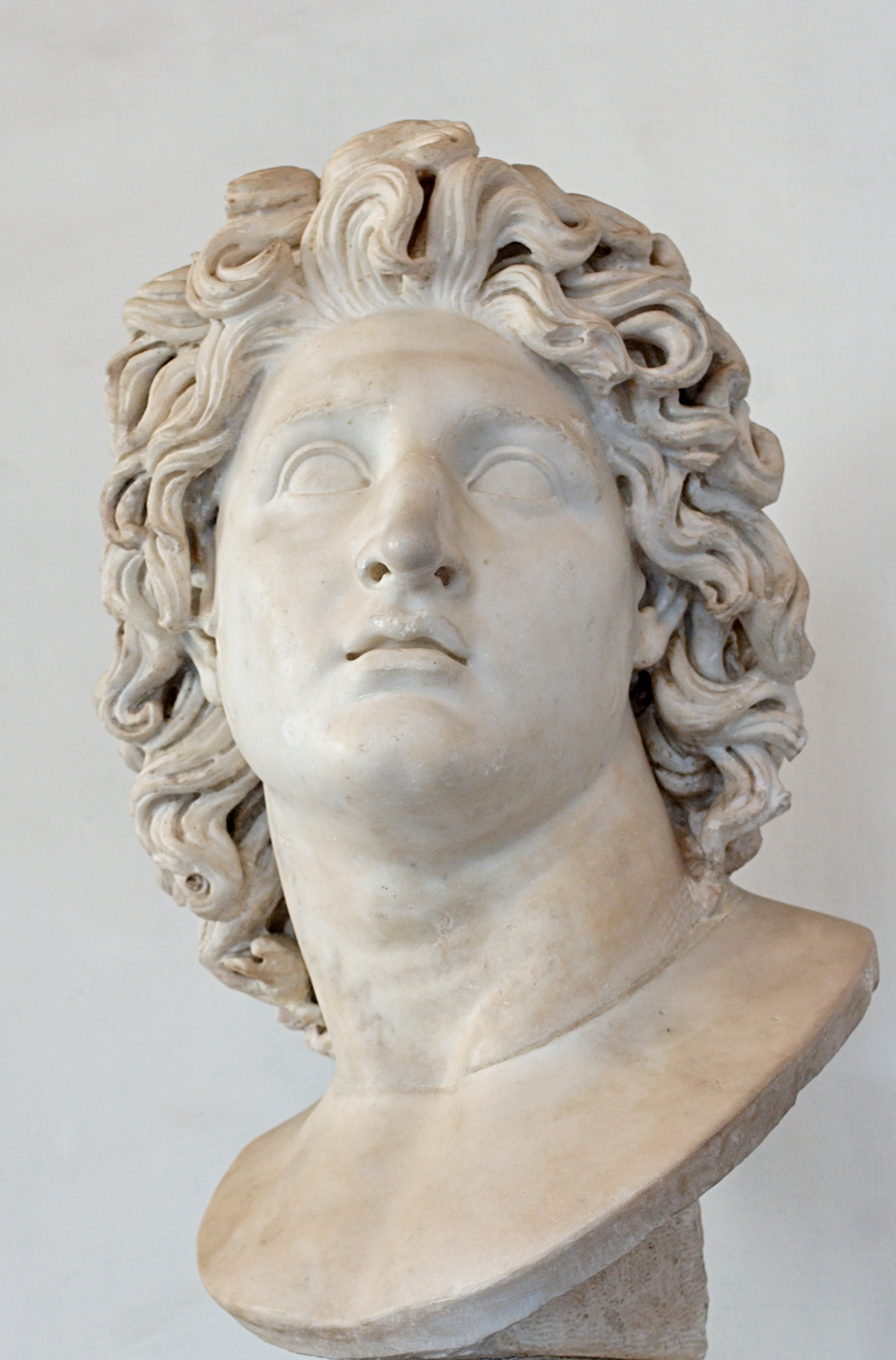
Alexander-Helios, Roman copy after Hellenistic original, c. 3rd–2nd century BC.

The historical and literary tradition describes several of Alexander's relations, some of which are the subject of question among modern historians.

== Relationships ==
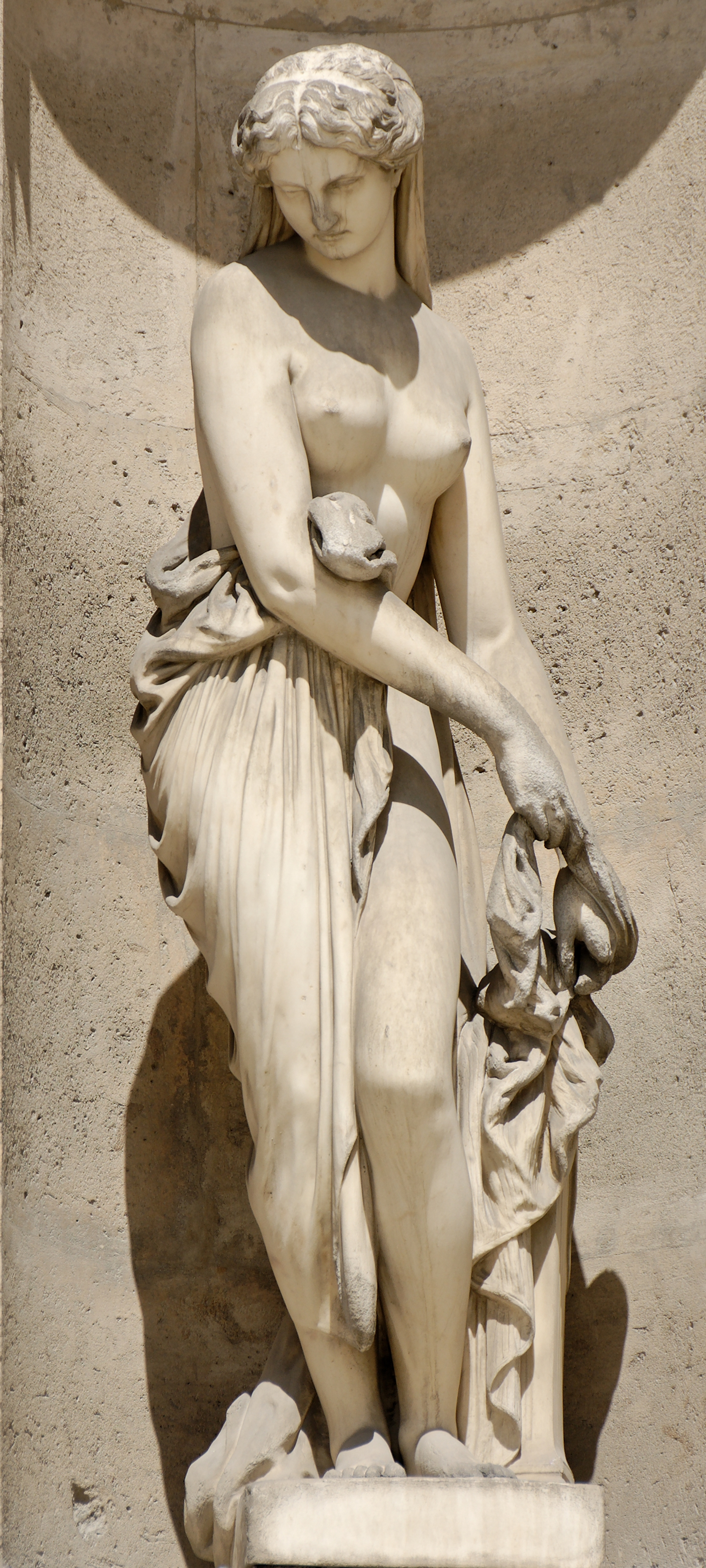
Campaspe taking off her clothes in front of Apelles by order of Alexander, c.1883 by Auguste Ottin (1811–1890).

Curtius reports, "He scorned sensual pleasures to such an extent that his mother was anxious lest he be unable to beget offspring." To encourage a relationship with a woman, his parents King Philip and Olympias were said to have brought in a high-priced Thessalian courtesan named Callixena. According to Athenaeus, Callixena was employed by Olympias out of fear that Alexander was "womanish" (γύvνις, gynnis), and his mother used to beg him to sleep with the courtesan, apparently to no success. Some modern historians, such as James Davidson, see this as evidence of Alexander's homosexuality. Alexander's sexual orientation has been the matter of ongoing debate. William Woodthorpe Tarn claimed there is "not one scrap of evidence for calling Alexander homosexual", but that is contradicted by several ancient sources whose authors believed Hephaestion, Bagoas, Hector and Excipinos to be Alexander's male lovers.

According to Plutarch, the only woman with whom Alexander had sex before his first marriage was Barsine, daughter of Artabazos II of Phrygia. Ancient reports state that Alexander and Barsine became lovers, as he was enthralled by her beauty and knowledge of Greek literature. Barsine gave birth to a boy named Heracles, believed to be Alexander's son.

Alexander married three times: to Roxana of Bactria, Stateira (daughter of Darius III) and Parysatis (daughter of Artaxerxes III). He and Roxana had two children together. According to the Metz Epitome, their first-born son was born in India and died there as an infant in the autumn of 326 BC; it is alleged by Alexander Hebrew Romance that he too was named Alexander. The pair's second child was Alexander IV, born soon after Alexander the Great's death in 323 BC. There is speculation that Stateira could also have been pregnant at the time of her husband's demise; if so, her child was never born, as she was assasinated at the Roxana's order immiediately after the King had died.

Ancient authors saw Alexander's limited sexual affairs before marriage as proof of his self-control in regards to sensual pleasures, and accounts are also known of Alexander's stern refusal to accept indiscreet offers from men who tried to pimp him male prostitutes, among whom, according to Aeschines and Hypereides, was the renowned Athenian orator Demosthenes. According to Carystius (as quoted by Athenaeus), when Alexander praised the beauty of a boy at a gathering, probably a slave belonging to one Charon of Chalcis, the latter asked the boy to kiss Alexander, but the King refused, to spare Charon the embarrassment of having to share his boy's affections.

On other hand, Diodorus Siculus paints the licentious picture of the King, following his accession of Persian throne:

Then he put on the Persian diadem and dressed himself in the white robe and the Persian sash and everything else except the trousers and the long-sleeved upper garment. He distributed to his companions cloaks with purple borders and dressed the horses in Persian harness. In addition to all this, he added concubines to his retinue in the manner of Darius, in number not less than the days of the year and outstanding in beauty as selected from all the women of Asia. Each night these paraded about the couch of the king so that he might select the one with whom he would lie that night. Alexander, as a matter of fact, employed these customs rather sparingly and kept for the most part to his accustomed routine, not wishing to offend the Macedonians."

Plutarch also recounts Alexander once sought a sexual encounter with Theodorus's music girl, saying to him that "if you don't have lust for your music-girl, send her to me for ten talents."

Two ancient historians, Siculus and Curtius, tell of Alexander spending thirteen days with a tribe-leader of woman-warriors hailing from the Caucasus Mountains, however this appears alongside many other hyperbolized aspects of his character and achievements, and ancient historians did not distinguish between myth and history in the same way historians do today.

Diodorus and Metz Epitome mention Alexander allying with and taking as his vassal an unnamed Indian queen, whose story is expanded in writings of Curtius, Orosius and Justin, where she is known as "Cleophis or Cleophylis" and is reported to enter the sexual dalliance with Alexander. Additionally, Curtius and Justin claim the union resulted in a son (named Alexander) who eventually inherited the throne of Assacani, but this information is considered by most historians to be much later romantic invention, having possibly been remodelled story of Cleopatra who also was female head of state and had a son-namesake with her protector.

=== Aristotle ===
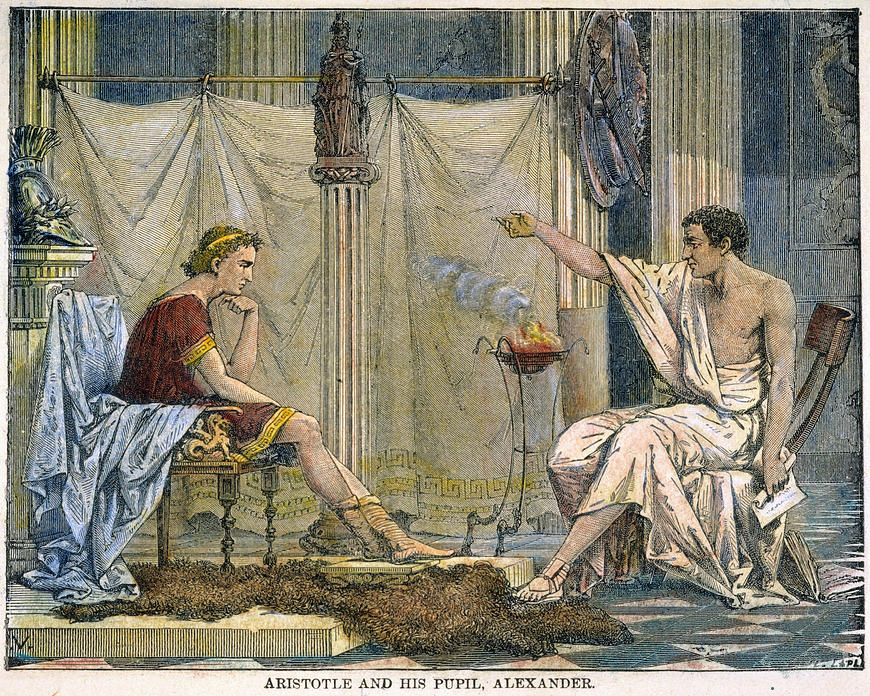
Aristotle teaching young Alexander, engraving by Charles Laplante, c. 1866

Aristotle was the head of the royal academy of Macedon and, in 343 BC, Philip II of Macedon invited him to serve as the tutor for the prince, Alexander. Alexander received inspiration for his eastward conquests, as Aristotle was encouraged to become: "a leader to the Greeks and a despot to the barbarians, to look after the former as after friends and relatives, and to deal with the latter as with beasts or plants". Aristotle held ethnocentric views against Persia, which estranged him and Alexander as the latter adopted a few of the Persian royal customs and clothing. This tension led to ancient rumors that painted Aristotle as a suspect for Alexander’s death, but this rumor spread based on a single claim made six years after Alexander’s passing.

Alexander also received his primary education on the Persian customs and traditions through Aristotle. Upon Aristotle’s publication of his geographic work, Alexander lamented, "Thou hast not done well to publish thy acroamatic doctrines; for in what shall I surpass other men if those doctrines wherein I have been trained are to be all men's common property?" Aristotle’s tutelage is also attributed as the reason why Alexander brought an entourage of zoologists, botanists, philosophers, and other researchers on his expeditions deep into the east. Through those expeditions Alexander discovered that much of the geography he learned from Aristotle was plainly wrong.

=== Hephaestion ===
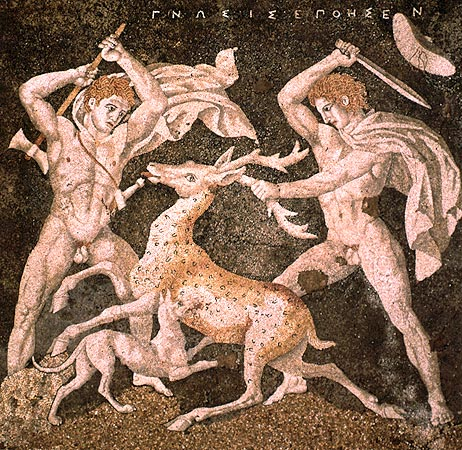
The emblema of the Stag Hunt Mosaic, c. 300 BC, from Pella

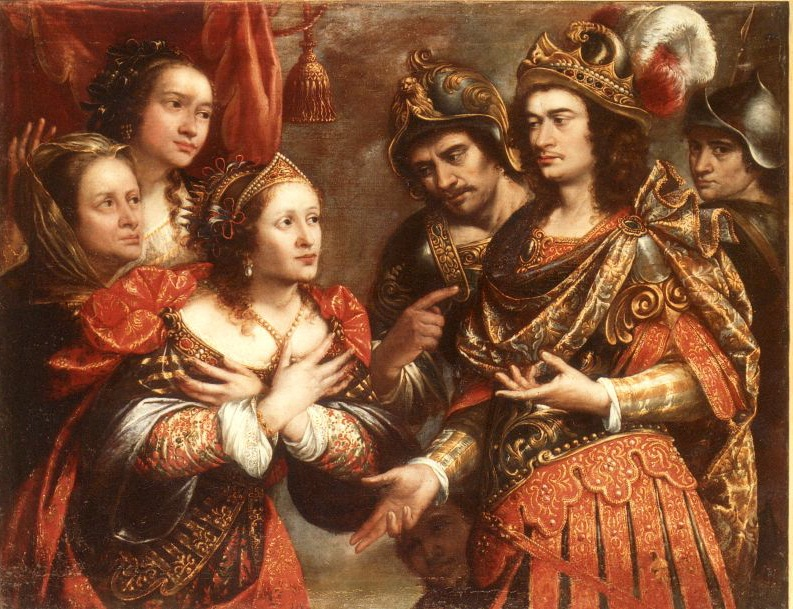
The family of Darius in front of Alexander, by Justus Sustermans and preserved in the Biblioteca Museu Víctor Balaguer. This picture features Hephaestion pointing out Alexander.

Alexander had a close emotional attachment to his companion, cavalry commander (hipparchus) and childhood friend, Hephaestion. He studied with Alexander, as did a handful of other children of Ancient Macedonian aristocracy, under the tutelage of Aristotle. Hephaestion makes his appearance in history at the point when Alexander reaches Troy. There they made sacrifices at the shrines of the two heroes Achilles and Patroclus; Alexander honouring Achilles, and Hephaestion honouring Patroclus.

After Hephaestion's death in October 324 BC, Alexander mourned him greatly and did not eat for days. Alexander held an elaborate funeral for Hephaestion at Babylon, and sent a note to the shrine of Ammon, which had previously acknowledged Alexander as a god, asking them to grant Hephaestion divine honours. The priests declined, but did offer him the status of divine hero. Alexander died soon after receiving this letter; Mary Renault suggests that his grief over Hephaestion's death had led him to be careless with his health. Alexander was overwhelmed by his grief for Hephaestion, so much that Arrian records that Alexander "flung himself on the body of his friend and lay there nearly all day long in tears, and refused to be parted from him until he was dragged away by force by his Companions".

==== Nature of relationship ====
Based on the closeness between the two, it was suggested by modern historians that the relationship between Alexander and Hephaestion was romantic and/or sexual.

Several ancient authors appear to imply or to express outward believe the two men were lovers. Arrian mentions in his Discourses of Epictetus the claim Alexander ordered the temple of Asclepius to be burnt after his eromenos ("beloved") died; while the latter is unnamed, Arrian says in his other work Anabasis that Alexander was reported to commit such a deed after the death of Hephaestion – by default, according to Daniel Ogden, the anonymous lover from Discourses should be identified with Hephaestion. Justin claims Hephaestion was "dear" to Alexander because of the former's "beauty (forma) and boyishness (pueritia), and because of the services (obsequia) he performed for him [Alexander]", which Ogden interpretes as implication of the commander's "sexual services" to the King. The Letters contains outward claim the two men were lovers with the text stating that Alexander was "controlled by Hephaestion's thighs", though it's uncertain how historically accurate this information is, as the source is "spurious" and "late". Additionally, while not explicitly identifying the two as lovers, Diodorus Siculus, Quintus Curtius Rufus and Lucian also appear to imply in their works that Alexander and Hephaestion had an affair.

Aelian cites in Vara Historia that during garlanding of the tomb of Patroclus, Hephaestion was "riddling [ainittomenos] that he too was a beloved (eromenos) of Alexander, just as Patroclus was of Achilles." While the reference ostensibly depict Alexander and Hephaestion as lovers, Ogden points that it may refer be riddle posed by Hephaestion to the witnesses of his act (or by Aelian creating his own interpretation of the events) to express ambiguous nature of his relationship with Alexander, just like Achilles and Patroclus's relationship was seen as ambiguous among Greek and Roman authors.

Among modern scholars Paul Cartledge asserts that any attempt to "expunge all trace, or taint, of homosexuality" from Alexander and Hephaestion's relationship is "seriously misguided". In Robin Lane Fox's view "later gossip claimed that Alexander [and Hephaestion] had a love affair. No contemporary history states this, but the facts show that the two men's friendship was exceptionally deep and close." Cartledge believes that the two "almost certainly" physically expressed their love at one or more stages in their lives, and speculates that if Hephaestion was Alexander's "catamite", the stigma attached to being the passive sexual partner is not something that Hephaestion would have wished to boast about. Ogden, however, notes the presence of several known pairs of mature male lovers on the royal court of both Alexander and his father Philip II of Macedon, and suggests societal tolerance of such couples in high spheres of ancient Macedonia, comparable with similar examples of apparent acceptance of same-sex male observed during the same time in Thebes.

=== Campaspe ===
Campaspe, also known as Pancaste, is thought to have been a prominent citizen of Larissa in Thessaly, and may have been the mistress of Alexander. If this is true, she was one of the first women with whom Alexander was intimate; Aelian even surmises that it was to her that a young Alexander lost his virginity.

One story tells that Campaspe was painted by Apelles, who enjoyed the reputation in Antiquity for being the greatest of painters. The episode occasioned an apocryphal exchange that was reported in the sources for the life of Alexander in Pliny's Natural History. Robin Lane Fox traces her legend back to the Roman authors Pliny the Elder, Lucian of Samosata and Aelian's Varia Historia.

Campaspe became a generic poetical pseudonym for a man's mistress.

=== Barsine ===
Barsine was a noble Greek-Persian, daughter of Artabazus, and wife of Memnon. After Memnon's death, several ancient historians have written of a love affair between her and Alexander. Plutarch writes, "At any rate Alexander, so it seems, thought it more worthy of a king to subdue his own passions than to conquer his enemies, and so he never came near these women, nor did he associate with any other before his marriage, with the exception only of Barsine. This woman, the widow of Memnon, the Greek mercenary commander, was captured at Damascus. She had received a Greek education, was of a gentle disposition, and could claim royal descent, since her father was Artabazus who had married one of the Persian king's daughters. These qualities made Alexander the more willing he was encouraged by Parmenio, so Aristobulus tells us, to form an attachment to a woman of such beauty and noble lineage." In addition Justin writes, "As he afterwards contemplated the wealth and display of Darius, he was seized with admiration of such magnificence. Hence it was that he first began to indulge in luxurious and splendid banquets, and fell in love with his captive Barsine for her beauty, by whom he had afterwards a son that he called Heracles."

We know almost nothing about boy's twelve years after Alexander's death, when he became a claimant to the Macedonian throne. Mary Renault argues that the romance with Barsine was invented by the boy's backers to validate his parentage. However, according to Strabo, Perdiccas took on his campaign to Egypt in 321 BC Alexander's "children" (paidoi, plural), which would imply Alexander IV and Heracles himself, since they were only known children of Alexander III alive at that point; this would suggest the royal court was well aware of both Heracles's existence as well as the late King's paternity of him.

According to Justin, Alexander the Great named Heracles himself, presumably in the honour of his mythical ancestor, Heracles.

=== Roxana ===
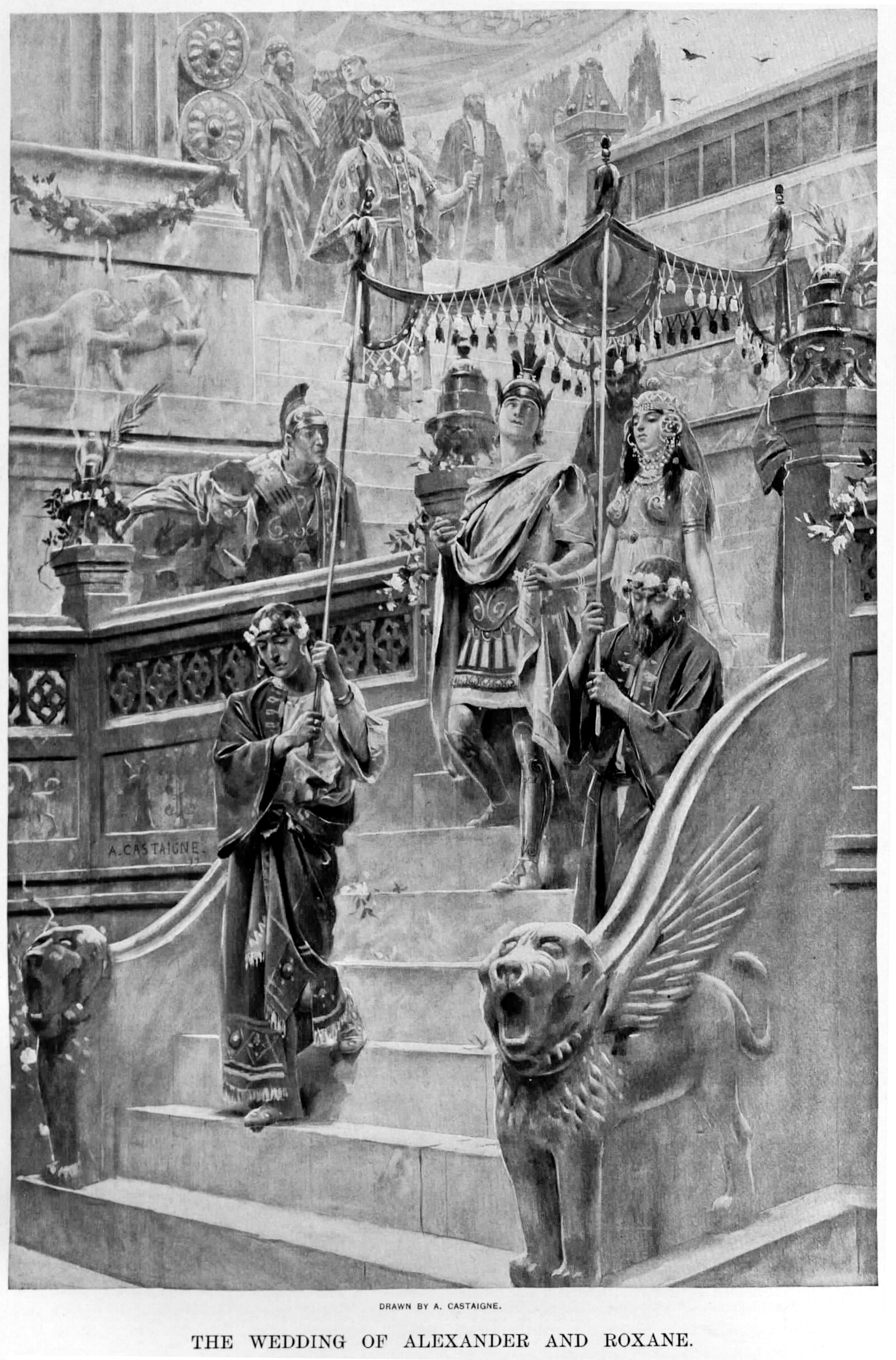
Wedding of Alexander and Roxane by André Castaigne, c. 1898-1899.

Roxana of Bactria became Alexander's wife in 327 BC. Robin Lane Fox writes about her: "Roxana was said by contemporaries to be the most beautiful lady in all Asia. She deserved her name of Roshanak, meaning 'little star'". Marriage to a local noble's family made sound political sense, but contemporaries implied that Alexander also lost his heart. A wedding-feast for the two of them was arranged high on one of the Persian rocks. Alexander and his bride shared a loaf of bread, a custom still observed in Turkestan. Characteristically, Alexander sliced it with his sword. In Ulrich Wilcken's opinion: "The fairest prize that fell to him [Alexander] was Roxana, the daughter of Oxyartes, in the first bloom of youth, and in the judgment of Alexander's companions, next to Stateira the wife of Darius, the most beautiful woman that they had seen in Asia. Alexander fell passionately in love with her and determined to raise her to the position of his consort."

As soon as Alexander died in 323 BC, Roxana murdered Alexander's two other wives. Roxana wished to cement her own position and that of her son, unborn at that time, by ridding herself of a rival who could be or claim to be pregnant. According to Plutarch's account, Stateira's sister, Drypetis, was murdered at the same time; Carney believes that Plutarch was mistaken, and it was actually Parysatis who died with Stateira.

Roxana bore Alexander two children: a first-born son who died as an infant in 326 BC, and Alexander IV, born after Alexander the Great's death.

=== Bagoas ===
Ancient sources tell of Alexander's male lover, Bagoas; a eunuch "in the very flower of boyhood, with whom Darius was intimate and with whom Alexander would later be intimate." Plutarch recounts an episode (also mentioned by Dicaearchus) during some festivities on the way back from India in which his men clamor for him to kiss the young man: "We are told, too, that he was once viewing some contests in singing and dancing, being well heated with wine, and that the Macedonians' favourite [eromenos], Bagoas, won the prize for song and dance, and then, all in his festal array, passed through the theatre and took his seat by Alexander's side; at sight of which the Macedonians clapped their hands and loudly bade the king kiss the victor, until at last he threw his arms about him and kissed him tenderly." Athenaeus tells a slightly different version of the story — that Alexander kissed Bagoas in a theatre and, as his men shouted in approval, he repeated the action.

The Roman historian Quintus Curtius Rufus was highly critical of the relationship between Alexander and Bagoas, saying that Alexander was seized of such desire by the eunuch, that Bagoas became the de facto sovereign of Persia, exploiting Alexander's affections to make him persecute Bagoas's personal enemies, such as the Persian governor Orxines.

Daniel Ogden asserts there is "no strong reason to doubt the actuality of sexual relationship" between the pair. However, he acknowledges that "the most sustained representation of Bagoas' relationship with Alexander, Curtius', was shown to be structured primarily by artificial moral arcs (...) and by a will to play games with notions of effeminancy and power."

=== Excipinos ===
Mentioned only by Curtius, Excipinos was reported to be Alexander's another male lover. The account describes him as "beloved to Alexander because of the flower of his [Excipinos's] youth" and compares him to Hephaestion as "equaled (...) in the beauty of his body" but "not equal to him in manly charm."

=== Hector ===
Attested by Curtius and Justin, Hector is said by the former to be a male lover of Alexander. He was described as the boy "in the very flower of his youth (eximio aetatis flore)", who was "patricularly dear to Alexander (in pausis Alexandro carus)". According to Curtius, the youth died tragically due to mortal injuries sustained after falling overboard from the boat on the Nile in 322/321 BC, and was subsequently given a grand funeral by grief-stricken Alexander. Justin claims Hector drowned (as opposed to Curtius's version, in which he manages to get to the shore) either in the Nile or in the Euphrates, and seems to imply Alexander was somehow responsible for this death.

== See also ==
- Ancient Greek eros
