= Battle of the Elephants =

Galatian-Seleucid battle circa 275 BC

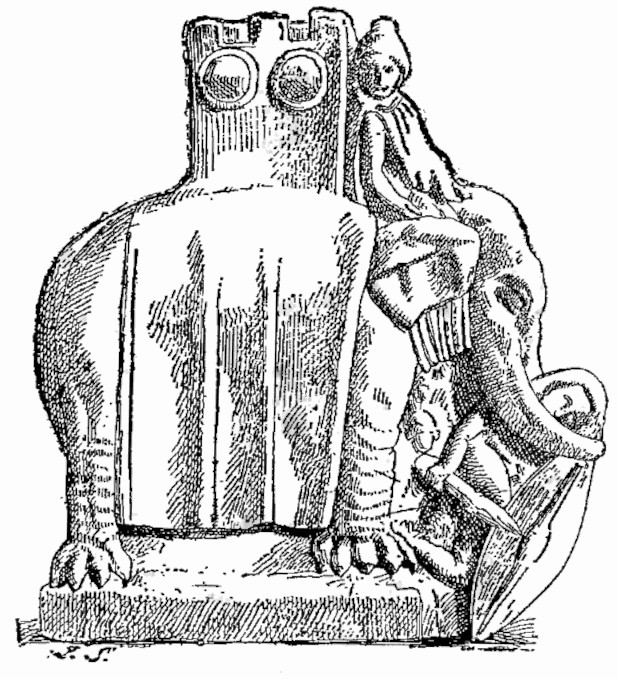
Terracotta figurine of a Seleucid war elephant trampling a Galatian warrior

The Battle of the Elephants (also Elephant Battle or Elephant Victory) was a military confrontation between the Galatians and the Seleucid Empire in central Anatolia around 275 BC. According to surviving descriptions, the Seleucids, commanded in person by Antiochus I, were victorious over a much larger force on account of their war elephants.

== Sources ==
The Battle of the Elephants is mentioned expressly in only two surviving sources, both centuries later than the event. The earlier and more detailed of these is Lucian of Samosata's Zeuxis sive Antiochus from the 2nd century AD. The other is the Suda, a 10th-century encyclopedia. The passing mentions of a battle between Antiochus I and the Galatians in Appian of Alexandria's Syriaca and Lucian's Pro lapsu in salutando probably refer to the Battle of the Elephants. Other possible reference are even less direct. The Prologi to the lost Historiae Philippicae of Pompeius Trogus contains the chapter heading, "How the Galatians went over to Asia and waged war on King Antiochus and Bithynia".

A terracotta figurine depicting a Seleucid war elephant with a mahout trampling a Galatian warrior has been found at Myrina. It is generally associated with the Battle of the Elephants. Lucian mentions a trophy bearing an elephant, but this is not the terracotta figurine. The theme of the Galatomachy was a common one in Hellenistic art and it is possible that the figurine is a generic representation not connected to any specific historical event.

== Date ==
The Galatians were remnants of the Celts that invaded Greece in 279 BC. They crossed over into Asia Minor in 278, one group allying with Nicomedes I of Bithynia and another being hired as mercenaries by Mithridates I of Pontus. Galatians attacked Ilium in 278–277 and possibly also Cyzicus, being beaten back with the help of the Seleucids or their ally, Pergamon.

The Battle of the Elephants took place shortly after these events. Dates have been proposed from as learly as 278–277 to as late as 269–268 BC. It has often been argued that the battle must have preceded the outbreak of the First Syrian War in 274, which occupied so much of Antiochus I's attention. A date of 275 is commonly accepted. Bezalel Bar-Kochva argued for a date of 273–272, placing the battle in the midst of the Syrian War. His arguments have not been accepted. However, Michael Wörrle's argument for placing the battle after the Syrian War, in the years 270–268, has been widely accepted. He cites an inscription from the summer or autumn of 268 referring to a "Galatian War" in the vicinity of Laodicea on the Lycus.

== Forces ==
According to Lucian, the Galatians came to the battle with 40,000 cavalry, 160 two-horsed chariots and 80 scythed chariots, as well as an infantry phalanx consisting of 24 lines of hoplites, the front line in bronze armour. Although he does not give a total for this force, it corresponds to 150,000–300,000 troops. This size is almost certainly a gross exaggeration. Likewise, it is unlikely that the Galatians possessed or knew how to effectively use scythed chariots by that time or that they yet organized their infantry in phalanxes.

Lucian presents the Seleucid force as much smaller and lighter, consisting mostly of skirmishers, but complemented by sixteen war elephants. This force was assembled hastily and half of it lacked armour. The core, however, was what Lucian calls the "Macedonians", probably the Argyraspides, a heavy infantry guard unit from the capital, Sardis. The Seleucid force may have numbered upwards of 16,000 troops.

== Battle ==
Antiochus' battle plan depended on his elephants. Lucian attributes the decision to the advice of a certain Theodotas of Rhodes. There is reason to suspect that the role of Theodotas is an invention of Lucian and that he had in mind the historical Theodotus of Aetolia, an advisor to Antiochus III.

The battle was opened by a charge of the Galatian chariots. The presence of chariots and elephants indicates that the battle took place on a plain. The elephants were at first held back and out of sight, then deployed against the Galatian cavalry to spook it into trampling its own infantry. The stratagem worked, since the Galatians had never seen elephants before. Most of the Galatian force was either killed or captured. The only information about the battle itself provided by the Suda corroborates Lucian. Antiochus destroyed the Galatian cavalry with his elephants. The few survivors fled to the mountains.

== Aftermath ==
The victorious troops sang a paean to Antiochus and declared him kallinikos ("achiever of a beautiful victory"). He, slightly ashamed at owing his triumph to animals, ordered that the tropaion (trophy) should depict only an elephant without any human figure. After his victory, Antiochus regained control of the cities of Ionia.

According to the Suda, Simonides of Magnesia wrote an epic poemon the "battle against the Galatians when [Antiochus] defeated the cavalry with his elephants". He may have been a contemporary or been active during the reign of Antiochus III. The epic is lost. It has often been supposed that it was Lucian's source, but the evidence for this is slim. It has been suggested that Simonides' epic was merely an encomium, "for the battle against the Galatians (Celts) hardly warranted a whole epic."

Clemens Koehn has argued that Antiochus did not exploit his victory over the Galatians for propaganda purposes. On the other hand, Altay Coşkun has argued that the later accounts of the battle are byproducts of Seleucid propaganda: "two key motifs—the defeat of Galatians and the deployment of war elephants—were combined and employed by the court of Antiochus in its public self-representation." On his view, the Elephant Victory was not an actual battle, but "diplomacy, most probably of a rather costly kind", with the Galatians.

== Bibliography ==
- Bar-Kochva, Bezalel (1973). "On the Sources and Chronology of Antiochus I's Battle against the Galatians". Proceedings of the Cambridge Philological Society. 19 (199): 1–8. JSTOR 44696656.
- Cameron, Alan (1995). Callimachus and His Critics. Princeton University Press.
- Coşkun, Altay (2011). "Galatians and Seleucids: a Century of Conflict and Cooperation". In K. Erickson; G. Ramsey (eds.). Seleucid Dissolution: Fragmentation and Transformation of Empire. Harrassowitz Verlag. pp. 85–106.
- Coşkun, Altay (2012). "Deconstructing a Myth of Seleucid History: The So-Called 'Elephant Victory' Revisited". Phoenix. 66 (1–2): 57–73. doi:10.1353/phx.2012.0022.
- Grainger, John D. (2014). The Rise of the Seleukid Empire (323–223 BC): Seleukos I to Seleukos III. Pen & Sword.
- Nelson, Thomas J. (2022). "Beating the Galatians: Ideologies, Analogies and Allegories in Hellenistic Literature and Art". In A. Coşkun (ed.). Galatian Victories and Other Studies into the Agency and Identity of the Galatians in the Hellenistic and Early Roman Periods. Peeters. pp. 97–144.
- Ray, Fred Eugene (2020). Hellenistic Land Battles, 300–167 BCE: A History and Analysis of 130 Engagements. McFarland.
- Sowa, Wojciech (2017). "Im Schatten des Zwittergottes: Interkulturelle Onomastik aus Kleinasien (Phrygien/Galatien)". In M. Nemeth; B. Podolak; M. Urban (eds.). Essays in the History of Languages and Linguistics: Dedicated to Marek Stachowski on the Occasion of his 60th Birthday. pp. 625–642. doi:10.12797/9788376388618.39.
