= Antigenes (historian) =

Ancient Greek historian

Antigenes was a Greek historian, who probably lived in the late fourth century BC. He seems to have written a historical work about Alexander the Great.

Antigenes—as well as Cleitarchus and Onesicritus—is one of the older historians of Alexander mentioned by Plutarch, who described the allegedly interview of Thalestris, queen of the Amazons, with the Macedonian king as a true fact. He is also mentioned by the ancient grammarian Aelius Herodianus. The work of Antigenes has completely disappeared, but seems to have had a topographical and scientific character. It cannot be ascertained, if he is identical with Antigenes, a general of Alexander.

== Edition of the fragments ==
- Felix Jacoby: Fragmente der griechischen Historiker, no. 141
