= Antigenes =

Antigenes (Ancient Greek: Ἀντιγένης) was the name of a number of people of ancient Greece:

== People ==
- Antigenes (general), a 4th-century BCE general of Alexander the Great
- Antigenes (historian), a Greek historian who spoke of the Amazon's visit to Alexander.
- Antigenes, a Greek grammarian.
- At least three Greek physicians shared this name:
  - Antigenes, an inhabitant of Chios, was mentioned in one of the spurious letters of Euripides, who (if he ever really existed) must have lived in the fifth century BCE.
  - Antigenes, one of the followers of Cleophantus, who must have lived about the middle of the third century BCE, as Mnemon, one of his fellow pupils, is known to have lived in the reign of Ptolemy Euergetes, around 247-222 BCE. One of his works is quoted by Caelius Aurelianus, and he is probably the physician mentioned by Galen, together with several others who lived about that time, as being celebrated anatomists.
  - Antigenes, one of Galen's contemporaries at Rome in the second century CE, who was a pupil of Quintus and Marinus, and had an extensive and lucrative practice. Galen gives an account of their differing in opinion as to the probable result of the illness of the philosopher Eudemus.
