= Aspeisas =

- Satrap of Susiana
- Reign: c. 316–311 BC
- Predecessor: Antigenes
- Successor: Seleucus I Nicator
- Born: Susiana (likely)
- Dynasty: None (native noble)

Aspeisas (Greek: Ἀσπεισᾶς; active circa 316–315 BC) was a Persian or Elamite nobleman who served as satrap of Susiana (modern Khuzestan) under Antigonus I Monophthalmus, one of Alexander the Great's most powerful successors. He is notable as one of the few non-Greek or non-Macedonian individuals to hold a high-level provincial command under one of the Diadochi, and his brief tenure reflects the intense volatility of the Wars of the Successors.

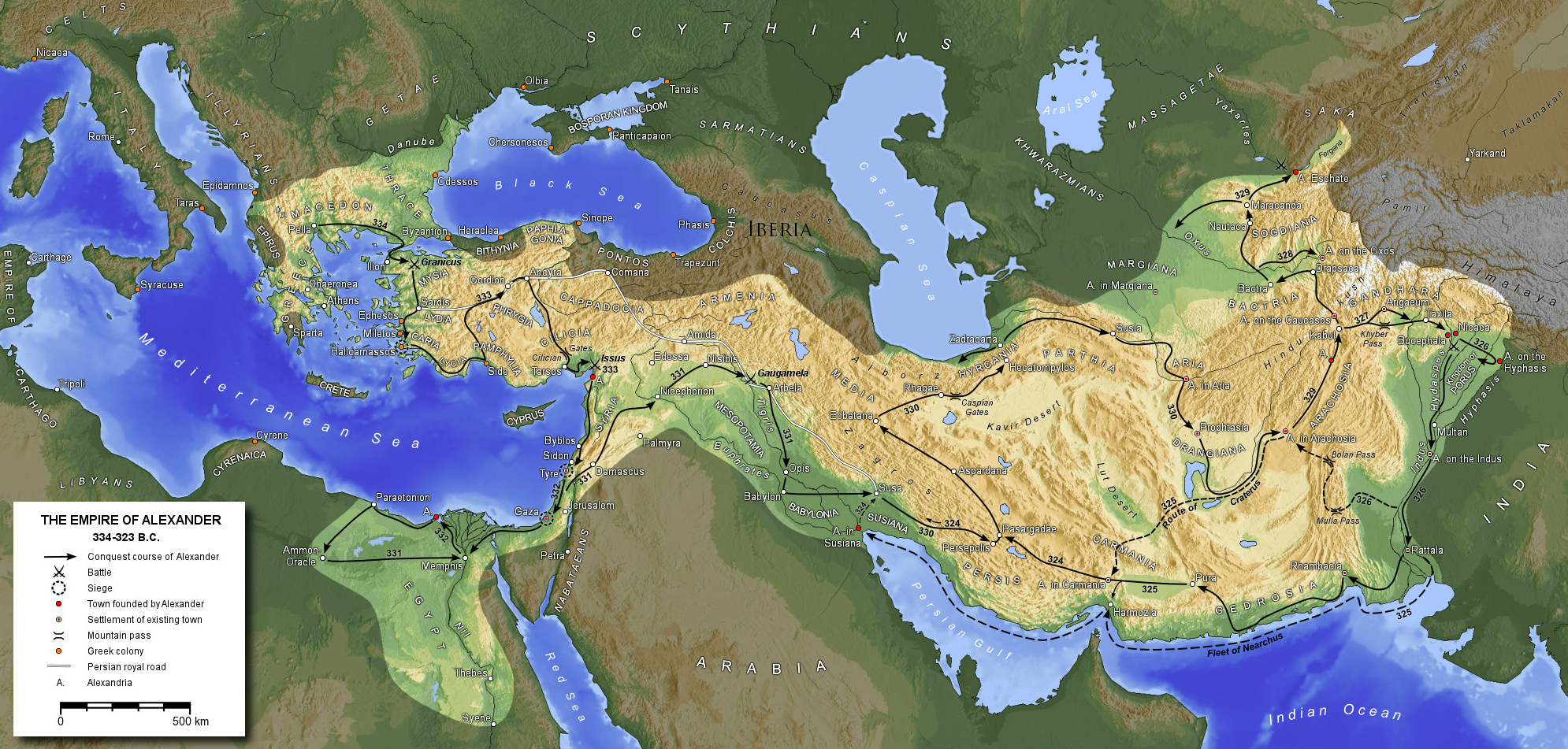
Map of Alexander's empire and his route.

== Background: Antigenes and the Silver Shields ==
Prior to Aspeisas's appointment, Susiana was governed by Antigenes, a Macedonian officer and veteran of Alexander’s campaigns. Antigenes also commanded the elite infantry unit known as the Argyraspides or Silver Shields, renowned for their combat prowess and long service dating back to Philip II. During the Second War of the Diadochi, Antigenes and his Silver Shields sided with Eumenes of Cardia against Antigonus.

Following Antigonus’s victory over Eumenes in 316 BC, Antigenes fell into his hands. In retribution for the severe resistance his forces had faced, particularly from the Silver Shields, Antigonos had Antigenes executed by burning him alive in a pit, a punishment remarkable for its cruelty even by the standards of the age. This execution not only eliminated a key enemy commander but also created a vacancy in the satrapy of Susiana.

== Appointment of Aspeisas ==
Shortly after his victory, while passing through Susa en route to the Mediterranean, Antigonus appointed Aspeisas, a native of Susiana, as the new satrap of the province. This act, recorded by Diodorus Siculus (Bibliotheca historica 19.55.1), also overturned a prior grant of Susiana to Seleucus, who at that time was in exile following his own expulsion from Babylon.

Antigonus’s policy in the East sought to stabilize the region through local appointments. Along with Aspeisas, he installed Euagoras in Ariana/Drangiana, Orontobates in Media, and Asklepiodoros in Persia. Billows notes that both Orontobates and Aspeisas were natives of their respective regions, indicating Antigonus’s desire to conciliate eastern populations and reduce the likelihood of renewed unrest in territories far from Macedonian oversight. He is identified with the name ΑΣΠΕΙΣΟΥ (Aspeisou) found on posthumous Alexandrine coins struck at Susa.

After his appointment in 316 BC, Aspeisas is not mentioned again in surviving sources. Following Seleucus’s return to power in Babylonia in 311 BC and his subsequent reconquest of the eastern satrapies, it is unlikely that Aspeisas retained his office. His ultimate fate remains unknown.
