= Callisthenes =

Greek historian (c. 360–327 BCE)

Callisthenes of Olynthus (/kəˈlɪsθəˌniːz/; Greek: Καλλισθένης; c. 360 – c. 327 BCE) was a Greek historian in Macedon with connections to both Aristotle and Alexander the Great. He accompanied Alexander the Great during his Asiatic expedition and served as his historian and publicist. He later opposed Alexander’s adoption of Persian culture and was arrested after being implicated in a plot on the king's life; he died in prison. During his life, he authored several works on Greek history and a biography of Alexander the Great.

== Early life ==
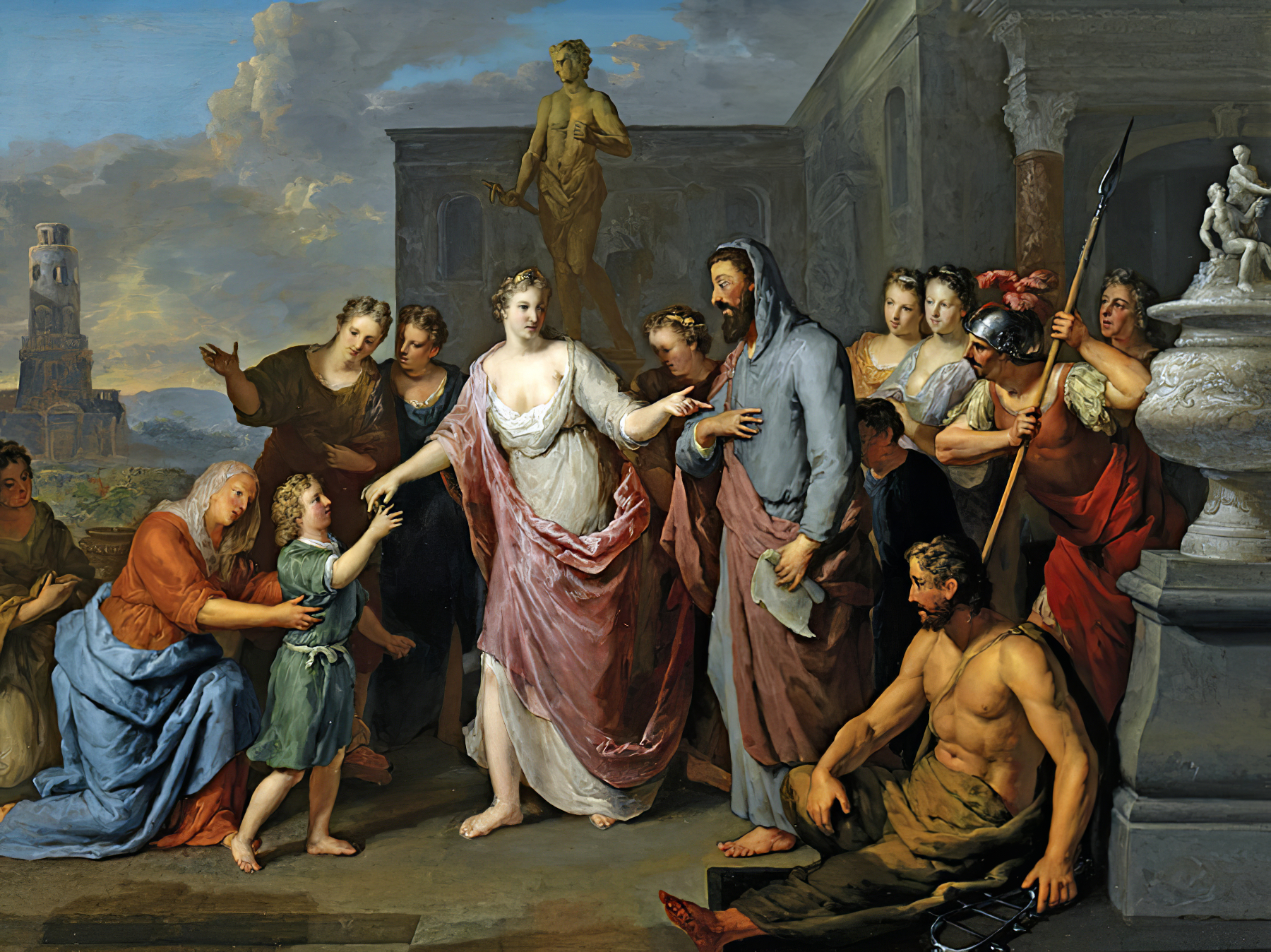
Olympias presenting the young Alexander the Great to Aristotle by Gerard Hoet, before 1733

Callisthenes was born in Olynthus sometime during 360 BCE. Little is known of his early childhood except that his mother Hero was the niece of Aristotle, and daughter of Proxenus of Atarneus and Arimneste; which made Callisthenes the great-nephew of Aristotle by his sister Arimneste, Callisthenes's grandmother. It is also known that Callisthenes was in the care of Aristotle by 347 BCE and studied under him as his student. Callisthenes spent much of his early life writing and traveling with Aristotle. His first literary work was an encomium to Hermias of Atarneus, but by 334 BC, he had written a few works including a series on Greek history and antiquarian writings, such as a registry of competitors for the Pythian Games for which Aristotle and Callisthenes are thanked. Based on the fact that a reference by Diodorus Siculus mentions Callisthenes’ historical accounts of Greek history, it can be assumed that Callisthenes was a historian of some repute before he began working with Alexander the Great. Callisthenes first met Alexander when Alexander began being tutored by Aristotle around the age of thirteen. Aristotle had been tasked by Philip II of Macedon to tutor the young Alexander in Mytilene. While both studying under Aristotle, Callisthenes and Alexander would have come to know each other as fellow students and pupils of Aristotle.

== Campaign with Alexander the Great ==
Around 334 BCE, Callisthenes was invited to accompany Alexander the Great in his Asiatic expedition. There were many factors as to why Callisthenes chose to accompany Alexander. First, being that he had already established a relationship with Alexander during their time as students of Aristotle and as a historian and antiquarian, he might have appreciated a chance at traveling. Another potential reason is that Callisthenes’ birthplace of Olynthus was destroyed by Phillip II of Macedon, and he might have been looking to better himself in the eyes of Alexander and thus Phillip II’s court, in order to aid in its reconstruction.

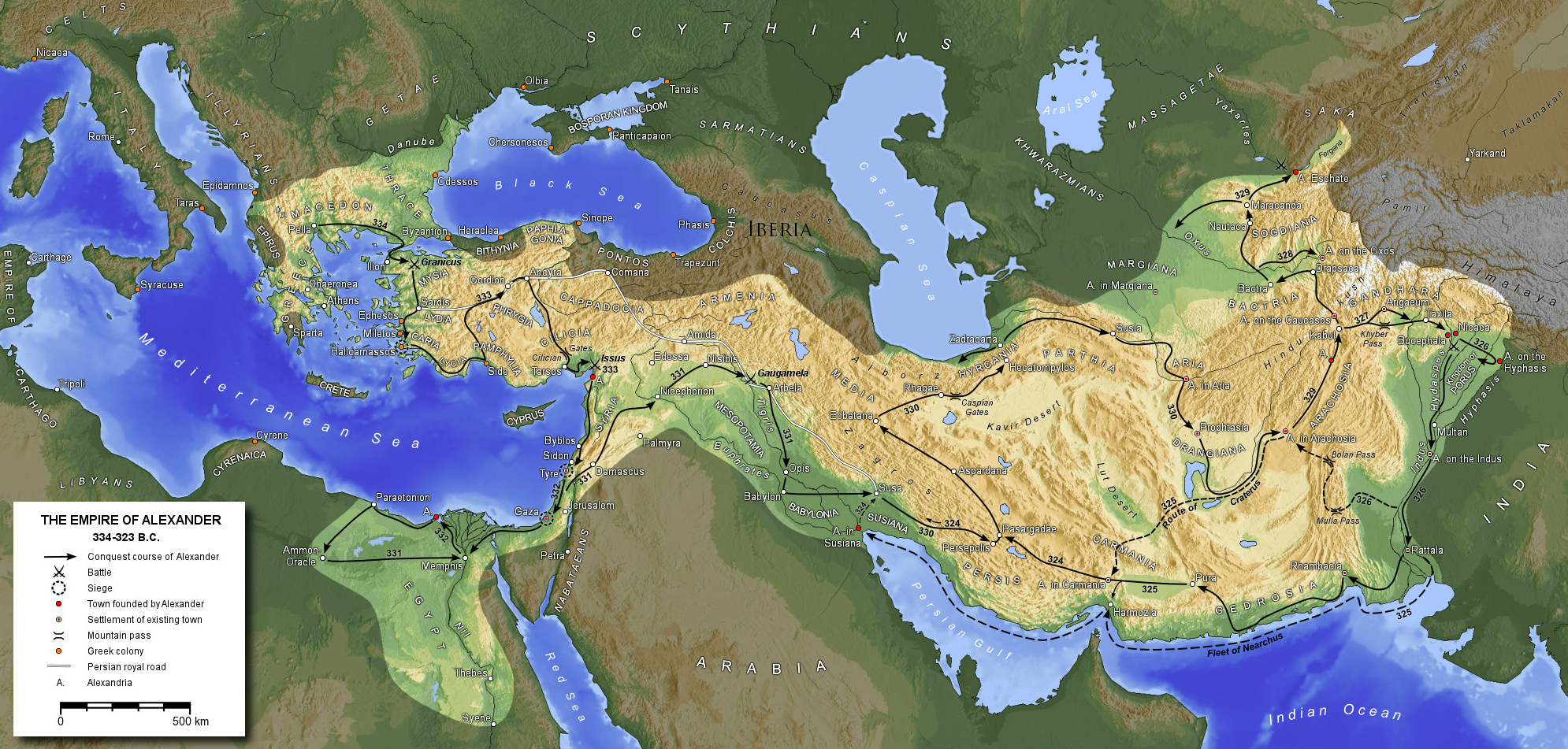
A map of Alexander the Great's empire at its largest extent c.323 BCE including details of key roads, location, and battles.

During this expedition, Callisthenes was tasked with being the official historian for the campaign. While he occupied this role, he compiled his narrative on the events that transpired during the campaign. Much of the work is dedicated to praising Alexander and upholding his authority as the king as his army penetrated further into Asia. While much of his time during the campaign was spent working on his account of the expedition, Callisthenes was also sent on scientific expeditions, to places such as Kush or Babylon. Callisthenes had an affinity for the natural sciences and is known to have written several scientific works, including astronomical diaries and his own theories for the source of the Nile River, although these theories later received pushback from Alexander.

== Opposition to Alexander the Great ==
The dramatic conflict between Alexander the Great and Callisthenes was a result of years of tensions between many of Alexander’s court members, including Callisthenes that came to a head. Throughout Alexander’s campaign, he acquired an interest in taking on Persian customs and aristocrats. By 328 BCE, Alexander had allowed a handful of Persian aristocrats to join his entourage, a choice that deeply upset the Macedonians who were close to Alexander. That same year a confrontation occurred between Alexander and Cleitus the Black, an officer in Alexander’s army. During a banquet Cleitus expressed his displeasure at the current state of Alexander’s contingent. An argument broke out between the two, ending in a physical confrontation and Cleitus’ demise at Alexander’s hand. After this conflict Alexander was distraught and brought on his trusted friends, one of which was Callisthenes, to provide counsel.

By the next year Alexander’s fascination with Persian culture had only grown and in 327 BCE, he attempted to introduce the Persian servile ceremony of proskynesis. Callisthenes was sharply critical of Alexander’s new Persian practices. During a banquet held shortly before Alexander’s expedition left for India, Callisthenes gave a speech arguing against the adoption of proskynesis. Callisthenes argued that Alexander was not entitled to receive divine honors, such as the proskynesis from his followers. Alexander witnessed this speech and knowing Callisthenes was correct chose not to continue with the practice.

Another account by Plutarch claims that during this banquet Alexander offered a cup to a colleague who performed the proskynesis ceremony, kissed Alexander, and then drank from the cup. While all of the other members of the court performed the ceremony, Callisthenes blatantly refused to act out the proskynesis. This direct opposition to Alexander won Callisthenes favor with the Macedonians but destroyed the relationship between Callisthenes and Alexander. Callisthenes eventually left the king’s court as he had lost favor with Alexander. After Callisthenes' fall from grace, he became increasingly politically isolated from the remaining members of Alexander’s court. Alexander continued to introduce more Persian recruits, further displeasing the remaining Macedonians in his court.

== Death ==
In an incident during a royal boar hunt in which Hermolaus of Macedon, one of Alexander’s royal pages and Callisthenes' former pupil, broke royal protocol and assisted Alexander in killing the boar. For this Hermolaus was publicly humiliated by flogging as well as the removing of his horse. This led Hermolaus and several other royal pages to create a conspiracy to assassinate Alexander. Yet, the conspiracy was discovered, and the young nobles faced arrest, torture and interrogation.

While under torture, Hermolaus implicated Callisthenes as a part of the plot against Alexander. Because of Callisthenes’ previous opposition to Alexander, as well as his previous role as Hermolaus’s instructor, Alexander found Callisthenes guilty of treason and ordered his subsequent arrest. Callisthenes was subsequently thrown into prison where he died seven months later. There are several different accounts of how he died or was executed. Crucifixion is the method suggested by Ptolemy, but Chares of Mytilene and Aristobulus of Cassandreia both claim that Callisthenes died of natural causes while in prison.

Callisthenes' death was commemorated in a special treatise (Callisthenes or a Treatise on Grief) by his friend Theophrastus, whose acquaintance he made during a visit to Athens. In this eulogy Theophrastus condemns Alexander for the torture and execution of Callisthenes. He also references the acts of mourning and grief enacted by those who were close to Callisthenes and advises the bereaved on how to cope with the loss. Theophrastus also upholds Callisthenes as a figure of traditional piety and civic freedom.

== Writings ==
Callisthenes' best-known work was an account of Alexander's expedition up to the time of Callisthenes’ own execution. Deeds of Alexander or Praxeis Alexandrou (330 BCE) was a biographical-style series of works detailing the campaigns of Alexander the Great. Although copies of the work do not survive today, some knowledge of it can be inferred from references by other authors. The book was intended as propaganda and glorified Alexander’s military achievements and claims to divinity as the son of Zeus. According to Polybius, much of Callisthenes' military accounts were over-glorified to the point of impossibility. Polybius claims that Callisthenes’ descriptions of Alexander’s military are impossible and would not fit in the locations, such as the country outside of Cilicia, that Callisthenes describes. It contained many references to Homer’s Iliad and also described locations in the Iliad that Alexander had visited. It applauded Alexander as a standard for Greek masculinity; and condemned the Persians as weak and effeminate. It is said to have been used as justification for the Panhellenic crusade and as a means of recruiting potential supporters for Alexander’s crusade.

In addition to his work on Alexander the Great, he also authored another major work, a 10 book historical anthology of Greece. Hellenica covered the periods from the Peace of Antalcidas (387 BCE) to the start of the Phocian war (357 BCE). His other works include: the list of winners from the Pythian games that he co-authored with Aristotle, writings on astronomy including a description of the Great Comet of 371 BC, a work covering the first Sacred war of 600 BCE titled On the Sacred War, a tribute Hermias to Atarneaus and Assos who were killed by Persians, a book on witty sayings, a Diakosmos Battle Order which covers ships in Homers Iliad, and a Periplus covering the Black Sea.

=== Pseudo-Callisthenes ===
Additionally, many works have been ascribed to Callisthenes mistakenly, resulting in their authorship commonly being known as Pseudo-Callisthenes. One of the more well-known examples is the Alexander Romance, the basis of all the Alexander legends of the Middle Ages. It originated during the time of the Ptolemies, but in its present form belongs to the 3rd century CE. The work has also been said to be authored by several other people besides Callisthenes, including: Aesopus, Aristotle, Antisthenes, Onesicritus, and Arrian. The Latin translation for the text is usually attributed to Julius Valerius Alexander Polemius (early 4th century). There are also Syrian, Armenian, and Slavonic versions, in addition to four Greek versions (two in prose and two in verse) in the Middle Ages (see Krumbacher, Geschichte der byzantinischen Literatur, 1897, p. 849). Valerius's translation was completely superseded by that of Leo, archpriest of Naples in the 10th century, the so-called Historia de Preliis.

In addition to the Alexander Romance, Pseudo-Callisthenes is also credited with several other works, including a work titled Metamorphoses, a work on Macedonian history, a History of Thrace, and a treatise on the subject of hunting. There has also been a collection of letters, written in Greek, originally attributed to Callisthenes, yet later disputed as the dates of the letters range far beyond the time period that Callisthenes was alive. Many of these were originally attributed to Callisthenes due to their assumed time period aligning with Callisthenes’s active years as an author, as well as their subject matter being on topics Callisthenes was known to have written about. As of now, there are no intact copies of Callisthenes’s works known to have survived.
