= History of Alexander =

Lost work on Alexander the Great by Cleitarchus

The History of Alexander, also known as Perì Aléxandron historíai, is a lost work by the late-fourth century BC Hellenistic historian Cleitarchus, covering the life and death of Alexander the Great. It survives today in around thirty fragments and is commonly known as The Vulgate, with the works based on it known as The Vulgate Tradition. These works consist primarily of that of Diodorus, the Bibliotheca historica, and Quintus Curtius Rufus, with his Historiae Alexandri Magni.

Completed at some point between 309 and 301 BC, it was the most popular work depicting Alexander in its time, but is valuable today for its unique perspective on the conqueror, in particular his psychological disposition and specifics of how the soldiers under him lived. It is considered an unreliable source, with modern scholars considering Cleitarchus to have been more dedicated to writing an entertaining story than a reliable historical account. This dedication was also challenged by ancient historians such as Arrian, who wrote his The Anabasis of Alexander in what is believed to be a deliberate attempt to counter Cleitarchus' "Vulgate Tradition", and in doing so created a work regarded by modern scholars as the best source on Alexander.

== Origin ==
The work is believed to have been written in Alexandria, perhaps having been started when Ptolemy ordered the body of Alexander brought to Egypt, and finished between 309 and 301 BC. This dating is backed by the writings of several ancient historians, in particular through the works of the same Ptolemy, who it appears corrected Cleitarchus and whose works have been dated to the late fourth century, but this has been disputed in recent years following research into the Oxyrhynchus Papyri (P. Oxy. LXXI 4808), which suggests that he instead lived and wrote in the mid-third century BC. This source states that Cleitarchus was a tutor to the king Ptolemy IV Philopator (who was born in the latter half of the 4th century) for a few years before he died. Therefore he couldn't have been able to publish the History of Alexander at the originally accepted time of publication between 309 and 301 BC.

== Vulgate Tradition ==
For much of antiquity Cleitarchus' work was the main secondary source that scholars wishing to create works about the Alexandrian Period utilized, resulting in a body of works described as in the Vulgate Tradition, with the work itself being referred to as The Vulgate. These notably include the works of Diodorus in his Bibliotheca historica, and Quintus Curtius Rufus with his Historiae Alexandri Magni, but also Sisenna and Justin (historian), alongside numerous less notable or otherwise forgotten figures.

The Vulgate Tradition itself is that of the popular narrative, typically critical of Alexander, in juxtaposition to the narratives presented in less critical accounts, such as those of Arrian. It has been criticized along with the History itself for dramatizing Alexander, focusing on the lurid details and negative aspects. Conversely, it has been commended for not whitewashing Alexander's life, and including these negative details that other historians have omitted.

== Synopsis ==
The History of Alexander is divided into thirteen books with Book One starting with Alexander's birth and Book Thirteen ending with Alexander's death.

=== Book One (336BC-335BC) ===
Alexander was born in 356 and was able to claim ancestry to Heracles through his father whilst claiming Aecid ancestry from his mother. Following the assassination of his father Philip in 336, he assumes control of the Macedonian kingdom and consolidates his power whilst other Greek city-states tried to usurp his position. This is achieved through diplomacy, gifts, and warfare. Following his uniting of the city-states, Alexander begins campaigning in Thrace, but has to turn back around when a number of city-states, particularly Thebes, rebel in his absence. He besieges the Theban fort, the Cadmeia, and after three days, Alexander attacks the fort. The battle results in a Theban defeat, and their city is looted, razed, and has the citizens sold into slavery.

=== Book Two (335BC-334BC) ===
Alexander convenes a council of his closest advisors (known as the Friends) to organize his campaign into Asia and hosts nine days of festivals to placate Greek officials and bolster morale in his armies before he departs. Once the celebrations are over and Alexander is prepared, he sails his army to Anatolia, lands in Troad, and disembarks his army. Darius, king of the Persian Empire, meets with his council to formulate a plan in order to deal with Alexander's landing. Memnon of Rhodes suggests that the Persians fight asymmetrically and destroy anything of use to Alexander as he moves inland, but the other members of the council agree to face Alexander's army head-on. The Battle of Granicus is the result of this decision. The Persian army massively outnumbers Alexander's forces, but is quickly routed when the Satrap of Ionia, Spithridates, alongside other Persian nobility, die fighting Alexander. For his leadership and personal accomplishments against the Persians that day, Alexander received laurels. The Persians lost ten thousand men in battle and another twenty-two thousand were taken into captivity.

With the Persian army retreating, Alexander takes the opportunity to push further inland. He enters Lydia and occupies Sardis when its Satrap, Mithrenes, surrenders the city and its treasury to him. During this time, Memnon and the Persian forces that retreated from the Battle of Granicus regrouped at Miletus. Alexander besieges the city from the land and sea. Eventually, his army collapses the walls of the city and forces the city to surrender. Following this battle, Alexander dismissed the majority of his navy. Memnon managed to escape the siege with some of his troops, and then establishes himself and his army in the Carian city of Halicarnassus. During this time, Memnon sends his wife Barsine and his children to live with Darius. This is done in order to both ensure their safety and to serve as hostages so Memnon can maintain his position as supreme commander of the Persian forces in the region. Alexander eventually reaches Halicarnassus, occupying and winning the support of multiple cities and the support of the Carian nobility before reaching the city. He besieges the city, but after a number of skirmishes, the Persians under Memnon retreat to the island of Kos. Out of irritation, Alexander razes the lower part of the city.

=== Book Three (334BC-333BC) ===
Memnon receives funding, troops, and three hundred ships from Darius. He uses these forces to capture many Greek islands. No major resistance can be mustered against his campaign and he reaches as far as the island of Euboea until he contracts and dies from an illness, leaving the Persian army without a commander. Alexander has the Lyncestian Alexander arrested under the suspicion that he was planning a rebellion against him in Macedonia. Some time after issuing this order, he reaches and occupies the city of Gordion, which has a knot that may determine who would control Asia. Instead of unravelling the knot, he cuts it apart with his sword to fulfill the prophecy. Following this, Alexander marches into Cappadocia with his army. Whilst this is happening, Darius debates with his council on who would next lead the Persian army, whether that be himself, or someone else chosen by his council. Charidemus the Athenian advocates that he should lead the army, but ends up being executed after he goes into a tirade on the council and Darius. Darius is then appointed as the commander of the army, which consists of 400,000 infantrymen including his Immortals and 1000,000 cavalry. and marches to the Euphrates River.

Upon receiving the news of Darius marching, Alexander marches his army to meet his. He attempts to wade across the Cydnus River in Tarsus, but the water is freezing cold and he falls ill and the army is forced to encamp whilst Alexander is nursed back to better health by Philip the Physician. However, Parmenion, a lieutenant close to Alexander, casts suspicion on Philip's loyalty to Alexander, implying that he might try to kill instead of heal him. Alexander insists that Philip works to heal him and he succeeds, whereupon he is admitted into Alexander's council of Friends.

=== Book Four (333BC-332BC) ===
Alexander occupies Issus and establishes his camp in anticipation of a battle with Darius. During the wait, his army receives a letter from Darius imploring that one of his Persian men by the name of Sisines betray Alexander. After a period of waiting where Sisines did not proclaim his loyalty to him, Alexander has him executed. During this time, Darius is getting closer to Issus, and leaves his supply train and non-combatants in Damascus. He proceeds to Cilicia to fight Alexander, who begins to withdraw to a better position to fight the numerically superior Persian army. Not all of his men can keep up during the retreat, and some of Alexander's men are captured and interrogated. They reveal where Alexander established his camp, which was on an open plain. Alexander marches his army to meet Darius. The two armies meet and begin the Battle of Issus after Darius and Alexander arrange their forces and deliver speeches. At the beginning of the battle, Alexander took his personal cavalry and the rest of his best cavalry forces to personally fight Darius. He is quickly tied down in melee and his chariot is disabled. He forced to retreat on horseback before he is killed, causing his army to route. During the route, the Persian supply train and Darius' family is captured. The battle is a resounding defeat for the Persians, with 110,000 Persians dead compared to Alexander's 4,500 dead. Alexander treats Darius' family with respect during their capture, going as far as to pay the women expensive dowries to placate them. As Alexander's army regroups, Darius reaches Babylon and begins to both correspond with Alexander in an attempt to purchase back his family and rally his army.

Similarly to the aftermath of the Battle of the Granicus, Alexander makes greater territorial gains following the Persian defeat. In the aftermath, Alexander enters Phoenicia and appoints Hephaistion as the ruler of Sidon. After this, he rapidly takes over Syria, save for the island city of Tyre, which stubbornly holds out against Alexander's army in a siege. Because Alexander dismissed the majority of his navy, he couldn't sail his army to the island. Instead he is forced to build a land bridge, but this is contested and stalled by the Tyrians and their naval power as well as bad weather. As the siege dragged on, Alexander deliberates lifting the siege due to the time and resources it has taken, but he decides it would be too big of a blow to his reputation to give up. Instead, he has new boats and siege engines built, and personally leads the charge into breaches made in the walls of Tyre. Out of irritation, Alexander crucifies 2,000 Tyrians and sells the remaining citizens into slavery.

=== Book Five (332BC-331BC) ===
This book starts with events that occurred outside of Alexander's campaigns. Agis III, the king of Sparta, recruits an army of 8,000 soldiers that were formerly in Alexander's army at the Battle of Issus to try disrupting the rule of Antipater in Macedonia and capture the island of Crete. Amyntas, a deserter from Alexander's army, steals the Satrapy of Egypt, but his reign is short lived as he dies fighting a battle alongside his forces outside of Memphis. After these events, the book refocuses on Alexander's campaigns against the Persians. Alexander lands his troops near Gaza, whilst Darius is focused on reinforcing his army, who petitions the Satrap of Bactria, Bessus, for new troops. Alexander encircles Gaza and besieges the city. After two months, the city surrenders after 10,000 Arabs and Persians are killed. Alexander heads into Egypt, which peacefully accepts Alexander's rule over Persian authority. Being led by a flock of crows, he marches to the Temple of Zeus-Ammon with his army. Upon reaching the temple, he consults with the oracle to confirm if he had killed those who assassinated his father. When it is confirmed he had killed his father's assassins, he leaves the temple for Memphis and Ethiopia, leaving expensive gifts for the temple. To ensure the safety of Egypt and the movements of his army, he appoints Aeschylus of Rhodes and Peucestes of Macedon alongside 4,000 troops to garrison the territory and assigns Apollonius and 30 triremes to defend the coast of Libya. Before leaving Egypt for Syria, Alexander has the city of Alexandria founded.

As Alexander is heading for Syria, Darius has finished preparing his army. Whilst it is only half the size of the massive Persian army at the Battle of Issus and he can't supply weapons to all of his men, he acquired 200 chariots to supplement his forces. With an army of half a million men, Darius left Babylon and marched his army between the Tigris and Euphrates rivers, planning to fight Alexander at Nineveh. He sets up his camp at Arbela, ordering the general Mazaeus to defend the Tigris River in case Alexander attempts to cross it. However, Mazaeus believes that no army can cross the river because of its rapid currents. Leaving the Tigris open, Alexander crosses it in an extremely risky maneuver, but the Persian army was not in a position to notice or contest the crossing. After the crossing, Stateira, the wife of Darius, falls ill and dies. Alexander gives her a Persian burial whilst a soldier by the name of Tyriotes from Alexander's army delivers the news to Darius. Whilst not believing him at first and even threatening Tyriotes with torture, Darius succumbs to grief. He sends ten emissaries to Alexander's camp to try arranging a peace deal that can return his family and save his empire. Alexander refuses any peace deal that does not involve Darius ceding his empire to him, resulting in the two parties agreeing to fighting a battle to determine who would rule the two empires, resulting in the Battle of Gaugamela.

Initially, Parmenion suggests that Alexander attacks the Persian army at night, but he refuses the idea out of honor and feasibility. Alexander is also made aware that the Persians had been preparing the battlefield, constructing traps for Alexander's cavalry. The night before the battle, Alexander is notably very nervous and unsure of the outcome of the battle, preventing him from sleeping for most of the night and waking up just before the battle. The battle begins with a focus on what the Persian chariots and the cavalry under Mazaeus do, with frequent changes between the actions of the two units. The Persian chariots initially inflicted heavy casualties on Alexander's army. However, the chariots also suffer heavy casualties as Alexander's army had prepared strategies to fight the Persian chariots and cavalry formations. Mazaeus and the Bactrians attack Alexander's supply caravan to loot and free captives to equip them for the ongoing battle. Parmenion rallies forces to fight Mazaeus and the Bactrians whilst Alexander fights the Persian wing under Darius. Similarly to previous battles, Darius' chariot comes under attack by Alexander's forces. In the melee, Darius' chariot driver is impaled by a spear, and in the chaos the Persians retreat thinking that Darius has been killed, leaving Mazaeus exposed. Not initially knowing that Parmenion was strained under thee attack from Mazaeus, Alexander chases Darius to try preventing his escape, but he is forced to turn back around to attack Parmenion. Darius retreats toward Arbela over the Lycus River with his forces whilst Mazaeus crosses the Tigris River and disperses his forces across various villages in the Greek-held territory. Cleitarchus estimated that 90,000 Persians died compared to a mere 500 Greeks, although many more were wounded.

In the aftermath of the battle and upon hearing of his successes, Spartan, Thracian, and other Greek city-states rebel against Alexander. Antipater manages to recruit an army of 40,000 men to crush the rebellions, ending with a final battle against Agis III where he is slain, ending in a Spartan defeat with fifty hostages being taken from the battle.

=== Book Six (331BC-330BC) ===
Darius reaches Arbela after leaving his supply train behind in order to distract Alexander's troops, who begin to loot it. However, Alexander abandons looting the supply train after a short time after concerns are raised that the army will soon contract diseases from the corpses leftover from the Battle of Gaugamela. Alexander marches his troops on Babylon, and the Persian general Mazaeus, who is also the Satrap of Babylon, surrenders the city to him. A celebration is thrown for Alexander when he arrives, and his army stays in the city for 34 days. The nature of the city is described, from the founding of the city by Semiramis, the people, the celebrations Alexander's army partook in, and to the Hanging Gardens. Alexander assigns a number of Greek officials and troops to defend the city, but chooses to keep Mazaeus as the Satrap for his co-operation with Alexander. Before he leaves Babylon, Alexander is reinforced with 10,000 new troops brought back from Greece by Amyntas. Alexander then marches into the region of Sittacene, taking advantage of the resources in the region to facilitate the reorganization of his army into 1,000-man units led by Chiliarchs to improve its efficiency. By the time Alexander reorganizes his army, it had marched into the region Susiane. Abulites, the Satrap of Susiane surrenders the city of Susa to Alexander, as well as its treasury. Alexander leaves the city after looting the treasury, but leaves Darius' family behind so they can pursue an education.

Alexander reaches another point along the Tigris River, specifically the Pasitigris, and into the region of Uxii. Madates, Satrap of Uxii, is also a cousin of Darius and refuses to surrender the territory to Alexander. A siege against the Satrap ensues, but he is defeated by a force of 1,500 men under Tauron, and the Uxiane territories are incorporated into the Satrapy of Susa. After this, Alexander marches on Persepolis, but has to cross through the Gates of Susiane to reach the city. He splits his army between himself and Parmenion. Alexander takes his men through the gates where they are ambushed by Persian soldiers, beginning the Battle of the Persian Gate. Alexander's forces take heavy losses, and for the first time in his campaign he is forced to retreat from a battle. After deliberating on how to engage the Persians in the mountain pass, Alexander is approached by a Lycian who offers to show his forces a way to outflank and engage the Persians on the pass. Remembering a prophecy given to him in his childhood by a Delphic Oracle, he accepts the advice of the Lycian. Taking a small force into the mountain pass, Alexander follows the Lycian, and after a few days he flanks the Persians, taking them by surprise and defeating them. Alexander's forces proceed through the mountain pass toward Persepolis. The governor of the city, Tiridates, surrenders the city and its treasury to Alexander. However, before Alexander can enter the city, he has to cross the Araxes River. To do so, he plunders the towns around Persepolis for wood to make a bridge. After his army crosses the river, Alexander enters Persepolis, whereupon his troops celebrate, ransack the city, and fight each other for loot. Alexander loots so much gold and silver that he can't carry it all with his troops, prompting him to send most of it back to Susiane whilst he holds onto enough to further fund his campaign. After the looting ends, Alexander burns down the entirety of the city and kills its citizens. He then begins to search for Darius in order to battle his army of 30,000 men. However, before he can fight a final battle against Darius, he is mortally wounded in a betrayal by the Persians Bessus and Nabarzanes. A Greek soldier finds him dying in a wagon impaled by many javelins, whereupon he pledges that he surrenders his empire to Alexander. When Alexander hears the news, he has Darius' body sent to his family so he can be given a proper funeral.

== Reception ==
=== Contemporary ===
While the History was a popular work in its day, it was challenged several times for its overly fanciful depiction of the life of Alexander, with Roman educator Quintilian describing him as an author with "more ability than trustworthiness", while the orator Cicero claimed that Cleitarchus' depiction of the death of Themistocles was entirely fictional, and in the Oxyrhynchus Papyri he is accused of being overly sensational in his work. Arrian, meanwhile, went so far as to create his own authoritative history on Alexander, in what is believed to be an attempt to challenge the Vulgate Tradition.

Despite this criticism, the work was used by other contemporary historians in the creation of their own work, including Diodorus and Curtius, but also Justin in his Historia Philippicae et Totius Mundi Origines et Terrae Situs, through the intermediator of Pompeius Trogus, and Plutarch, in his Life of Alexander.

=== Modern ===
Modern scholars tend to view the History with considerable distrust, preferring the work of Arrian, but the work of Cleitarchus is appreciated for its unique insights into certain aspects of the life of common soldiers and civilians under Alexander, as well as for a critical view that is lacking in other sources.

== See also ==
- Armenian Alexander Romance
- Iskandarnameh (Nizami)
- Syriac Alexander Legend
