= Itinerarium Alexandri =

4th century work on Alexander the Great

The Itinerarium Alexandri ("The Journey of Alexander") is a 4th-century Latin itinerarium, a travel guide in the form of a listing of cities, villages (vici) and other stops, on a journey with the distances between them noted.

The text describes Alexander the Great's journey of conquest to the Empire of the Persian. The book contains a description of Alexander's life from his ascendance to the Macedonian throne to his conquests in India. The content of the texts draws heavily on the Anabasis of Alexander by Arrian and it has similarities to the Alexander Romance.

The work is dedicated to the Roman Emperor Constantius II. The author is unknown but it is suspected to have been composed in 340 by Julius Valerius, who wrote the Res gestae Alexandri Macedonis.

== Bibliography ==
- Heckel, Waldemar, John Yardley, Alexander the Great: Historical Texts in Translation, Blackwell Publishing, 2004, ISBN 0-631-22821-7, p. xxvi. xxvi.
- Iolo Davies: Alexander's itinerary (itinerary of Alexandria). An English translation. In: Ancient History Bulletin 12, 1998, p. 29-54.
- Raffaella Tabacco: Itinerarium Alexandri. Testo, apparato Critico, introduzione traduzione, e commento. Turin 2000th
- Raffaella Tabacco: Itinerarium Alexandri. Critical review of studies and research perspectives, in "Bulletin of Latin Studies" XVII, 1987, pp. 77–120
- Michael H. Dodgeon: The Roman eastern frontier and the Persian wars: AD 226 - 363, Volume 1 Page 385
