= Alexandre de Paris =

Alexandre de Paris may refer to:

- Alexander of Paris, 12th-century French poet
- Louis Alexandre Raimon (1922–2008), French hairdresser
