= Epitome of the Philippic History of Pompeius Trogus =

Summary by Roman writer Justin of Pompeius Trogus' work Historiæ Phillippicæ

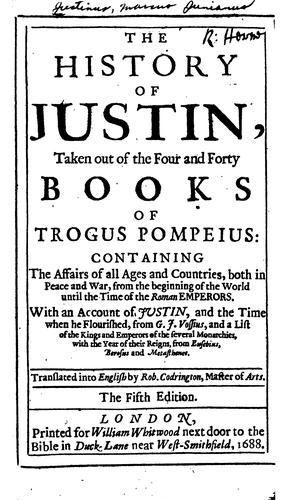
- Title page of a 1688 edition
- Date: Late 2nd or early 3rd century AD, probably prior to 226 (disputed)
- Place of origin: Rome
- Language(s): Latin, Late Latin
- Author: Justin
- Format: 44 brief books and a preface
- Contents: Epitome of the Historia Philippicae

The Epitome of the Philippic History of Pompeius Trogus (Latin Epitoma Historiarum Philippicarum Pompei Trogi) by the second-century Roman writer Justin is an abridgment of the Augustan historian Pompeius Trogus' lengthy work the Historiae Philippicae, which has not survived. Justin's epitome and the shorter Prologi that accompany it are the only surviving sources for Trogus' original work.

The principal work was intended to cover human history from the beginning until the time of the Caesars, focused on Greece and her rulers, nations and peoples, and it was from this base that Justin created his Epitome, slimming it down by focusing on "whatever [parts] was most worthy of being known" and removing parts which "were neither attractive for the pleasure of reading, nor necessary by way of example", resulting in a work approximately one-sixth the length of the original and described as a "capricious anthology" rather than a regular epitome.

Despite its altered nature, the work stands as an important piece of history, both as a connection to the sole pre-Christian work of world history written in Latin and as one of the few written sources into several notable Hellenistic figures.

== Origin ==
With virtually nothing known about the author the origin of the work is much disputed. It is believed to have been written in Rome due to a section in the preface where Justin writes that he had composed the work "during the leisure that I enjoyed in the city".

Dating the work, however, is much harder. The commonly attributed date is that of the late 2nd century or early 3rd century AD, with the work having been written no later than 226/227, as after this date the rise of the Sassanian Empire would have made the last chapter on the Parthians obsolete. Some scholars instead date the work to the 4th century, based on linguistic analysis, and argue that partially obsolete information might not have deterred a non-historian from writing an epitome.

== Composition ==
The composition of the work is complicated due to its epitomized nature, with some elements coming from Trogus and the rest from Justin, and determining whom a particular element belongs to is difficult due to the loss of the principal text or texts.

This complexity leads to issues when determining who influenced the work of Justin, as it can often be difficult to tell whether connections between the Epitome and earlier works are due to Justin being influenced by those works, or by those works being influenced by Trogus.

=== Language ===
The work is written in a blend of Latin and Late Latin, with the Latin being generally attributed to elements that Justin transcribed more directly from Trogus, and with the Late Latin occurring in sections that were more original.

=== Influence of Tacitus ===
Analysis of the Epitome has led scholars to see a connection, through the similarity of metre and content within selected sections, between the work of Justin and that of the earlier Tacitus. This connection has been used as proof that Tacitus was a major influence on the work of Justin, but recent scholarship has disputed this assumption, and instead arguments have been presented attempting to show that Tacitus was influenced by Trogus, in style and through the use of Trogus' work as a historical reference, and this influence was what caused the connection between the works.

=== Vulgate Tradition ===
The books focusing on Alexander are written in the Vulgate Tradition, and sourced through Trogus from the lost History of Alexander by Cleitarchus and as such are considered inaccurate due to Cleitarchus' focus on entertainment over accuracy, compounded by Justin's own focus on the same.

== Structure and theme ==
The Epitome is structured in the same manner as the principal, split into forty-four different books, with the addition of a preface. Each of these books focus on an aspect of world and Grecian history, with specific focus on Alexander the Great, his rise to power and the events transpiring after his death.

The principal's theme was that of imperium, the right of the monarch to rule, with Trogus' tracing the passage from one king to another, from one empire to another, and presenting kings as being essential for the well-being of the state, while Justin focused his work on the theme of moral learning. This was a common theme at the time, and a statement expounding that the work was to focus on such is often found in historical prefaces, as it is in this work.

In order to meet this theme Justin takes the expansive accounts of Trogus and modifies them, but in doing so has made himself an unreliable tertiary source on the depicted events, and the "poorest representative" of the now-lost secondary sources of the events. Despite this alteration and the inclusion of Justin's own theme, much of Trogus' focus did filter through Justin, and so in the Epitome there remains a strong theme of imperium and moderation.

== Account of Alexander ==
Much of the work focuses on the events surrounding the rise of Alexander and Greece, and the successor states arising from it. As one of only five surviving major accounts of Alexander, the Epitome, despite its flaws, provides an important insight into these events. In particular, it provides important insights into his father, and the namesake of the work, Philip II, with Justin being one of just two surviving narrative sources, alongside the earlier Diodorus. Unfortunately, the extent of these insights is minimized by Justin's limited interest in a comprehensive history, and so while Trogus is believed to have gone into significant detail about the conquests of Philip, Justin simply states "And so he established one kingdom and one people out of many clans and nations".

The Epitome also provides an account of Alexander's death, attributing it to his companion Antipater, who upon seeing the immoderation of Alexander, took it upon himself to poison him, with a poison so strong that it "could be conveyed [only] in the hoof of a horse".

== Reception ==
The work was very popular at the time of its release, quickly overtaking the principal to the extent that most of what we know about the principal is from the Epitome. It continued to be popular in the Middle Ages, from which period over two hundred copies survive. This popularity was maintained through the Renaissance, with editions being among the earlier generations of printed books, but started to lose popularity in the 19th and 20th centuries, when its reliability was called into question, culminating in a 113-year gap between English translations.
