= Aesopus (historian) =

Ancient Greek historian

Aesopus (Ancient Greek: Αἴσωπος, Aísōpos) was a Greek historian who wrote a life of Alexander the Great. The original is lost, but there is a Latin translation of it by Julius Valerius, of which Franciscus Juretus had a manuscript. It was first published, however, by A. Mai from a manuscript in the Biblioteca Ambrosiana in Milan in 1817. The title is Itinerarium ad Constantinum Atigustum, etc. : accedunt Julii Valerii Res gestae Alexandri Macedonis, etc. The time when Aesopus lived is uncertain, and even his existence has been doubted. Mai, in the preface to his edition, contended that the work was written before 389 AD, because the temple of Serapis at Alexandria, which was destroyed by order of Theodosius I, is spoken of in the translation as still standing. But serious objections to this inference have been raised by Letronne, who refers it to the 7th or 8th century, which the weight of internal evidence would rather point to. The book contains many factual errors, and is discredited by many historians.
