= Indus worm =

Mythical worm from the Indus river

The skōlex (Indus worm or the horrible Indian worm), in ancient Greek writings, was a supposed giant, white, carnivorous worm with a large pair of teeth that lived in the Indus River.

== Etymology ==
Gustav Oppert in the 19th century reasoned that skōlex referred to a like-sounding word in the Indian language, and was convinced the word was culukī (Sanskrit: चुलुकी) for "fish" or "porpoise". In his opinion, the word could refer even to a "crocodile" by extension. (Note: The Sanskrit c (/t͡ʃ/) is roughly approximated by Greek "sk".) Scholar Erik Seldeslachts, in a 1998 paper, has suggested parallel with kṛmiḥ (Sanskrit: कृमिः) which has the dual meaning of "worm" and a name of a nāgarāja or "serpent king".

== Description ==
Ctesias's Indica described the worm or skōlex (Greek: σκώληξ) as the only creature to inhabit the Indus. It resembled the worm which infested figs, but averaged 7 cubits (10 ft) in length. It had a pair of large teeth, one on the upper jaw and one on the lower. The teeth were square, measuring 1 pygōn in the Ancient Greek scale of length, about 15 inches long. (Note: The πυγών is defined as "the distance from the elbow to the first joint of the fingers" in Liddel's dictionary, or 15 inches/ 37cm in various source. It is translated as 4 feet by McCrindle, 18 inches by Scholfield) It burrowed in the mud bottom by day, and nocturnally devoured prey such as horses, cows, donkeys or camels. Philostratus, reporting on the creature of the same river system, (Note: The Hyphasis or Beas River) said it resembled a white worm, alluding to its color.

The worm was reputedly hunted with bait, and a volatile inflammable oil was collected from it. This oil was used in warfare by Indian kings; cities were set ablaze with the oil-filled sealed pots, thrown like grenades. This "skolex oil" may have actually been petroleum or naphtha, and not derived from an animal at all. Although, assuming the skolex referred to some crocodilian, oil could be extracted from this reptile. It is known that fish oils or the Ganges dolphin oil have been exploited in India, although not for incendiary purpose.

The worm may have given rise to the legend of the horned creature odontotyrannus of the Ganges, reported to have attacked Alexander the Great's troops.

== See also ==
- Mongolian death worm
