= Lamprecht =

German poet

Lamprecht, called der Pfaffe ("the Priest"), was a German poet of the twelfth century. He is the author of the Alexanderlied (“Song of Alexander”), the first German epic composed on a French model.

== Biography ==
Of him practically nothing personal is known but his name, the fact that he was a cleric, and that he wrote his poem around 1130. According to the poet's own statement, the model for his poem was a French poem on Alexander the Great by Albéric de Besançon. Only a portion of the beginning of the French original, 105 verses in all, is preserved (discovered and published by Paul Heyse, Berlin, 1856). The poem contained a fabulous account of the life and deeds of the great Macedonian conqueror as it was current in Greek and Latin versions of the early Middle Ages, such as the Greek romance of pseudo-Callisthenes, dating from the third century A.D., the Latin translation of Julius Valerius, the epitome thereof, and especially the free Latin version made by the Neapolitan archpresbyter Leo in the tenth century, known as the Historia de preliis.

A comparison of Lamprecht's opening lines with the fragment preserved of the French original shows that he followed his source with tolerable fidelity, adding, however, occasional moralizing comments or remarks of a learned nature. Altogether there are 7302 verses in short rhymed couplets, the rhyme being very imperfect.

Besides Albéric's poem, which itself is based on Valerius, Lamprecht used also the Historia de preliis and an "Iter ad paradisum", especially in the narration of the marvels seen by Alexander in the Far East, and in the account of the hero's journey to Paradise. There admittance is refused him, and he is made to realize the emptiness of earthly glory. Thus the close of the poem is distinctly moralizing in tone; the career of the great conqueror is but an illustration of the dictum concerning the vanity of earthly things. The poem seems to have been written in Middle Rhenish territory about 1130, at a time, therefore, when the crusades had brought the East nearer to the Western world, and when stories of its marvels were sure to find an eager audience.

== Manuscripts ==
There are three manuscripts of Lamprecht's poem extant, one from Vorau which is not quite complete, one from Strasburg dating from 1187, which is about five times as extensive as the preceding, and lastly a version interpolated in the manuscript of a Basel chronicle. The relationship of the manuscripts to one another is in doubt. The Vorau manuscript is generally regarded as the oldest and most authentic; that of Strasburg as an amplified recension. The Basel manuscript is certainly late and inferior in value to the other two.

== Editions ==
The "Alexanderlied" with German translation was first edited by Heinrich Weismann (2 vols., Frankfurt, 1850); the best edition is by Karl Kinzel in "Germanistische Handbibliothek", ed. Zacher, VI (Halle, 1884). The Vorau manuscript was edited by Joseph Diemer in "Deutsche Gedichte des 11. und 12. Jahrhunderts" (Vienna, 1849), the Strasburg manuscript by Hans Ferdinand Massmann in "Deutsche Gedichte des 11. und 12. Jahrhunderts" (Quedlinburg, 1837), and the Basel manuscript by Richard Maria Werner (Stuttgart, 1882) in "Bibliothek des Literarischen Vereins in Stuttgart", CLIV. Selections were edited by Paul Hermann Eduard Piper in "Die Spielmannsdichtung", II, 2; in "Kürschners Deutsche National Litteratur", II, pp. 116–82. A modern German translation by Richard Eduard Ottmann appeared in "Hendels Bibliothek der Gesamtlitteratur" (Halle, 1898).
