= Res gestae Alexandri Macedonis =

Earliest Latin Alexander Romance (4th c.)

The Res gestae Alexandri Macedonis (The Deeds of Alexander the Macedonian) is the earliest Latin translation of the Alexander Romance, usually dated between 270–330 AD and attributed to Julius Valerius Alexander Polemius. It was based on the α recension of the Romance, but it also has unique material, like the Letter of Zeuxis. The original meaning of the common material was kept, but Julius also wrote with an expansive style of narration, using the literary style of amplificatio. Julius was also impacted by the influence of some earlier authors, the most important one being that of Virgil especially in his Aeneid.

Julius' Res gestae was both sophisticated and complex. Because of this, a simpler and easier to read abridged version of the Latin translation composed in the 9th century, known as the Zacher Epitome, surpassed it in popularity. In the 12th century, another simple although distinct Latin recension of the Romance, known as the Historia de proeliis, was written, and became even more popular.

Earlier Latin works on Alexander the Great existed, such as a lengthy account of Alexander by the 1st century historian Quintus Curtius Rufus. Its title is similar to that of other works, such as the Res Gestae of Ammianus Marcellinus or the Res Gestae Divi Augusti.

== Author ==
The author of the Res gestae was Julius Valerius Alexander Polemius, a Greek native who would learn Latin during his studies. The name of the author (as listed in the manuscripts) is somewhat confusing as it contains two nomina and two cognomina, and so some have proposed that the last two elements of the name, Alexander Polemius, arose as a scribal confusion of the phrase Alexandrou polemoi, or "Alexander’s Wars". Nevertheless, most have accepted the full name as his real one and he is typically identified, as in the Prosopography of the Later Roman Empire, with Flavius Polemius, who was Consul in 338 and Comes of the East in 345.

== Manuscripts and dating ==
The work is extant in three manuscripts. The oldest manuscript is a badly damaged palimpsest from Turin, dating to the seventh century. The other two manuscripts date to the tenth century, from Milan, and the twelfth century, from Paris.

The Res gestae is often dated between 270–330, but also sometimes between 360–380 (sometime in the late third or fourth century). According to Richard Stoneman, the Iternarium (a later work that relies on the Res gestae) can be precisely dated between 340 and 345, meaning that the Res gestae must precede this. Stoneman also argues that the work must predate 330, as it describes the city of Rome as the capital of the empire, whereas in the year 330, the capital was moved from Rome to Constantinople. Likewise, the Aurelian Walls are mentioned in the text: these were built in 270, and so the work must date between 270 and 330.

== Influence ==
Around 350, an Itinerarium Alexandri was composed based on the Res gestae and a lost work of Alexander's biography by Arrian. It is sometimes speculated that Julius Valerius is also the author of the Itinerarium. Julius Valerius' complete works were also used by Albéric de Pisançon (c. 1130), a source for the Old French Roman d'Alexandre and the Alexanderlied of the German poet Pfaffe Lamprecht.

In the 9th-century, an abridged form of the Res gestae was written as the Zacher Epitome, also known as the Iulii Valerii Epitome which also became much more popular than the version of Julius and was the main conduit by which the Res gestae would subsequently exert its influence. It also influenced the Roman d'Alexandre as well as the Histoire ancienne jusquʾà César, the Roman de toute chevalerie by Thomas of Kent, and the Speculum historiale of Vincent of Beauvais.

== Editions ==
- 1888 Teubner edition by Bernard Kuebler.
- 2002 edition by Michaela Rosellini.

== See also ==
- Alexander the Great in legend
