= Thomas de Kent =

12th-century Anglo-Norman writer

Thomas de Kent or Thomas of Kent was a twelfth-century Anglo-Norman writer who wrote the Alexander romance Roman de toute chevalerie.

The work derives from the Zacher Epitome of Julius Valerius Alexander Polemius, but differs in certain respects. For example, it maps conquests by cardinal direction. This allows him to explain certain wonders in terms of a climate theory. Hercules is also invoked in comparison and the "exoticism" of the Orient is said to be rendered more excessively alluring and luxurious.
