= Nicobule =

Ancient Greek writer on Alexander the Great

Nicobule or Nicobula (Ancient Greek: Νικοβούλη, Nikoboúlē) was a Greek woman who may have authored a work on the life of Alexander the Great. No biographical details of her life have been preserved. Since her name is Greek, scholars tend to suggest that she was most probably writing during the first to third centuries AD, the period in which Hellenistic scholarship was most interested in Alexander.

Athenaeus (flourished circa 200 AD) cites two passages by Nicobule in reference to Alexander the Great and, in particular, Alexander's excessive drinking.
