= Decree of Philippi =

A Royal Decree of Alexander the Great, as an arbitration on a land dispute between the city of Philippi and local Thracians (presumably of the Edonian tribes), was discovered in a Byzantine basilica at Filippoi (1936) and published in 1984. The inscription, in two columns, bears the names of Leonnatus and Philotas, (possibly the companions), who act as arbitrators who would redraw the boundaries. The units of measurement mentioned, are plethra and stadia.

..whatever land given by Philip, to be cultivated by the Thracians, as well the land Alexander gave them....whatever land given by Philip around Siris and Daineros to be possessed by Philippi, the wood at Dysorum not to be sold by anybody, until the delegation of Alexander come back, the swamps belong to Philippi till the bridges

== See also ==
- Macedonia (ancient kingdom)#Institutions
