= Metz Epitome =

Late antiquity work on Alexander the Great

The Metz Epitome is a late antique summary of earlier historical fragments and covers the conquests of Alexander the Great between Hyrcania and northwest India. The only surviving manuscript was found in Metz, from which the text's name originates. The manuscript was destroyed during the Second World War, but there are two transcriptions of the original. The Epitome was part of the same manuscript as the so-called Liber de Morte Alexandri Magni Testamentumque (which may have been written by the same epitomator, as suggested by E. Baynham).

The sources of the anonymous author have much in common with the historian Cleitarchus, through the writings of Diodorus Siculus and Quintus Curtius Rufus. Non-Cleitarchan elements in the text seem to reflect a certain Hebraic view concerning Alexander.

The Epitome paints a unique portrait of Alexander and includes some information not found elsewhere but in view of its late authorship and the few additional historical fact it offers, the value of the Metz Epitome lies in its interpretation of Alexander's career rather than as a source for it.
