= Roman d'Alexandre =

12th-century Old French verse romance

- Romance of Alexander
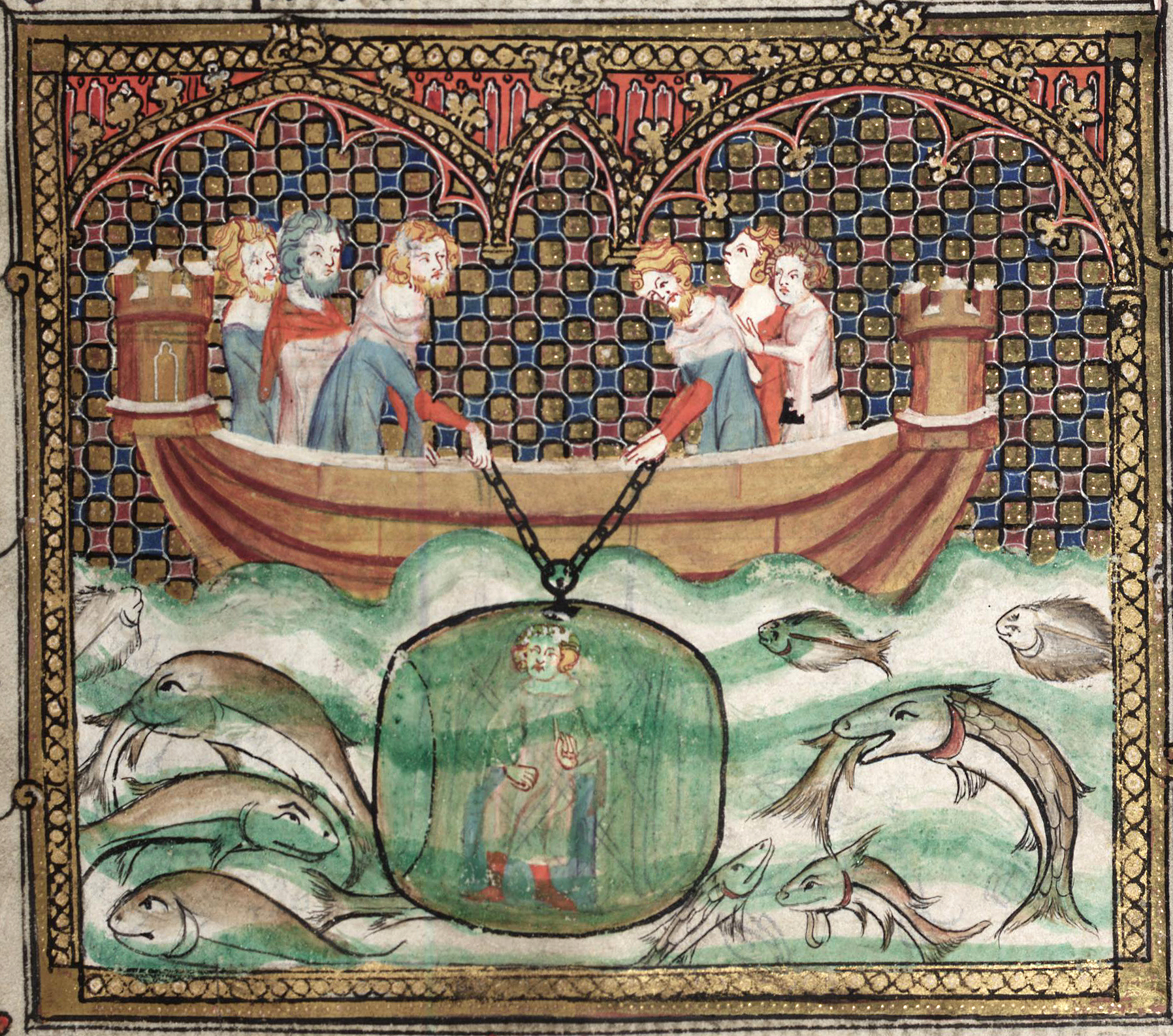
- Alexander the Great in a diving bell: a scene from the text.
- Original title: Old French: Li romans d'Alixandre
- Ascribed to: Alexander of Paris
- Date: 12th century
- Genre: Romance
- Length: 16,000 verses
- Subject: Alexander the Great

The Roman d'Alexandre, from the Old French Li romans d'Alixandre (English: "Romance of Alexander"), is a 16,000-verse twelfth-century Old French Alexander romance detailing various episodes in the life of Alexander the Great. It is considered by many scholars as the most important of the Medieval Alexander romances. Many of the manuscripts of the work are illustrated. The poem is generally divided into four branches (see below). The final form of the poem is largely credited to Alexander of Paris who probably placed the branches in the order we find them, reworked the first branch into alexandrines, incorporated the text of Pierre de Saint-Cloud, and added verses to join each branch.

The four branches:

1. The first branch (derived from the so-called Decasyllabic Alexander: Alexander's childhood leading to the siege of Tyre) derives from an anonymous Poitevin author who reworked, into decasyllables, a late eleventh or early twelfth century Franco-Provençal octosyllable version of the Alexander story by Albéric de Briançon (itself based in part on a ninth-century Latin epitome of the Julius Valerius' translation of the Alexander story).
2. The second branch (derived from the Fuerre de Gadres: telling of the taking of Tyre, the entry into Jerusalem and the defeat of Darius) was composed by a certain Eustache.
3. The third and longest branch (derived from Alixandre en Orient: includes Alexander's adventures in India and his underwater adventure) derives from Lambert de Tort of Châteaudun who used 12-syllable verses (which are called "alexandrines" because of their appearance in this work).
4. The fourth branch (derived in part from the so-called Mort Alixandre: his death and burial) is attributed in part to Alexander of Paris (also known as Alexandre de Paris) and in part to Pierre de Saint-Cloud.

== Analysis ==
Unlike other authors of the era who undertook the Alexander saga, Alexander of Paris did not base his work on the Pseudo-Callisthenes or on the various translations of Julius Valerius' work. As is common in medieval literature, the project stems from the desire to improve on the work of others and to offer the complete life of the hero to the public, a theme that is also very present in the cyclical turn that the chansons de geste took at the time. Thomas de Kent also penned (probably) the very same decade a version of the saga, Le roman de toute chevalerie, which is independent of Alexander of Paris's poem: Alexander's influence on the medieval imagination is thus shown as being as great, if not greater, than that of other pagan figures such as Hercules or Aeneas.

In part poème épique and roman, Alexandre's work explores in great detail (and ambiguity) the various facets of the character, combining both the "estoire rose" and "estoire noire". This results in a lush characterization that is absent in the previous poems. The poem also undertakes, like many medieval writings, the education of young noblemen (the "gentils chevalieres") and paints a picture of the political and social changes present at the time (the accession to power of common men and the poverty that thus strike the lower levels of nobility and the recentralization of power in 12th century France). Alexander is shown as generous, loyal and courageous: he is a protective and giving figure, the emblem of unification of the noblemen under one active and strong voice.

The exploration of the mysteries of India also is an important theme of the work, one that was surely impressive to the medieval public (akin to important scientific breakthroughs nowadays, for example). Not only brave and generous, our hero is also cunning and curious, wanting to understand the various phenomena that he will encounter on his path. The desire to conquer land and castles is thus reactivated by the desire to conquer the realm of knowledge (the voyage in the sky and underwater), but also the realm of immortality, as is shown by the will of the hero to equal mythic characters such as Hercules and Dionysus who became demi-gods after defeating their mortal conditions by various feat of strength and wisdom. Alexander will not realize this goal: poisoned by his own men (the "sers felons" Antipater and Divinuspater), as was another key figure of the work, Darius. The cause of the death of the hero is shrouded in ambiguity: prophetic in nature, it poses the problem of divine retribution, patricide and political mistakes. Was Alexander killed because of his desire to elevate himself to the gods' level? Was he killed by the magician Nectanabo, who is his father in the Greek and Roman tradition, and who also presided over his birth (Alexander kills him in a spite of rage)? Or was he killed because he gave his trust to men of inferior condition?

The poem, by not giving a definitive answer to this question, stresses the importance of respect of religious and father figures (whether real father figures, or authority figures in the feudal system), while reminding the young nobles who are the public of the tale to associate themselves only with other nobles. Very baroque in composition and esthetic, Alexander of Paris's version of the poem is the basis of Alexander's myth in the French literature to come with many continuations depicting mainly the vengeance of the "douze pairs" or shedding a different light on the life of the conqueror.
