= Prologi =

The Prologi are short anonymous Latin summaries of the 44 books of the lost Historiae Philippicae of Pompeius Trogus. The Prologi are similar in character to the Periochae to Livy's Ab Urbe Condita.

The Prologi are of uncertain date and authorship. They were transmitted together with Justin's Epitome of the Historiae but were not written by Justin. They probably circulated independently before becoming attached to Justin's Epitome. Since they contain information not found in Justin, they are not themselves derivative of his work but are an independent source of the lost Historiae. They represent a different perspective from Justin's on what was important in Trogus' work, but their terseness limits their utility as a check on Justin's methods of epitomization, his Epitome being much longer. From the Prologi, it can be seen that Justin often omits Trogus' geographic and ethnographic material.
