= Hagnothemis =

According to Plutarch, six years after Alexander the Great's death, Hagnothemis (Ancient Greek: Ἁγνόθεμις) claimed that Antipater was responsible for poisoning Alexander, and that it was Aristotle who instigated this and procured the poison. Hagnothemis claimed he had heard King Antigonus speak of this, and that the poison was "deadly cold" water distilled from a rock and so "cold and penetrating" that it could only be kept in an ass's hoof. Though the claim spread widely in antiquity, it is now considered unlikely.

Other than this brief passage in Plutarch, we have no further biographical details for Hagnothemis.
