= Antigenes (general) =

Ancient Macedonian general

- Satrap of Susiana
- Reign: c.323-316 BC
- Predecessor: Peucestas
- Successor: Aspeisas
- Died: 316 BC

Antigenes (Ancient Greek: Ἀντιγένης; died 316 BC) served as an officer under Philip II of Macedon and continued his service, rising to the rank of general, under Alexander the Great. He was a commander of the Argyraspides, or Silver Shields.

Antigenes had uncertain origins, but he is said to have been born sometime in 380, possibly in Pella or Pallene. He was noted for his bravery in battle, but according to an account by Plutarch, he was a slave to pleasure and vice. In 331, he came second in a contest of bravery and was promoted as a chiliarch of the Silver Shields and in command of 1,000 hypaspists.

Antigenes was shot in the face during a battle and lost an eye. He is said to have fought on, with the arrow still lodged in his face, until the battle was won. Plutarch provides several unflattering accounts, including claims that Antigenes fraudulently requested sick leave during Alexander’s campaign in order to return to his wife Telesippa, and subsequently attempted to defraud Alexander during the payment of veteran soldiers' debts at Susa. Antigenes used the testimony of a false witness to put himself on the debtors' list, and was relieved of his command after the fraud was discovered; Alexander pardoned him to prevent him from killing himself.

After the death of Alexander in 323 he obtained the satrapy of Susiana, taking over from the temporary rule of Peucestas. He was one of the commanders of the Argyraspides and, with his troops, took the side of Eumenes. On the defeat of Eumenes in 316, Antigenes fell into the hands of his enemy Antigonus I Monophthalmus, who had him burnt alive in a pit. Antigenes was executed in this particularly cruel manner because of his Silver Shields' exceptional performance against Antigonus' infantry during the Second War of the Diadochi. He was succeeded as satrap of Susiana by Aspeisas, a native appointee of Antigonus.
