= Gnaeus Pompeius Trogus =

Gallo-Roman historian

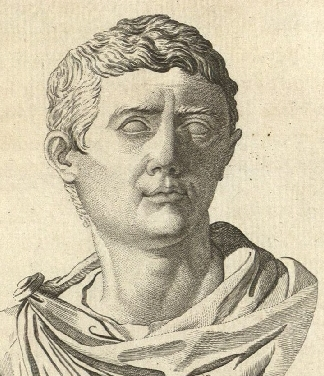
- 18th-century drawing of Gnaeus Pompeius Trogus
- Citizenship: Roman Empire
- Occupation: Historian
- Writing career
- Language: Latin
- Period: 1st century BC
- Genres: History
- Subject: Hellenistic period
- Notable work: Historiae Philippicae et Totius Mundi Origines et Terrae Situs
- Literary movement: Silver age of Latin literature

Gnaeus Pompeius Trogus (Note: Abbreviated Cn. Pompeius Trogus, the name also appears as "Cnaeus Pompeius Trogus" or, mistakenly, "Trogus Pompeius".) (fl. 1st century BC), also anglicized as Pompey Trogue, (Note: Less often, the mistaken "Trogue Pompey") was a Gallo-Roman historian from the Celtic Vocontii tribe in Narbonese Gaul who lived during the reign of the emperor Augustus, and was therefore a contemporary of Livy. Trogus seems to have been a polymath.

== Family ==
Pompeius Trogus's grandfather served under Pompey in his war against Sertorius. Owing to Pompey's influence, he was able to obtain Roman citizenship and his family adopted their patron's praenomen and nomen, Gnaeus Pompeius, as was customary. Trogus's father served under Julius Caesar as his secretary and interpreter.

== Works ==
Following Aristotle and Theophrastus, Pompeius Trogus wrote books on the natural history of animals and plants.

His principal work, however, was his 44-volume Philippic Histories and the Origin of the Whole World and the Places of the Earth (Historiae Philippicae et Totius Mundi Origines et Terrae Situs), now lost, which, according to its surviving epitome, had as its principal theme the Macedonian Empire founded by Philip II but functioned as a general history of all of the parts of the world which fell under the control of Alexander the Great and his successors, with extensive ethnographical and geographical digressions. Trogus began with Ninus, legendary founder of Nineveh, and ended at about the same point as Livy (AD 9). The development of the East from the Assyrians to the Parthians is given extensive coverage while early Roman history and the history of the Iberian Peninsula is briefly glossed in the last two books. The Philippic Histories is indebted to earlier Greek historians such as Theopompus (whose own Philippica may have suggested Trogus's title), Ephorus, Timaeus, and Polybius. On the grounds that such a work was beyond the ability of a Gallo-Roman, it has generally been assumed that Pompeius Trogus did not gather his material directly from these Greek sources but from an existing compilation or translation by a Greek such as the Universal History compiled by Timagenes of Alexandria.

== Style ==
Pompeius Trogus's idea of history was more exacting than that of Sallust and Livy, whom he criticized for their habit of putting elaborate speeches into the mouths of the characters of whom they wrote.

== On the Jews ==
Pompeius Trogus discusses the Jews in the context of the history of the Seleucid Empire. Along with the passages in Tacitus, the summary of Pompeius Trogus includes the most extensive description of the Jews in classical Latin literature. His main overview of the Jews is divided into 3 parts: 1. The Antiquities of the Jews - includes a combination of 3 different traditions: Damascus tradition, Biblical tradition and the Egyptian-Greek tradition hostile to the Exodus 2. A brief geographical description of the land of Judea. 3. A history of the Jews beginning with the Persian period.

Trogus used Greek sources for his composition. It is possible that the writing of the Jews he used the writings of Timagenes and perhaps also by Posidonius.

== Legacy ==
The original text of the Philippic Histories has been lost and is preserved only in excerpts by other authors (including Vopiscus, Jerome, and Augustine) and in a loose epitome by the later historian Justin. Justin aimed only to preserve the parts he felt most important or interesting about Pompeius Trogus's work, with the last recorded event being the recovery of Roman standards from the Parthians in 20 BC. In the manuscripts of Justin's works, however, a separate series of summaries (prologi) of the original work have been preserved. Even in their present mutilated state the works are often an important authority for the ancient history of the East.

Pompeius Trogus's works on animals and plants were extensively quoted in the works of Pliny the Elder.

== See also ==
- Augustan literature
