= Cleitarchus =

4th-century BC Greek historian

Cleitarchus or Clitarchus (Greek: Κλείταρχος, romanized: Kleitarchos) was one of the historians of Alexander the Great. Son of the historian Dinon of Colophon, he spent a considerable time at the court of Ptolemy Lagus. He was active in the mid to late 4th century BCE.

Quintilian (Institutio Oratoria. x. I. 74) credits him with more ability than trustworthiness, and Cicero (Brutus, II) accuses him of giving a fictitious account of the death of Themistocles. But there is no doubt that his history was very popular, and much used by Diodorus Siculus, Quintus Curtius, Justin and Plutarch, and the authors of the Alexander romances. His unnatural and exaggerated style became proverbial.

His work, the History of Alexander, is almost completely lost and has survived only in some thirty fragments preserved by ancient authors, especially by Aelian and Strabo.

A recent papyrological find from Oxyrhynchus (P.Oxy. LXXI 4808) records that he was a tutor (Greek: διδάσκαλος) of Ptolemy IV Philopator, r.221–205 BCE, and suggests that he wrote in the mid to late 3rd century, not, as was hitherto thought, in the late 4th. Luisa Prandi (2012) has recently restated the case for the "high" dating.
