= Alexander of Paris =

French poet

- Born: Bernay, Eure
- Occupation: Poet
- Writing career
- Pen name: Alexander of Bernay
- Language: French
- Period: 12th century
- Subject: Alexander the Great
- Notable work: Li romans d'Alexandre

Alexander of Paris, also known as Alexander of Bernay, was a Norman poet of the 12th century, who wrote Li romans d'Alexandre, one of the first poems written in French on the mythical exploits of Alexander the Great. It was composed in twelve-syllable lines, named alexandrines after this work (or possible after him). His work is notable for its portrayal of Alexander the Great as not merely a divine figure, and it inspired a series of subsequent texts that served to vernacularize Alexander the Great within the context of Medieval Europe. He was born in Bernay, Eure.
