= Justin (historian) =

Roman historian, 2nd century

Justin (Latin: Marcus Junianus Justinus Frontinus; (Note: Justin's name is given only in manuscripts of his own history, the majority of which simply identify him as Justinus. One manuscript identifies him as Justinus Frontinus, the other as Marcus Junianus Justinus. The accuracy of these names is uncertain.) fl. c. 2nd century AD) was a Latin writer and historian who lived under the Roman Empire.

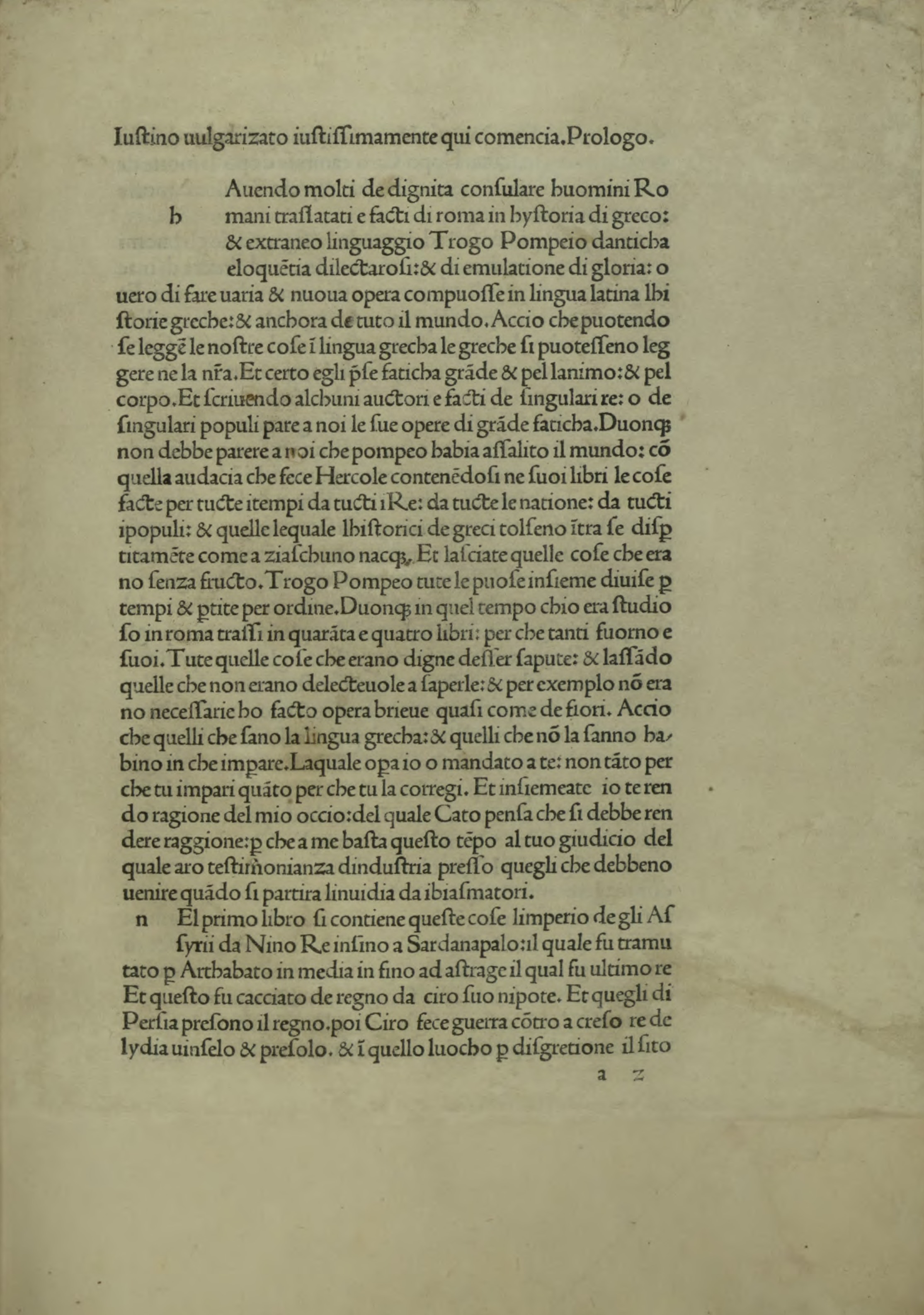
Epitome historiarum Trogi Pompeii

== Life ==
Almost nothing is known of Justin's personal history, his name appearing only in the title of his work. He must have lived after Gnaeus Pompeius Trogus, whose work he excerpted, and his references to the Romans and Parthians having divided the world between themselves would have been anachronistic after the rise of the Sassanians in the third century. His Latin appears to be consistent with the style of the second century. Ronald Syme, however, argues for a date around 390, immediately before the compilation of the Augustan History, and dismisses anachronisms and the archaic style as unimportant, as he asserts that readers would have understood Justin's phrasing to represent Trogus' time, and not his own.

== Works ==
Justin was the author of an epitome of Trogus' expansive Liber Historiarum Philippicarum, or Philippic Histories, a history of the kings of Macedon, compiled in the time of Augustus. Due to its numerous digressions, this work was retitled by one of its editors, Historia Philippicae et Totius Mundi Origines et Terrae Situs, or Philippic History and Origins of the Entire World and All of its Lands. Justin's preface explains that he aimed to collect the most important and interesting passages of that work, which has since been lost. Some of Trogus' original arguments (prologi) are preserved in various other authors, such as Pliny the Elder. Trogus' main theme was the rise and history of the Macedonian Empire, and like him, Justin permitted himself considerable freedom of digression, producing an idiosyncratic anthology rather than a strict epitome.

== Legacy ==
Justin's history was much used in the Middle Ages, when its author was sometimes mistakenly conflated with Justin Martyr.

== Bibliography ==
- Borgna, Alice (2018), "Ripensare la storia universale. Giustino e l'Epitome delle Storie Filippiche di Pompeo Trogo", Spudasmata.
- Syme, Ronald (1988), "The Date of Justin and the Discovery of Trogus", Historia, vol. 37, pp. 358–371.
