= Julius Valerius Alexander Polemius =

Julius Valerius Alexander Polemius (fl. c. 300 AD) was a translator of the Greek Alexander Romance, a romantic history of Alexander the Great, into Latin under the title Res gestae Alexandri Macedonis. The work is in three books on his birth, acts and death. The work is important in connection with the transmission of the Alexander story in the Middle Ages.

Polemius is tentatively identified by historians with one of the Roman consuls for the year 338. The appointment was unusual, as the emperor Constantine I had died the previous year, and custom prescribed that a new emperor – in this case, Constantine's sons – assumed the consulship in the year following his accession. This led Timothy Barnes to suggest that Polemius, who was probably a general, played a leading role in the purge which killed many members of the imperial family in 337, securing the succession of Constantine's sons, and that he received the consulship as a belated reward for this service. In 345, the same Polemius was a comes under the emperor Constantius II, and wrote a letter to the exiled bishop of Alexandria, Athanasius, encouraging him to return to his see.

The complete Res gestae is known from four manuscripts and five fragments. It circulated more widely in several epitomes produced in the eighth and ninth centuries, the most prominent of which is the Zacher Epitome, named after its first editor, Julius Zacher, and known from 67 manuscripts. The latter retains most of the first book and progressively less of books two and three. It only mentions the Epistola Alexandri ad Aristotelem in passing, which was thus often copied alongside it. The other popular epitomes were the Oxford-Montpellier and the Liegnitz-Historia.

== Citations ==
Political offices
Preceded by Felicianus; Fabius Titianus	Roman consul 338; With: Ursus	Succeeded by Constantius Augustus II; Constans Augustus
