= Alexander Romance =

Account of the life and exploits of Alexander the Great

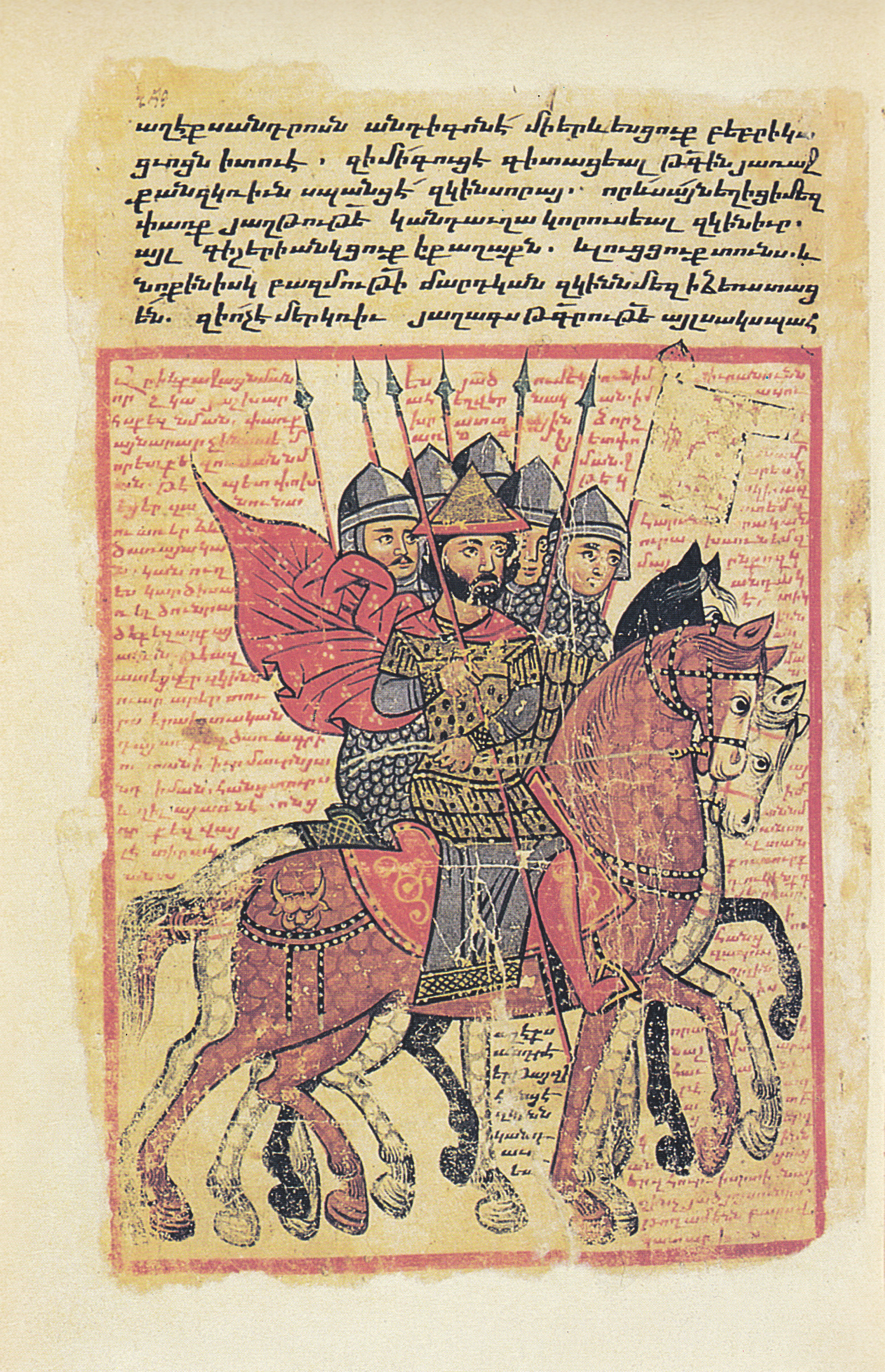
Armenian illuminated manuscript of the 14th century

The Alexander Romance is an account of the life and exploits of Alexander the Great. Of uncertain authorship, it has been described as "antiquity's most successful novel". The book describes Alexander the Great from his birth, to his succession of the throne of Macedon, his conquests including that of the Persian Empire, and finally his death. Although constructed around a historical core, the book is mostly fantastical, including many miraculous tales and encounters with mythical creatures, such as sirens or centaurs. In this context, the term romance refers not to the meaning of the word in modern times but in the Old French sense of a novel or roman, a "lengthy prose narrative of a complex and fictional character" (although Alexander's historicity did not deter ancient authors from using this term).

It was widely copied and translated, accruing various legends and fantastical elements at different stages. The original version was composed in Koine Greek some time before 338 AD, when a Latin translation was made, although the exact date is unknown. Some manuscripts pseudonymously attribute the text's authorship to Alexander's court historian Callisthenes, and so the author is commonly called Pseudo-Callisthenes.

In premodern times, the Alexander Romance underwent more than 100 translations, elaborations, and derivations in dozens of languages, including almost all European vernaculars as well as in every language from the Islamicized regions of Asia and Africa, from Mali to Malaysia. Some of the more notable translations were made into Coptic, Ge'ez, Middle Persian, Byzantine Greek, Arabic, Persian, Armenian, Syriac, and Hebrew. Owing to the great variety of distinct works derived from the original Greek romance, the "Alexander romance" is sometimes treated as a literary genre, instead of a single work.

== Plot ==
Nectanebo II, the last Pharaoh of Egypt, foresees that his kingdom will fall to the Persians and so flees to the Macedonian court under the guise of the identity of a magician. In his time there, he falls in love with the wife of king Philip II of Macedon, Olympias. Olympias becomes pregnant by Nectanebo, but his paternity is kept a secret. Philip develops a suspicion of an affair between the two, but Nectanebo allays Philip's suspicions by sending a magic sea-hawk to him in a dream. Alexander is born from this pregnancy, but while he is growing up he kills Nectanebo, who reveals Alexander's paternity as he dies. Alexander begins to be educated by Aristotle and competes in the Olympics.

After Philip dies, Alexander begins his campaigns into Asia, although the story is unclear with respect to the order and location of the campaigns. Once he reaches Egypt, an oracle of the god Amun instructs him where to go to create the city that will become Alexandria. The march into Asia continues and Alexander conquers Tyre. He begins exchanging letters with the Persian emperor Darius III, though the story now delves into more campaigns in Greece. The Persian march resumes and eventually Alexander conquers the Persians. He marries Roxane, the daughter of Darius, and writes letters to Olympias describing all he saw and his adventures during his conquests, including his wandering through the Land of Darkness, search for the Water of Life, and more.

Next, he proceeds to conquer India from which he writes letters to Aristotle, though he also receives an omen about his coming death in this time. He visits the temples of the sun and moon, and makes the Amazons his subjects. During his return, as he reaches Babylonia, he meets the son of Antipater (the figure ruling Macedonia in Alexander's stead during the journeys of the latter) who was sent to poison Alexander. The conspiracy succeeds, and Alexander begins to die, though he names the rulers who will control the provinces of his empire after he is gone before ultimately succumbing to the poison. Ptolemy I Soter receives his body in the Egyptian city of Memphis where the priests order it to be sent to Alexandria, the greatest city he had built during his march. The work concludes by providing a list of all the cities that Alexander founded.

== Motifs and themes ==
=== Gates of Alexander ===
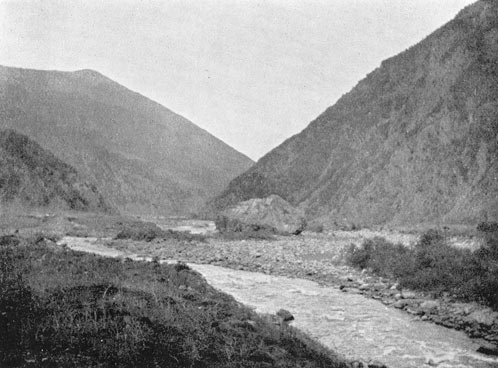
The Darial Gorge before 1906

The Romance locates the Gates of Alexander between two mountains called the "Breasts of the North" (Greek: Μαζοί Βορρά). The mountains are initially 18 feet apart and the pass is rather wide, but Alexander's prayers to God causes the mountains to draw nearer, thus narrowing the pass. There he builds the Caspian Gates out of bronze, coating them with fast-sticking oil. The gates enclosed twenty-two nations and their monarchs, including Gog and Magog (therein called "Goth and Magoth"). The geographic location of these mountains is rather vague, described as a 50-day march away northwards after Alexander put to flight his Belsyrian enemies (the Bebrykes, of Bithynia in modern-day North Turkey).

=== Horns of Alexander ===
In the α recension of the Alexander Romance, Alexander's father is an Egyptian priest named Nectanebo who sports a set of ram horns. After his death, Alexander is described as "the horned king" (βασιλέα κερασφόρον) by an oracle instructing Ptolemy, a general of Alexander, on where to bury him. This statement was repeated in the Armenian recension of the Alexander Romance in the 5th century. The use of the horned motif, representing the horns of Zeus Ammon to visualize Alexander stems from much earlier, originally in coinage depicting Alexander by his immediate successors Ptolemy I Soter of Egypt and more prominently the king of Thrace Lysimachus were the earliest produce coinage of Alexander with the rams horns. The motif would be carried over into later Alexander legends, such as the Armenian translation of α and the Syriac Alexander Legend.

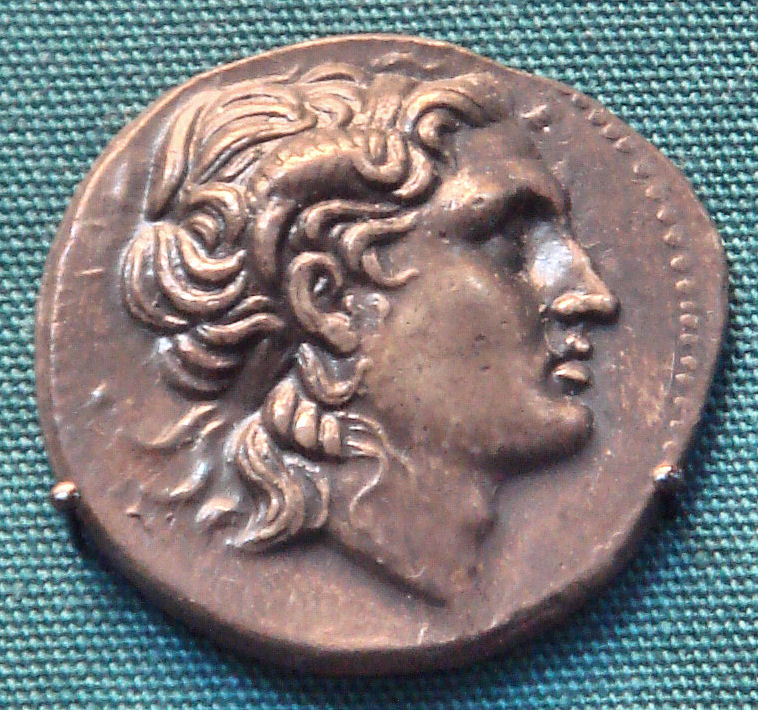
A coin depicting Alexander wearing the horns of Zeus-Ammon, minted by Lysimachus 40 years after the death of Alexander

=== Fountain of Life ===
Traditions about Alexander's search for the Fountain of Life were influenced by earlier legends about the Mesopotamian hero Gilgamesh and his search for immortality, such as in the Epic of Gilgamesh. Alexander is travelling along with his company in search of the Land of the Blessed. On the way to the Land, Alexander becomes hungry and asks one of his cooks, Andreas, to get him some meat. Andreas gets some fish and begins to wash it in a fountain. Immediately upon being washed, the fish sprang to life and escaped into the fountain. Realizing he has discovered the Fountain of Life, Andreas tells no one else about it and drinks the water for himself. He also stores away some of the water into a silver vessel, hoping to use some of it to seduce Alexander's daughter. Meanwhile, Alexander eventually reaches the Land of the Blessed but is unable to enter it. At the same time, he learns of Andreas losing the fish and questions him over it. Andreas confesses about what happened with the fish, and he is whipped for it, but he denies that he drank any and does not mention that he stored some, and asks Alexander over why he should worry about the past. At a later point, Andreas manages to use the water to seduce Alexander's daughter, who is enticed by the opportunity to drink from it, which she does and becomes immortal. Alexander learns of the miracle and punishes both Andreas and his daughter greatly: for Andreas is turned into a daimōn of the sea and his daughter into a daimōn of the desert. This story was elaborated on in subsequent versions of the Romance, such as in the Syriac Song of Alexander and in the Talmud.

=== Land of Darkness ===
The original Alexander Romance contains a few statements that would develop into the fully-fledged myths of episodes in the Land of Darkness, especially in versions of the Romance in Islamicate lands. In a journey that is directed towards Polaris, the Polar constellation, he is to find the Land of the Blessed at the edge of the world which in "a region where the sun does not shine" (2.39).

The Land of Darkness becomes a prominent feature in subsequent recensions of the Alexander Romance.

== Sources ==
Two books appear to be the main sources used by the author of the Alexander Romance. One was a collection of Alexander fictions involving pseudepigraphical letters between Alexander and other figures such as Aristotle and adversaries of his like Darius III, as well as dialogues with Indian philosophers among other material. The second was the History of Alexander written by Cleitarchus (c. 300 BC), now lost, containing an already mythologized account of Alexander. Historians also suspect the use of Greek-language Egyptian sources underlying traditions about the pharaohs Nectanebo II and Sesostris. By contrast, oral tradition did not play an important role. A strikingly close parallel to Alexander's relentless quest, though one limited by the constraints of human and mortal existence, is in the Epic of Gilgamesh.

== Commentaries ==
The first commentary to the Romance was a German work titled Der griechische Alexanderroman, published by Adolf Ausfeld in 1907. In 2017, a commentary of the entire Alexander Romance was published in English by Krzysztof Nawotka.

== Editions and translations ==
The first modern English translation of the Romance was produced by E.H. Haight in 1955. The major modern English translation of the Romance is that of Richard Stoneman in 1991. Significant French translations include those of Tallet-Bonvalot in 1994, and Bounoure & Serret in 2004. An Italian translation was produced by Franco in 2001. In 2010, a Polish translation was published by Krzysztof Nawotka.

Between 2007 and 2014, Richard Stoneman published the first two volumes of an edition of the Romance in three volumes, titled Il Romanzo di Alessandro. Each volume contains one book of recensions α, β and γ of the Greek text and of the Latin text of Julius Valerius, each text having a facing-page Italian translation.

== Transmission ==
Throughout classical antiquity and the Middle Ages, the Romance experienced numerous expansions and revisions exhibiting a variability unknown for more formal literary forms. Distinctively, and unlike other texts, none of the recensions (including in Greek) of the Romance can be considered canonical. Furthermore, translations were not merely so but were also typically variant versions of the text. The legendary Alexander was also widely assimilated into the religion and culture of those who wrote about him: in Christian legends, Alexander became a Christian; in Islamic legends, Alexander became a Muslim; he was an Egyptian for the Egyptians, a Persian for the Persians, and so forth.

=== West ===
In Europe, the popularity of the Alexander Romance resurged when Leo the Archpriest discovered a Greek copy in Constantinople while he was on a diplomatic missions. He produced a translation into Latin titled the Nativitas et historia Alexandri Magni regis, which became the basis of the far more successful and expanded version known as the Historia de Proeliis, which went through three recensions between the twelfth and fifteenth centuries and made Alexander a household name throughout the Middle Ages, being translated more times in the next three centuries than any other text except for the Gospels. Another very popular Latin version was the Alexandreis of Walter of Châtillon. Before Leo, versions of the Romance were still known: an abridged 9th-century version of the much earlier Latin translation by Julius Valerius Alexander Polemius, the Zacher Epitome, achieved some popularity. In addition, in 781, Alcuin sent Charlemagne a copy of a text known as Collatio Alexandri et Dindimi. The principal manuscript of Beowulf also contains a translation of Alexander's letter to Aristotle.

Translations from Leo's Latin version and its recension would subsequently be made into all the major languages of Europe as versions of the Alexander romance became the most popular form of medieval European literature after the Bible, such as Old French (12th century), Middle Scots (The Buik of Alexander, 13th century), Italian, Spanish (the Libro de Alexandre), Central German (Lamprecht's Alexanderlied, and a 15th-century version by Johannes Hartlieb), Slavonic, Romanian, Hungarian, Irish, and more.

=== East ===
The Syriac Alexander Romance, the most important Syriac translation of the Greek Romance, as well as the much shorter and abridged version known in the Syriac Alexander Legend, composed either in ~630 shortly after Heraclius defeated the Persians or in the mid-6th century during the reign of Justinian I, contains additional motifs not found in the earliest Greek version of the Romance, including the apocalypticization of the wall built against Gog and Magog. Subsequent Middle Eastern recensions of the Alexander legend were generated following the Syriac traditions, including versions in Arabic, Persian (Iskandarnameh), Ethiopic, Hebrew (in the first part of Sefer HaAggadah), Ottoman Turkish (14th century), and Middle Mongolian (13th-14th century). Knowledge of Romance tradition entered Chinese texts by the 12th century, but ancient Indian texts do not mention Alexander.

The Epic of Sundiata, an epic poem for the Mandinka people, structures the story of the hero and founder of the Mali Empire, Sundiata Keita, in a way that resembles the biography and legends of Alexander.

== Versions ==
=== Greek ===
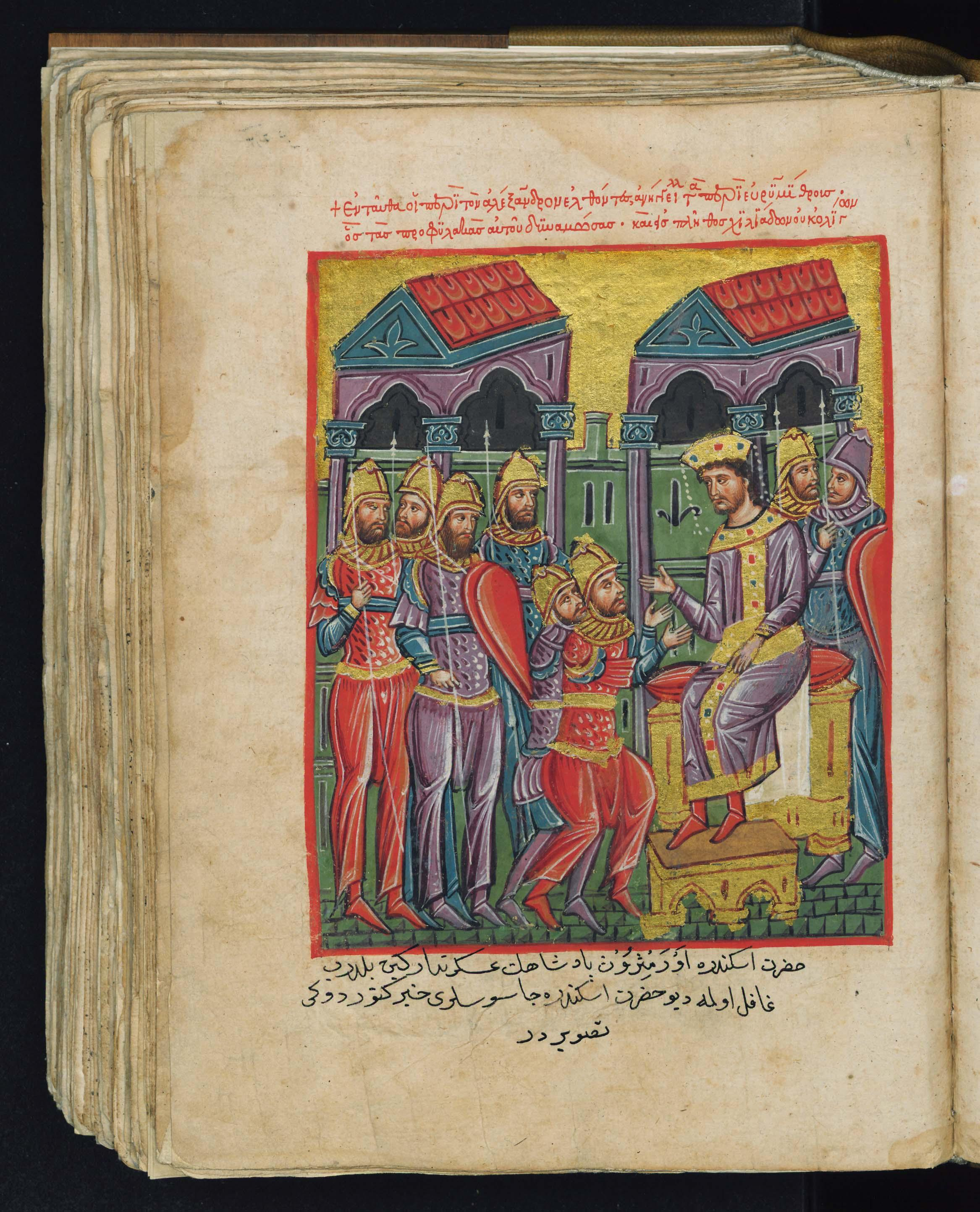
The Alexander Romance in a 14th century Byzantine manuscript kept in the Church of San Giorgio dei Greci, Venice.

The most important Greek recensions of the Alexander Romance are the α, β, γ and ε recensions. There is also a variant of β called λ, and the now-lost δ was perhaps the most important in the transmission of the text into the non-Greek world as it was the basis of the 10th-century Latin translation produced by Leo the Archpriest.

==== Alpha (α) recension ====
The Recensio α, also known as the Historia Alexandri Magni, is the oldest and can be dated to the 3rd century AD. It is known from one manuscript, called A. It was subjected to various revisions during the Byzantine Empire, some of them recasting it into poetical form in Medieval Greek vernacular. Recensio α is the source of a Latin version by Julius Valerius Alexander Polemius (4th century), as well as an Armenian version (5th century).

==== Beta (β) recension ====
The β recension was composed between 300 and 550 AD. It rephrases much material in α and also adds new material to it. Compared to α, it lacks the end of Book I and the first six chapters of Book II. However, it contains the end of Book II, which is missing from α.

==== Epsilon (ε) recension ====
The ε recension is a Byzantine reworking of the Alexander Romance, known in full only from the Bodleian manuscript Barocci 17. It was probably composed in the early 8th century to 9th centuries AD; its interpolation of the Gog and Magog episode from the Apocalypse of Pseudo-Methodius gives a terminus post quem after 691/692. It rewrites the α recension while borrowing from β, abandons the earlier three-book structure, and is the most innovative and intertextual of the Greek recensions: it adds Alexander’s journey to Jerusalem and conversion to the God of the Jews, battles with monstrous peoples and wild women, relocates the Candace episode from Ethiopia to Amastris on the Black Sea. Other episodes revised by the text include the poisoning of Alexander, and his subsequent death and succession with an older testament being replaced by a division of his conquered territory among the Diadochi. Its stronger emphasis on wonders, prophecy, and Christianizing biography made it important for later Byzantine, vernacular Greek, Slavic, Arabic, and Hebrew Alexander traditions.

==== Gamma (γ) recension ====
The γ recension is a later and much larger Byzantine compilation, preserved in three manuscripts. Since it depends on ε, it cannot be earlier than the 8th or 9th century AD, while the upper limit of its date is set by its oldest manuscripts, dating to the 14th century. The language in the text is old, indicating that it falls within an earlier period of its possible dating range. It combines the β and ε recensions, mostly following β while inserting large amounts of ε material. It adds a long passage from Palladius of Helenopolis' On the Races of India and the Brahmans in the Gymnosophists episode and the work ends by cataloguing the peoples that were subdued by Alexander. The redactor seems to have aimed at an exhaustive synthesis, but intervened selectively to magnify Alexander: he suppresses episodes that diminish the hero, such as the sack of Thebes in β and the suggestion of suicide in ε, while exaggerating themes with moral and eschatological dimensions (like the memento mori treatment of Alexander’s death).

==== Recension manuscripts ====
- Recensio α sive Recensio vetusta: Wilhelm Kroll, Historia Alexandri Magni, vol. 1. Berlin: Weidmann, 1926
- Recensio β:
  - L. Bergson, Der griechische Alexanderroman. Stockholm: Almqvist & Wiksell, 1965
  - e cod. Leidensi Vulc. 93. L. Bergson, Der griechische Alexanderroman. Rezension β. Stockholm: Almqvist & Wiksell, 1965
  - e cod. Paris. gr. 1685 et cod. Messinensi 62): L. Bergson, Der griechische Alexanderroman. Stockholm: Almqvist & Wiksell, 1965
- Recensio γ:
  - lib. 1: U. von Lauenstein, Der griechische Alexanderroman. [Beiträge zur klassischen Philologie 4. Meisenheim am Glan: Hain, 1962]
  - lib. 2: H. Engelmann, Der griechische Alexanderroman. [Beiträge zur klassischen Philologie 12. Meisenheim am Glan: Hain, 1963]
  - lib. 3: F. Parthe, Der griechische Alexanderroman. [Beiträge zur klassischen Philologie 33. Meisenheim am Glan: Hain, 1969]
- Recensio δ:
  - e cod. Vat. gr. 1700, 88v‑89r: G. Ballaira, "Frammenti inediti della perduta recensione δ del romanzo di Alessandro in un codice Vaticano", Bollettino del comitato per la preparazione dell'edizione nazionale dei classici greci e latini 13 (1965)
- Recensio ε: Jürgen Trumpf, Anonymi Byzantini vita Alexandri regis Macedonum. Stuttgart: Teubner, 1974
- Recensio λ:
  - lib. 3: Helmut van Thiel, Die Rezension λ des Pseudo-Kallisthenes. Bonn: Habelt 1959
  - Pseudo-Methodius redactio 1: H. van Thiel, Die Rezension λ des Pseudo-Callisthenes. Bonn: Habelt 1959
  - Pseudo-Methodius redactio 2: H. van Thiel, Die Rezension λ des Pseudo-Kallisthenes. Bonn: Habelt 1959
- Recensio F (cod. Flor. Laurentianus Ashburn 1444), vernacular: V.L. Konstantinopulos and A.C. Lolos, Ps.-Kallisthenes ‑ Zwei mittelgriechische Prosa-Fassungen des Alexanderromans, 2 vols [Beiträge zur klassischen Philologie 141 & 150, Meisenheim am Glan: Hain 1983]
- Recensio φ: G. Veloudis, Ἡ φυλλάδα τοῦ Μεγαλέξαντρου. Διήγησις Ἀλεξάνδρου τοῦ Μακεδόνος [Νέα Ἑλληνικὴ Βιβλιοθήκη 39. Athens: Hermes, 1977]
- Recensio Byzantina poetica (cod. Marcianus 408): S. Reichmann, Das byzantinische Alexandergedicht nach dem codex Marcianus 408 herausgegeben [Beiträge zur klassischen Philologie 13. Meisenheim am Glan: Hain, 1963]
- Recensio E (cod. Eton College 163), vernacular: V.L. Konstantinopulos and A.C. Lolos, Ps.-Kallisthenes, Zwei mittelgriechische Prosa. Fassungen des Alexanderromans, 2 vols [Beiträge zur klassischen Philologie 141 & 150‑ Meisenheim am Glan: Hain 1983]
- Recensio V (cod. Vind. theol. gr. 244): K. Mitsakis, Der byzantinische Alexanderroman nach dem Codex Vind. Theol. gr. 244 [Miscellanea Byzantina Monacensia 7. Munich: Institut für Byzantinistik und neugriechische Philologie der Universität, 1967]
- Recensio K (cod. 236 Kutlumussiu, Athos), vernacular: K. Mitsakis, "Διήγησις περὶ τοῦ Ἀλεξάνδρου καὶ τῶν μεγάλων πολέμων", Byzantinisch-neugriechische Jahrbücher 20 (1970)
- Recensio poetica (recensio R), vernacular: D. Holton, Διήγησις τοῦ Ἀλεξάνδρου. The Tale of Alexander. The Rhymed Version [Βυζαντινὴ καὶ Νεοελληνικὴ βιβλιοθήκη. Thessalonica, 1974]

=== Latin ===
- The Res gestae Alexandri Macedonis by Julius Valerius Alexander Polemius, the first Latin translation of the Alexander Romance, made from its α recension.
- The Zacher Epitome, a 9th-century abridged and much more popular version of the Res gestae by Julius.
- The Nativitas et victoria Alexandri Magni regis (The Birth and Victories of King Alexander the Great) is a lost tenth-century translation of the Alexander Romance by Leo of Naples, translated from a Greek copy he discovered in Constantinople while he was on a diplomatic mission commissioned by John III of Naples.
- The Historia de Preliis, which was based on Leo's earlier version. It went through three recensions between the twelfth and fifteenth centuries and made Alexander a household name throughout the Middle Ages. The three recensions are called I^{1}, I^{2}, and I^{3} (also called J^{1}, J^{2}, and J^{3} in some publications).
- The Alexandreis, a medieval Latin epic poem by Walter of Châtillon, a 12th-century French writer and theologian.

=== Romance languages ===
==== French ====
There are several Old and Middle French and one Anglo-Norman Alexander romances. The following list of works is taken from the one provided by Donald Maddox and Sara Sturm-Maddox 2002.

- Alexandre by Albéric de Pisançon, composed c. 1110–1125.
- Roman d'Alexandre, also known as the Li romans d'Alixandre (c. 1160), attributed to clergyman Alexandre de Bernay.
- Decasyllabic Alexander, by an anonymous author between 1160 and 1170.
- Le Roman de Fuerre de Gadres by a certain Eustache, later used by Alexandre de Bernay and Thomas de Kent, composed c. 1170.
- Alixandre en Orient by Lambert de Tort, composed c. 1170.
- Mort Alixandre, an anonymous fragment of which 159 lines survive, composed c. 1170.
- The Roman de toute chevalerie, an Anglo-Norman work of Thomas de Kent. This became the basis for the Middle English King Alysaunder. Composed c. 1175–1180.
- La Venjance Alixandre by Jehan le Nevelon, composed c. 1180.
- The Roman d'Alexandre of Alexandre de Paris, composed c. 1185 (not to be confused by the work of the same name by Alexandre de Barnay).
- Le Vengement Alixandre by Gui de Cambrai, composed c. 1191.
- The Histoire ancienne jusquʾà César, composed c. 1213–14.
- Roman d'Alexandre en prose, by an anonymous author, the most popular Old French version, composed sometime in the 13th century.
- Prise de Defur, from Picardy c. 1250.
- Voyage d'Alexandre au Paradis terrestre, a French adaptation (c. 1260) of the Latin Iter ad paradisum.
- Les Vœux du paon of Jacques de Longuyon, the first of three works in the Paon Cycle.
- Le Restor du Paon of Jean le Court, composed before 1338 and a continuation of the Les Voeux de paon.
- Le Parfait du paon by Jean de Le Mote, the final poem of the Paon Cycle. Composed c. 1340.
- The Histoire du bon roy Alixandre by Jean Wauquelin, composed before 1448.
- Fais et concquestes du noble roy Alexandre, a late medieval prose version. Composed c. 1450–1470.
- Faits du grand Alexandre by Vasque de Lucène, a prose translation (1468) of Quintus Curtius Rufus's Historiae Alexandri Magni. Composed c. 1468.

==== Italian ====
Italian versions of the Alexander Romance include:

- The Historia Alexandri Regis of Quilichino, composed in 1236 in Recanati. It was fairly popular, as indicated by the survival of twenty manuscripts of the work.
- The Alessandreide in rima of Jacopo di Carlo.
- The Istoria Alexander Regis of Domenico Scolari.
- The I Nobili fatti di Alessandro Magno, from the 14th century, edited by Grion.

==== Romanian ====
The Romanian Alexander Romance, entitled the Alexandria, was derived from a Greek and Serbian variant and became the most widely-read literary text in Romania between the sixteenth to eighteenth centuries. In 1833, the Romanian legend was translated into Bulgarian in a copy of an earlier work, Paisiy Hilendarski's Slavic-Bulgarian History (1762).

==== Spanish ====
The two most important Spanish versions of the Alexander Romance are:

- The Libro de Alexandre. This was a famous anonymous poem of the Alexander Romance from Christian Spain.
- The Historia novelada de Alejandro Magno. This is an obscure Spanish version, only having been discovered an edition of Part 4 of Alfonso X's General Estoria in a recently printed edition.

=== Germanic languages ===
==== English and Scots ====
In medieval England, the Alexander Romance experienced remarkable popularity. It is even referred to in Chaucer's Canterbury Tales, where the monk apologizes to the pilgrimage group for treating a material so well known. There are five major romances in Middle English that survive, though most only in fragments. There are also two versions from Scotland, one sometimes ascribed to the Early Scots poet John Barbour, which exists only in a sixteenth-century printing; and a Middle Scots version from 1499:

- King Alisaunder from c. 1275.
- The Romance of Alisaunder (or Alexander of Macedon), sometimes referred to as Alexander A, is a fragment of 1247 lines written in alliterative verse. It was probably written between 1340 and 1370, soon before the beginning of the Alliterative Revival, of which it is believed to be one of the oldest remaining poems. It has been preserved in a school notebook dating from 1600. Alexander A deals with the begetting of Alexander by Nectanebo II (Nectanebus), his birth, and his early years, and ends with the midst of the account of Philip's siege of Byzantium. It is likely that the source for this fragment has been the I^{2}-recension of the Historia de Preliis. Beside that it has been expanded with additional material taken from Paulus Orosius's Historiae adversum paganos, the adverse remarks, which are typical of Orosius, however have been omitted by the poet, whose main concern is Alexander's heroic conduct.
- Alexander and Dindimus, sometimes referred to as Alexander B, is also written in alliterative verse. This fragment is found in the MS Bodley 264 and consists of five letters which are passed between Alexander and Dindimus, who is the king of the Brahmins, a people of philosophers who shun all worldly lusts, ambitions and entertainments. In this respect their way of life resembles the ideal of an aescetic life, which was also preached by medieval monastic orders, such as the Franciscans. The source of Alexander B again is the I^{2}-recension of the Historia de Preliis.
- The Wars of Alexander, sometimes referred to as Alexander C, is the longest of the alliterative versions of the Middle English Alexander Romances. It goes back to the I^{3}-recension of the Historia de Preliis and can be found in the MS Ashmole 44 and in the Dublin Trinity College MS 213. Although both manuscripts are incomplete they supplement each other fairly well. In this version much space is given to letters and prophecies, which often bear a moralizing and philosophical tenor. The letters are an integral part of the Pseudo-Callisthenes tradition. The dominant theme is pride, which inevitably results in the downfall of kings. In The Wars of Alexander the hero is endowed with superhuman qualities, which shows in the romance insofar as his enemies fall to him by the dozens and he is always at the center of action.
- The Prose Life of Alexander copied by Robert Thornton, c. 1440.

Middle Scots versions include:

- The Buik of Alexander, anonymous, attributed to John Barbour, dates to 1438 according to its first printed edition from 1580.
- The Buik of King Alexander the Conquerour by Gilbert Hay, 1499.

==== German ====
- The German Song of Alexander by Lamprecht, composed around 1150 as an adaptation of a poem by Albéric of Pisançon some fifty years earlier. It does not directly survive but in a version of it, close to the original, produced by Vorau.
- Alexander of Strasbourg.
- Alexander of Basel.

==== Norse ====
- The Alexanders saga was an Old Norse translation of the Latin epic Alexandreis. It is attributed in manuscripts of the saga to Brandr Jónsson, bishop of Skálholt who is also said to have been responsible for authoring Gyðinga saga.
- The Bréf Alexandri Magni (Bréf), an Old Norse adaptation of the Epistola Alexandri ad Aristotelem.
- The Old Swedish Konung Alexander, a metrical version of the Historia de preliis from its I^{2} recension.

=== Slavic ===
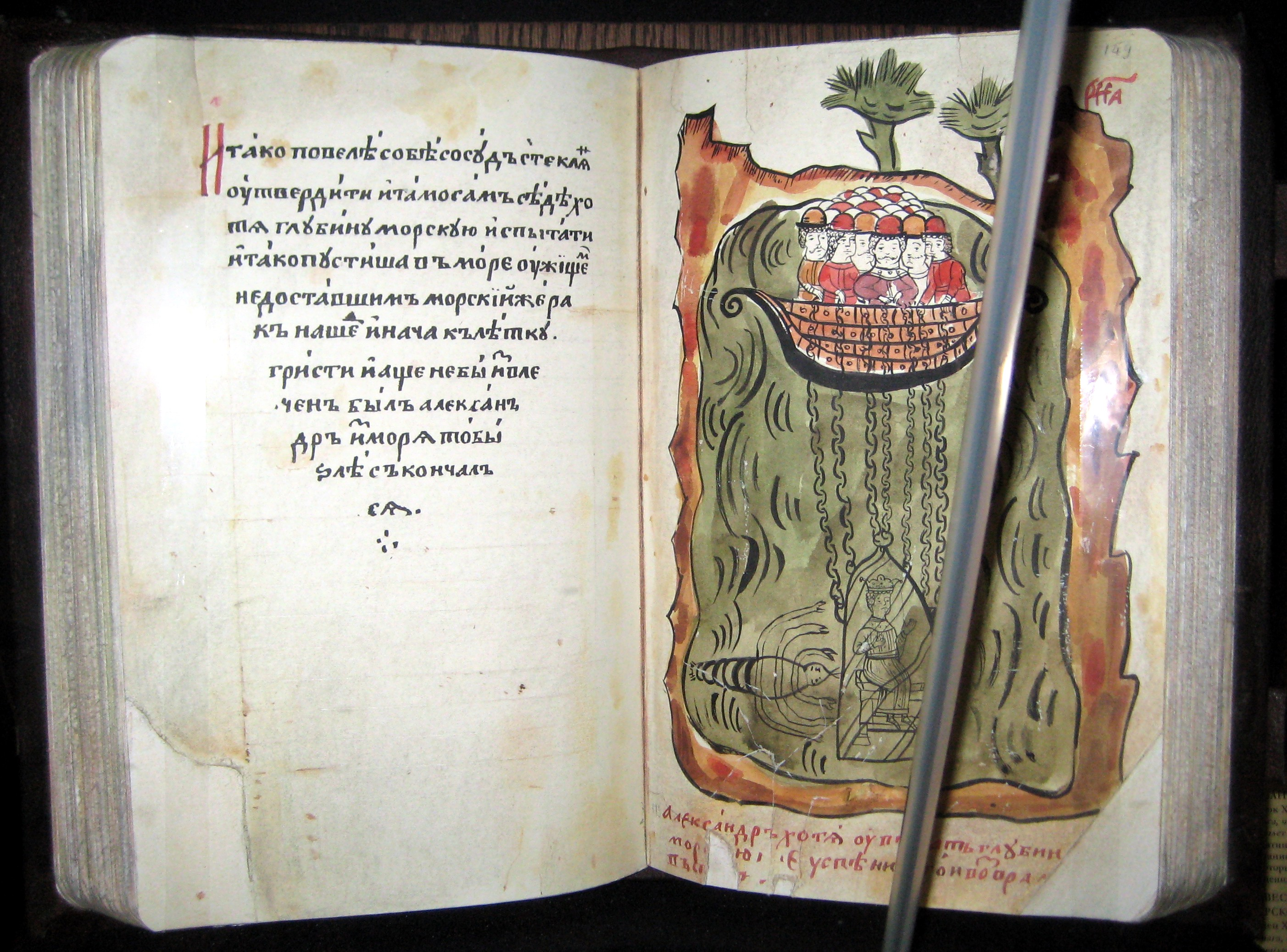
17th-century manuscript of an Alexandrine novel (Russia): Alexander exploring the depths of sea.

There were translations of the Alexander Romance into Old Church Slavonic.

- The Alexandria, full title being "The Kingdom of Alexander from Macedon" produced in 10th-century Bulgaria. It became part of the Chronograph (or the Chronograph-Alexandria). The Chronograph and Alexandria were never separated out into independent books.
- Old Serbian translation, so called Old Serbian Alexander Romance, written in 13th-century in Serbia was from the ultimate source of γ recension of the Greek Alexander Romance. In the 13th century, a translation from an Alexander legend either in Latin or Italian was made to produce the first Alexander Romance in the Cyrillic script. A redaction of this text in the 14th century in Dalmatia is what has come down as the Old Serbian Alexander Romance. and it went on to become the basis for adaptations of Alexander legends throughout the Balkans. By the 17th century, it was circulating in both Bulgarian and Romanian translations. The Russian Alexander Romance is also a translation of the Serbian one.
- Serbian translation, so called Serbian Alexandria, was written in Serbia and completed in the 14th-century. It is known from eleven Serbian manuscripts, the first extant one dating to the 15th-century, and follows the Greek λ recension of the Romance.
- The Alexander Romance spread into Russia from the 15th-century onwards, translated from the earlier Serbian version.
- Bosnian translation, so called Alexander of Berlin, is written in Bosnia in late 15th to beginning of the 16th century.

=== Irish ===
The Irish Alexander Romance, also known as the Imthusa Alexandair, was composed around 1100, representing the first complete vernacular version of the Romance in a European vernacular. It includes episodes such as Alexander's visit to Jerusalem, talking trees, encounters with Dindimus, and more. Two sources the author identified for his work were Orosius and Josephus.

=== Semitic languages ===
==== Arabic ====
- The story of Dhu al-Qarnayn ("The Two-Horned One") in the Quran is generally seen in tradition and among contemporary historians to represent an allusive synopsis of the Romance tradition in the way it was expressed by the Syriac Alexander Legend. The names Alexander and Dhu al-Qarnayn were widely merged in subsequent Muslim literature when describing the legends and accomplishments of the former.
- The Qissat al-Iskandar (fully the Qiṣṣat al-Iskandar wa-mā fīhā min al-amr al-ʿadjīb, or "The story of Alexander and the wonderful things it contains") is a late eighth or early ninth-century recension of the Syriac Alexander Legend composed by ‘Umara ibn Zayd (767-815).
- The Qissat Dhulqarnayn (Qissat Dhulqarnayn, "Story of Dhulqarnayn") is a Hispano-Arabic legend of Alexander the Great preserved in two fourteenth-century manuscripts in Madrid and likely dates as a ninth-century Arabic translation of the Syriac Alexander Legend produced in Al-Andalus.
- A second Qissat Dhulqarnayn containing a synopsis of the Alexander Romance is known from the eleventh-century Ara'is al-majalis fi Qisas al-anbiya' (Book of Prophets) of al-Tha'labi (d. 1036).
- A third Qissat Dhulqarnayn known from one 18th-century manuscript from Timbuktu, whose manuscript was recently edited and published in an Arabic edition and French translation by Bohas and Sinno.
- The Hadith Dhulqarnayn, like the Qissat Dhulqarnayn, is another Hispano-Arabic version of the Alexander legend. It dates to the 15th century.
- The Sīrat al-Iskandar is a 15th century Arabic popular romance about Alexander the Great. It belongs to the sīra shaʿbiyya genre.
- The Tārīkh al-Iskandar al-Makdūni (History of Alexander of Macedon), translated into Arabic by the Melkite bishop Yuwāsif ibn Suwaydān (c. 1669) from the Byzantine ζ-recension of Pseudo-Callisthenes.
- The Sirat al-malek Eskandar Dhu’ l-Qarneyn, known from one 17th century manuscript copied by Yusof Ebn-Atiye (or Qozmân).
- The Kitāb Qiṣṣat Dhīʾl-Qarnayn from Mali.

==== Ethiopic ====
An Ethiopic version of the Alexander Romance was first composed in the Geʽez language between the 14th and 16th centuries was produced as a translation of an intermediary 9th-century Arabic text of what ultimately goes back to the Syriac recension. The Ethiopic version also integrates motifs from the Syriac Alexander Legend within the Romance narrative. There are seven known Ethiopian Alexander Romances:

- The Ethiopic Alexander Romance, also known as Zēnā Eskender or the Ethiopic Pseudo-Callisthenes
- The History of Alexander by Abû Shâker
- The History of Alexander by al-Makin
- The History of Alexander by Joseph ben Gorion
- The History of the Death of Alexander by an anonymous writer
- The Christian Romance of the Life of Alexander
- The History of the Blessed Men who lived in the Days of Jeremiah the Prophet and the Account of the Vision of Abbâ Gerâsimus

==== Hebrew ====
There are three or four medieval Hebrew versions of the Alexander Romance:

- The Josippon, a 10th-century text into which a version of the Alexander Romance was interpolated into in later times.
- A literal and slightly abridged translation from the original Greek is found in the manuscript Parma, Bibliotheca I. B. de Rossi, MS Heb. 1087. This version was also partially interpolated into the Sefer Yosippon in the 10th century.
- In the 12th or 13th century, an anonymous translator or translators translated a lost Arabic translation of the Latin Historia de Preliis into Hebrew. This is found in the manuscript Paris, Bibliothèque nationale de France, MS Héb. 671.5 and London, Jews' College Library, MS 145. These may represent a single translation in different versions or else two translations, with the Paris version having been used to complete the London. The translator (or one of them) may have been Samuel ibn Tibbon, who made other translations from Arabic.
- In the 14th century Immanuel Bonfils translated the Historia de Preliis directly from Latin into Hebrew. This is found today only in the manuscript Paris, Bibliothèque nationale de France, MS Héb. 750.3, but an illuminated copy once resided in the Royal Library of Turin (c. 1880) before being destroyed in a fire.

==== Syriac ====
There are four texts in the tradition of the Alexander Romance in Syriac, and they have been often mistaken with one another. All four were translated in the same 1889 volume by E. A. Wallis Budge, though some of them have appeared in newer editions since then.

- The Syriac Alexander Romance (Tašʿītā d̄ʾAleksandrōs), A Syriac translation of the Alexander Romance of Pseudo-Callisthenes and the most influential of the Syriac versions of the Alexander legends.
- The prose Syriac Alexander Legend (Neṣḥānā d-Aleksandrōs), which may be completely independent of Pseudo-Callisthenes. The text is commonly attributed in its provenance to north Mesopotamia around 629-630 AD, shortly after Heraclius defeated the Persians, though more recent suggestions place it in the mid-6th century under Justinian I. The Syriac Legend contains additional motifs not found in the earliest Greek Romance, including the episode where Alexander builds a wall against Gog and Magog.
- The Song of Alexander, a poem spuriously attributed to Jacob of Serugh and is slightly later than the Legend. Its author is sometimes referred to as Pseudo-Jacob.
- Another prose version though shorter than the Legend.

=== Armenian ===
- The Armenian Alexander Romance, derived from the α recension of the Alexander Romance, is typically dated to the fifth century. In 1969, a translation of the Armenian recension was published by Albert Mugrdich Wolohojian.
- A second Armenian version of the Alexander Romance produced between the fourteenth to sixteenth centuries. The earliest manuscript is called San Lazzaro MS 424 (see ).

=== Coptic ===
A Coptic translation of the Romance from the Greek was already being revised in the sixth century. A fragmentary manuscript, originally 220 pages long, in the Sahidic dialect was discovered in the White Monastery. It draws on older Demotic Egyptian traditions, which existed in written form perhaps as early as 275 BC. It has been edited and published by Oscar von Lemm. Several fragments of it have been collected and translated.

=== Georgian ===
Though Georgian versions of the Alexander Romance have not survived, that they existed is known; it is thought that two versions existed. The earlier came into existence between the fourth and seventh centuries and its influence is detectable in extant Georgian texts such as The Conversion of Kartli chronicles and in The Life of Kings. The second was produced sometime between the ninth to twelfth centuries, and fragments of it were kept by the chronicler of David the Builder and by a Mongolian-era Georgian chronicler. Legends of Alexander would continue to influence varieties of Georgian literature from the twelfth to fourteenth centuries. Later, in the eighteenth century, the 18th-century king Archil II would produce a translation of a Serbian or Russian Alexander Romance into Georgian, and this one has survived.

=== Malay ===
- The Hikayat Iskandar Zulkarnain is a Malay epic describing fictional exploits of Alexander the Great (Iskandar), identified with Dhu al-Qarnayn. Its ultimate source is most likely the Arabic Sirat al-Iskandar.
- The Hikayat Raja Iskandar ("Story of King Alexander").
- The Hikayat Ya’juj wa-Ma’juj ("Story of Gog and Magog").
- A 19th-century Javanese poem.

=== Mongolian ===
- The Mongolian Alexander Romance was composed in the 13th or 14th century in the Uyghur alphabet.

=== Persian ===
- A lost Middle Persian version inferred by Theodor Nöldeke as the source of the Syriac Alexander Romance, perhaps produced in the 4th century by an anonymous Christian writer in the Sasanian Empire, though the existence of this text has been disputed.
- Alexander the Great's representation in the Shahnameh, an epic of Persian kings composed by Ferdowsi. It involves a lengthy story about Alexander which acts as the bridge-point between the mythological to historical realms of Ferdowsi's larger narrative.
- The Iskandarnameh (Book of Alexander), an anonymous text dated to between the 11th and 14th centuries.
- The Iskandarnameh of Nizami Ganjavi, composed before 1194.
- The Dârâb-nâme of Mohammad b. Hasan b. Ali b. Musâ Abu-Tâher Tarsusi (or Tartusi), written by the 12th century.
- The Ayina-i Iskandari (Alexandrine Mirror) of Amir Khusrow, completed in 1299/1300 during the reign of Muhammad II of Khwarazm.
- The Kherad-nâme (Book of Alexandrian Intelligence) of Jâmi composed in the 15th century.
- The Ayina-i Iskandari of Ahli Shirazi, completed in 1543.
- The Qissa-ye Dhuʾl Qarnayn (Story of the Two-Horned One) of Badri Kashmiri, composed in 1580.
- The Iskandarnameh of Sanai Mashhadi (d. 1588).
- The Sekandar-nâme (or Sadd-e Sekandar, or Bâgh-e Eram) of Khâje Hoseyn Thanâʾi Mashhadi (d. 1587).
- The Eskandar-nâme-ye-haft-jeldi (Alexander of the Storytellers) compiled by Manuchehr Hakim, who is potentially to be identified with the 17th century Safavid prince Manuchehr Qare-chaqâi Khân. This figure may be the patron or author of the text.
- Several more Persian Alexander romances are only known by name as attested in bibliographical inventories, brief allusions in some scholarly works, manuscript catalogues, and literary histories. These include the Eskandar-nâme by Kamâl-al-Din Hoseyn Esfahâni (16th c.), the Eskandar-nâme by Hasan-Beyg Atâbi Takallu (d. 1616), the Sekandar-nâme-ye-jabali (completed in India in 1729), and the Eskandar-nâme of Nâseri Kermâni (dating to 1850).

=== Turkish ===
- The İskendernâme of Taceddin Ahmedi is the oldest surviving work of Ottoman historiography. It is usually thought to have been composed between 1402 and 1411 and is dedicated to Emir Suleyman.
- The İskendernâme composed by Ahmedi's brother, Hamzavī.
- The of İskendernâme of Ahmed Redvan, completed in 1499 and inspired by the earlier version of Ahmedi.
- The Sadd-i Iskandarī (Alexander's Wall) (15th century) of Ali-Shir Nava'i is the only Alexander legend composed in Chagatai Turkish.
- The Qiṣaṣ-i Rabghūzī (Eastern Turkish Stories of the Prophets) is a 16th-century manuscript containing six stories about Alexander.

== See also ==
- Alexander the Great in legend
- Ethiopic Alexander Romance
- Gates of Alexander
- Horns of Alexander
- Letters of Alexander the Great

== Translations ==
- Bürgel, J. Christoph, Nizami. Das Alexanderbuch, Munich: Manesse, 1991.
- Favager, D.J. (translator) The Romance of Alexander of Alexandre de Paris (abbreviated translation) Kindle (2021)
- Harf-Lancner, Laurence (translator and commentator, edited by Armstrong and al.). Le roman d'Alexandre, Livre de poche, 1994. ISBN 2-253-06655-9.
- Southgate, Minoo (translator). Iskandarnamah: a Persian medieval Alexander-romance. New York: Columbia Univ. Press, 1978. ISBN 0-231-04416-X.
- Stoneman, Richard (editor and translator). The Greek Alexander Romance. New York: Penguin, 1991. ISBN 0-14-044560-9.
- Wolohojian, A. H. The Romance of Alexander the Great by Pseudo-Callisthenes (from the Armenian). Columbia University Press, 1969.
- Budge, Sir Ernest Alfred Wallis, ed. (1889). The History of Alexander the Great, Being the Syriac Version. Vol. II. Cambridge University Press.
