= Libro de Alexandre =

13th-century Spanish epic poem

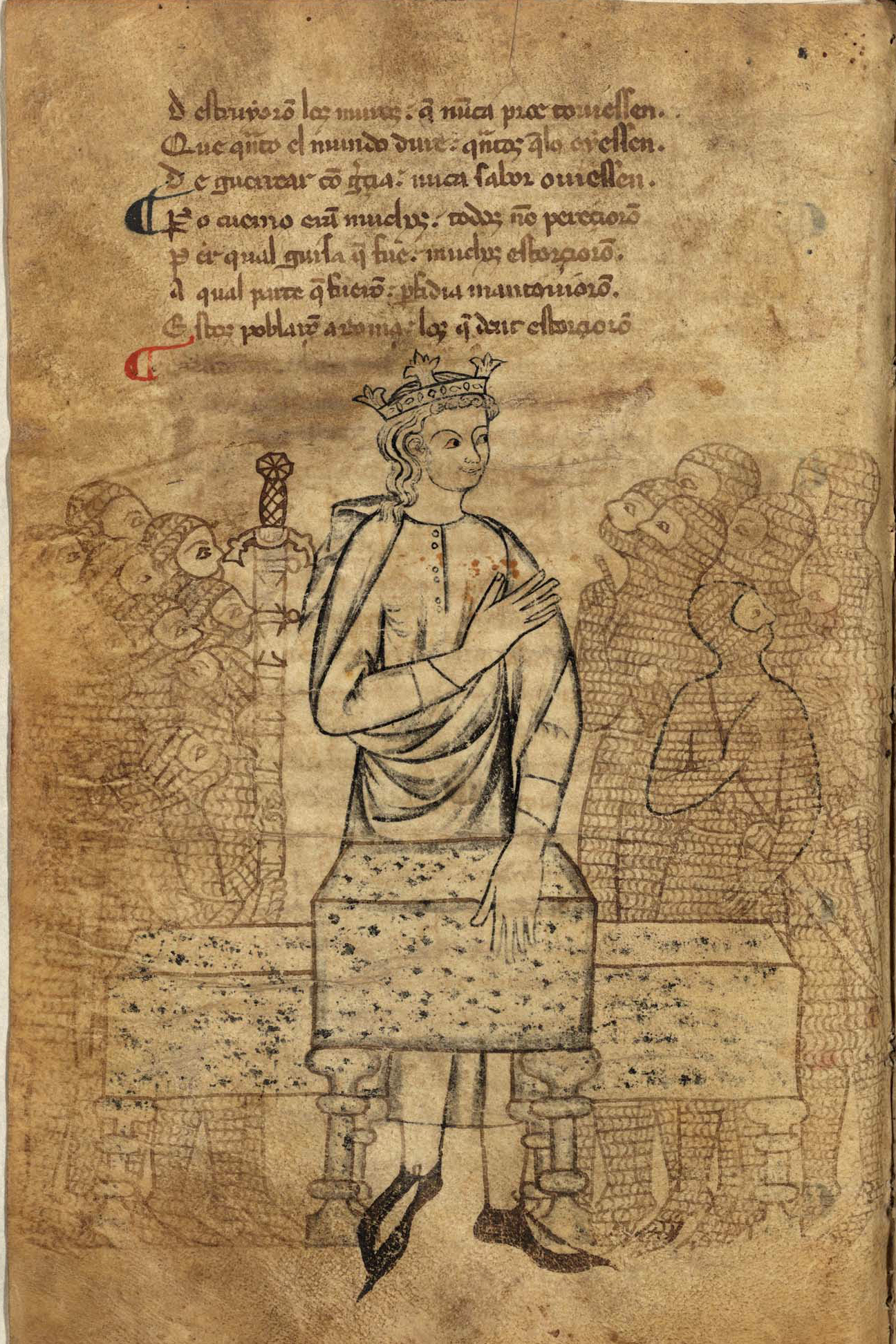
- Folio 45v from Manuscript O, depicting Alexander the Great seated among his warriors.
- Author: Unknown (historically attributed to Juan Lorenzo de Astorga or Gonzalo de Berceo)
- Language: Old Spanish
- Genre: Epic poetry, romance
- Set in: Antiquity
- Publication date: c. 1200–1250
- Publication place: Kingdom of Castile / Kingdom of León
- Media type: Manuscript
- Pages: 2,675 stanzas

The Libro de Alexandre is a medieval Spanish epic poem about Alexander the Great written between 1178 and c. 1250 in the mester de clerecía. It is largely based on the Alexandreis of Walter of Châtillon, but also contains many fantastical elements common to the Alexander romance. It consists of 2,675 stanzas of cuaderna vía and 10,700 lines.

The Libro is preserved in two manuscripts, called P and O, neither of which appears to be an original. There are as well three fragments preserved in separate manuscripts. Manuscript O is the earlier, copied around 1300, and includes 2,510 stanzas of cuaderna vía and two epistles. It was once owned by the Duke of Osuna (whence O) and was known to Íñigo López de Mendoza, 1st Marquess of Santillana. P, from Paris, was copied in the fifteenth century and contains 2,639 stanzas. It is generally more reliable and together the two manuscripts make a coherent whole. R. S. Willis Jr., produced an edition of both manuscripts where a page from O faces the corresponding page from P, with fragments noted at the bottom, so that one reading can readily be corrected by the other text. O is generally considered to be from eastern Castile, while P was copied in western Castile. The fragment G′ is named after Gutierre Díez de Gamés, who included stanzas from the first part of the Libro in his early fifteenth-century Victorial.

The date of composition is uncertain. However, it must postdate 1178, the earliest year when Walter completed the Alexandreis, and predate 1250, the approximate date of the Poema de Fernán González, which it influences. Some scholars have fixed the date as between 1202 and 1207. Besides the Alexandreis, the author of the Libro claimed many sources. In his own words: el uno que leyemos, el otro que oyemos / de las mayores cosas Recabdo vos daremos ("the one that we read, the other that we hear / of the greatest things collected we give you"). These sources include the Historia de proeliis of Leo of Naples and several ancient authorities, including Leo's source, Quintus Curtius, Flavius Josephus, and the Pindarus Thebanus. The work of Isidore of Seville and the Old French Roman d'Alexandre were also consulted.

Structurally the Libro is a chronological story of Alexander's life set between an introduction in six stanzas and a conclusion in seven. There are digressions and authorial displays of erudition, but the narrative, from birth to death, is logical and smooth. The problem of authorship is unresolved. It has been variously attributed to Juan Lorenzo de Astorga (sometimes thought to be merely a scribe), Alfonso X of Castile, and Gonzalo de Berceo.

Following is a sample text from the Libro, with translations in Modern Spanish and English. This fragment sums up the fall of Alexander because of his pride.

La Natura que cria toda-las creaturas las que son paladinas e las que son escuras tuuo que Alexandre dixo paraulas duras que querie conquerir las secretas naturas Tuuo la rrica donna que era subiugada que queria el toller la rryna condonada de su poder non fura nunca tan desarrada se non que Alexandre l·auia aontada Enas cosas secretas quiso el saber que nunca omne uiuo las pudo entender quiso-las Alexandre por forçia connoçer nunca mayor soberuia comedio Luçifer Auia-le Dios dado los regnos en so poder non se le podia forçias nenguna defender querie saber los mares los enfiernos ueer lo que nunca pudo omne nenguno acabeçer Peso al Criador que crio la Natura ouo de Alexandre sanna e grant rancura dixo este lunatico que non cata mesura yo·l tornare el gozo todo en amargura.	La Natura que cría todas las criaturas las que son claras y las que son oscuras pensó que Alejandro dijo palabras duras que quería conquistar las secretas naturas Creyó la rica dueña que era subyugada que quería quitarle la ley condonada [mas] de su poder no fuera nunca desheredada ni aun por Alejandro sería afrentada En las cosas secretas quiso él saber aquello que ningún hombre vivo pudo entender quísolas Alejandro por fuerza conocer ¡Nunca mayor soberbia cometió Lucifer! Habíale Dios dado los reinos en su poder no se le podia fuerza ninguna exceder quería conocer los mares [y] los infiernos ver lo que no pudo hombre nunca acometer Pesó al Creador que creó la Natura [y] tuvo contra Alejandro saña y gran rancura [dijo]: «este lunático que no acata mesura yo le tornaré el gozo todo en amargura».	Nature, which nurtures all creatures, Both the noble and the lowly, Thought that Alexander said imposing words That he wanted to capture the secrets of nature The Lady thought herself captive That he wanted to usurp her standing law Never dispossessed of a power not even Alexander could oppose Alexander sought by any means, In secret things, he wanted to understand that which no man alive could ever come to know nor Lucifer, in all his pride. The God-given kingdoms were his to rule No might was greater He wanted to chart the seas and feel the infernos What no man could ever brave The Creator burdened by His nature Harbored great malice And said: "This lunatic who knows no bounds All his joy I will embitter".
