= Ayina-i Iskandari =

Ayina-i Iskandari may refer to:

- Ayina-i-Iskandari (Amir Khusrau), a Persian legend of the life and exploits of Alexander the Great composed by the poet Amir Khusrau (d. 1325), completed in 1299/1300
- Ayina-i-Iskandari (Ahli Shirazi), a Persian courtly version of the Alexander Romance literature, completed in 1543

== See also ==
- Sadd-i Iskandari
