= Epistola Alexandri ad Aristotelem =

Purported letter from Alexander the Great

Aristotle (left) receiving the letter of Alexander (right), from the Picard Epistola (early 14th-century manuscript)

Latin Epistola (12th-century manuscript)

Arabic Epistola (16th-century manuscript)

The last page of the Wonders of the East (left) and the first page of the Old English Epistola (right), from the Nowell Codex

The Epistola Alexandri ad Aristotelem ("Letter of Alexander to Aristotle") is a purported letter from Alexander the Great to the philosopher Aristotle concerning his adventures in India. Although accepted for centuries as genuine, it is today regarded as apocryphal. It is the primary source for most of the tales of the marvellous and fabulous found in later Alexander traditions.

It is classified as one of the Indian tractates.

== Textual history ==
The Epistola was composed in Greek. The original version may have adhered more closely to historical fact than later versions. An abridged version, including much fabulous material, was incorporated into Pseudo-Callisthenes' Alexander Romance no later than the third century AD. In the Greek alpha recension of the Romance, the letter is chapter 17 of book III. The Epistola was widely translated and circulated both with the various versions of the Romance and independently of it. In some later Greek recensions of the Romance, the letter is switched from the first person to the third person (losing the character of a letter) and melded seamlessly into the narrative.

Julius Valerius most likely made the first translation of the letter into Latin. Around 310, he partially incorporated it into his Latin translation of the Romance. Valerius' version of the Epistola had a limited circulation independent of the Romance in southern Germany in the 13th century. A fuller translation into Latin was made sometime between the 4th and 7th centuries. It has been called Epistola I. This version also circulated independently of the Romance and is found in at least 190 manuscripts, but never illustrated. The Zacher Epitome, a heavily abridged version of Valerius' translation of the Romance with the letter excised, was usually accompanied by the full translation of the letter in the manuscripts. Sometime before 1000, a revised version of the Latin Epistola was produced. Its Latin is less polished. It circulated alongside Leo of Naples's translation of the Romance. It is called Epistola II. A further abridged version was incorporated in the interpolated versions of Leo, known collectively as the Historia de preliis.

The first vernacular translation in western Europe was made into Old English and interpolated into Alfred the Great's translation of Orosius in the tenth century. It is preserved in the Nowell Codex. The original translation was in the Mercian dialect, but the surviving version is West Saxon. It is based on Epistola I and survives in at least 28 manuscripts. A separate Middle English translation was made between about 1250 and 1300 for the romance King Alisaunder. In addition, the Epistola was twice translated into Old Irish. There are two translations into Old French, one into the Anglo-Norman dialect and one into Picard. There is an Old Norse version from Iceland (14th century) based on Epistola I. An Italian version appears in a fifteenth-century manuscript. Gabriel Rollenhagen published a German translation of Epistola I in 1603.

The eastern tradition of the Epistola stems from a Syriac translation of the Romance. Not all derivative versions retain the letter, however. It is absent in the Armenian. Two translations from Syriac into Arabic were made in the ninth century. Although one of these translations is lost, its version of the Epistola was incorporated into a separate, popular romance about Alexander, the Sīrat al-Iskandar. Material derived from the Arabic Epistola can also be found, no longer in the form of a letter, in the Persian Shahnameh and Iskandarnameh. The Epistola or material from it entered Ethiopic and Turkish through translations of the Romance and Iskandarnameh, respectively.

== Synopsis ==
The letter begins with Alexander's attack on the Indian king Porus in July 326 BC. Alexander describes the palace of Porus and his trip to the Caspian Gates. He then passes through a sandy wasteland. His guides are unreliable. He encounters a river of unpotable water. When he notices a castle of reeds on an island in the river, he orders some men to swim to it, but they are killed by hippopotamuses. He then orders the guides to swim it, but they too are eaten. Some Indians from the island approach in a boat and lead Alexander to a freshwater lake. He and his men pitch camp there.

Beside the lake, the army suffers the "Night of Terrors". The camp is repeatedly attacked by strange beasts. First, large snakes and giant crabs, followed in succession by giant white lions, giant pigs, giant bats and the beast called Odontotyrannus, which is "larger than an elephant, with three horns on its forehead." It kills dozens of men. The army is then attacked by large shrews and red vultures with black beaks. At dawn, they strike camp.

Following the "Night of Terrors", the army continues the campaign against Porus and his war elephants. They face stormy weather and find Liber Pater sleeping in a cave. They visit the oracle of the "Trees of Sun and Moon", which predict Alexander's premature death. They then enter a valley containing snakes with emeralds in their necks. The letter ends with Alexander announcing that he has built two tall statues in Babylon and Persepolis containing an account of his feast in India.

== See also ==
- Letters of Alexander the Great

== Bibliography ==
- Behrens, Jörn Martin (2007). The Old English 'Epistola Alexandri Ad Aristotelem': The Letter in its Christian Context. GRIN Verlag.
- Cary, George (1956). The Medieval Alexander. Cambridge University Press.
- DiMarco, Vincent; Perelman, Leslie (1978). The Middle English Letter of Alexander to Aristotle. Rodopi.
- Doufikar-Aerts, Faustina (2010). "A Letter in Bits and Pieces: The Epistola Alexandri ad Aristotelem Arabica. A First Edition with Translation Based on Four 16th–18th-century Manuscripts". In R. Kerr; T. Milo (eds.). Writings and Writing from Another World and Another Era in Honour of J. J. Witkam. Archetype. pp. 91–115.
- Doufikar-Aerts, Faustina (2016). "A Hero Without Borders: 2 Alexander the Great in the Syriac and Arabic Tradition". In Carolina Cupane; Bettina Krönung (eds.). Fictional Storytelling in the Medieval Eastern Mediterranean and Beyond. Brill. pp. 190–209.
- Gunderson, Lloyd L. (1980). Alexander's Letter to Aristotle about India. Hain.
- Kim, Susan M. (2017). "Letter of Alexander to Aristotle". In Siân Echard; Robert Rouse (eds.). The Encyclopedia of Medieval Literature in Britain. Vol. 3. John Wiley & Sons. pp. 1174–1176. doi:10.1002/9781118396957.wbemlb138. ISBN 9781118396988.
- Knock, Ann Elizabeth (1982). Wonders of the East: A Synoptic Edition of the Letter of Pharasmanes and the Old English and Old Picard Translations (PDF) (PhD dissertation). University of London.
- Pitts, Brent A., ed. (2019). Lettre d'Alexandre sur les Merveilles de l'Inde (Cambridge, Fitzwilliam Museum, CFM 20). Anglo-Norman Text Society.
- Powell, Kathryn (2013). "Alexander the Great, Letter to Aristotle". In Michael Lapidge; John Blair; Simon Keynes; Donald Scragg (eds.). The Wiley Blackwell Encyclopedia of Anglo-Saxon England. John Wiley & Sons. p. 29. doi:10.1002/9781118316061.ch1.
- Rypins, Stanley I. (1923). "The Old English Epistola Alexandri ad Aristotelem". Modern Language Notes. 38 (4): 216–220. doi:10.2307/2914684. JSTOR 2914684.
- Stoneman, Richard (1991). The Greek Alexander Romance. Penguin Books. ISBN 9780140445602.
- Stoneman, Richard (2011). "Primary Sources from the Classical and Early Medieval Periods". In Z. David Zuwiyya (ed.). A Companion to Alexander Literature in the Middle Ages. Brill. pp. 1–20.
- Voorbij, J. B. (1996). "Medieval Dossiers and Modern Stemmas: An Exploration of Manuscripts of the Epistola Alexandri ad Aristotelem". In Pieter van Reenen; Margot van Mulken (eds.). Studies in Stemmatology. John Benjamins Publishing Company. pp. 209–232.
