= Alexander the Great in the Shahnameh =

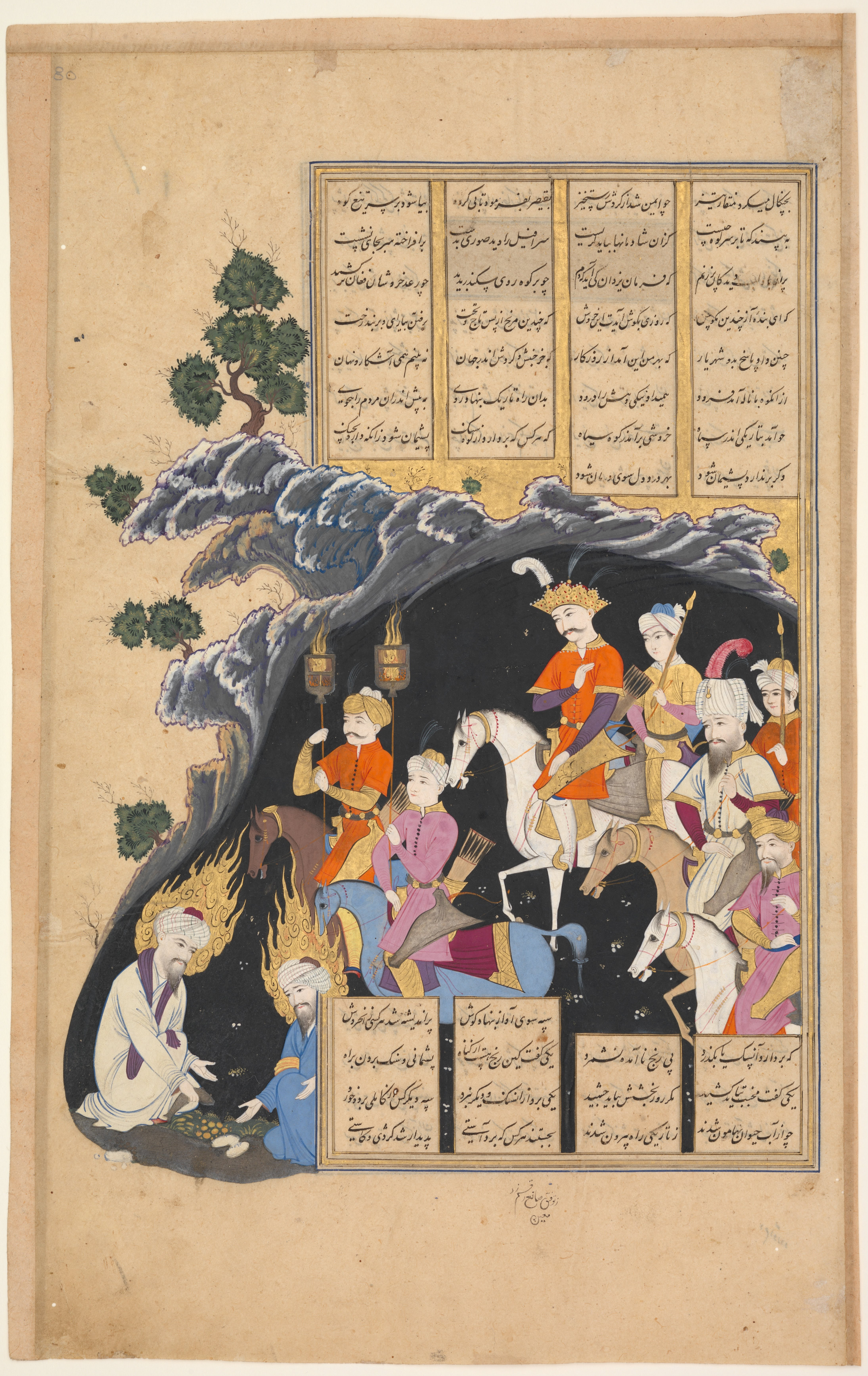
Iskandar (Alexander) in the Land of Darkness passing by the Water of Life at the edge of which sit his guides Khidr and Ilyas. From a c. 1650 Shahnameh illustrated by Mo'en Mosavver.

The eleventh-century Shahnameh of Ferdowsi (d. 1020) preserves the earliest version of the Alexander Romance in the Persian language, following closely the text in its Syriac translation. The Romance genre functioned to preserve and describe the legends and exploits of Alexander the Great. Although the Shahnameh is a much larger text and contains legends of many other rulers of Persia, three consecutive sections of it cover Alexander (whom the text refers to as Sikandar), amounting to roughly 2,500 verses. Furthermore, the sections about Alexander act as a bridge between the narratives of the kings before and after him, representing a transition from a realm of mythological kings and exploits to the historical kings of the Sasanian Empire.

The Shahnameh is much less polemical towards Alexander as compared with representations in the pre-Islamic Sasanian Empire. Nevertheless, negative portrayals of Alexander from this period have influenced the Shahnameh.

== Synopsis ==
The first two sections describe the birth of Alexander, his ascent to the Macedonian throne, and then his wars against Dara II (identified with Darius III) in which he emerges victorious and conquers Persia. In the story, Alexander is represented as a legitimate heir to the Persian throne by virtue of his half-brotherhood to Dara II, and so is a legitimate descendant of the legendary Kayanian dynasty rather than a foreign conqueror.

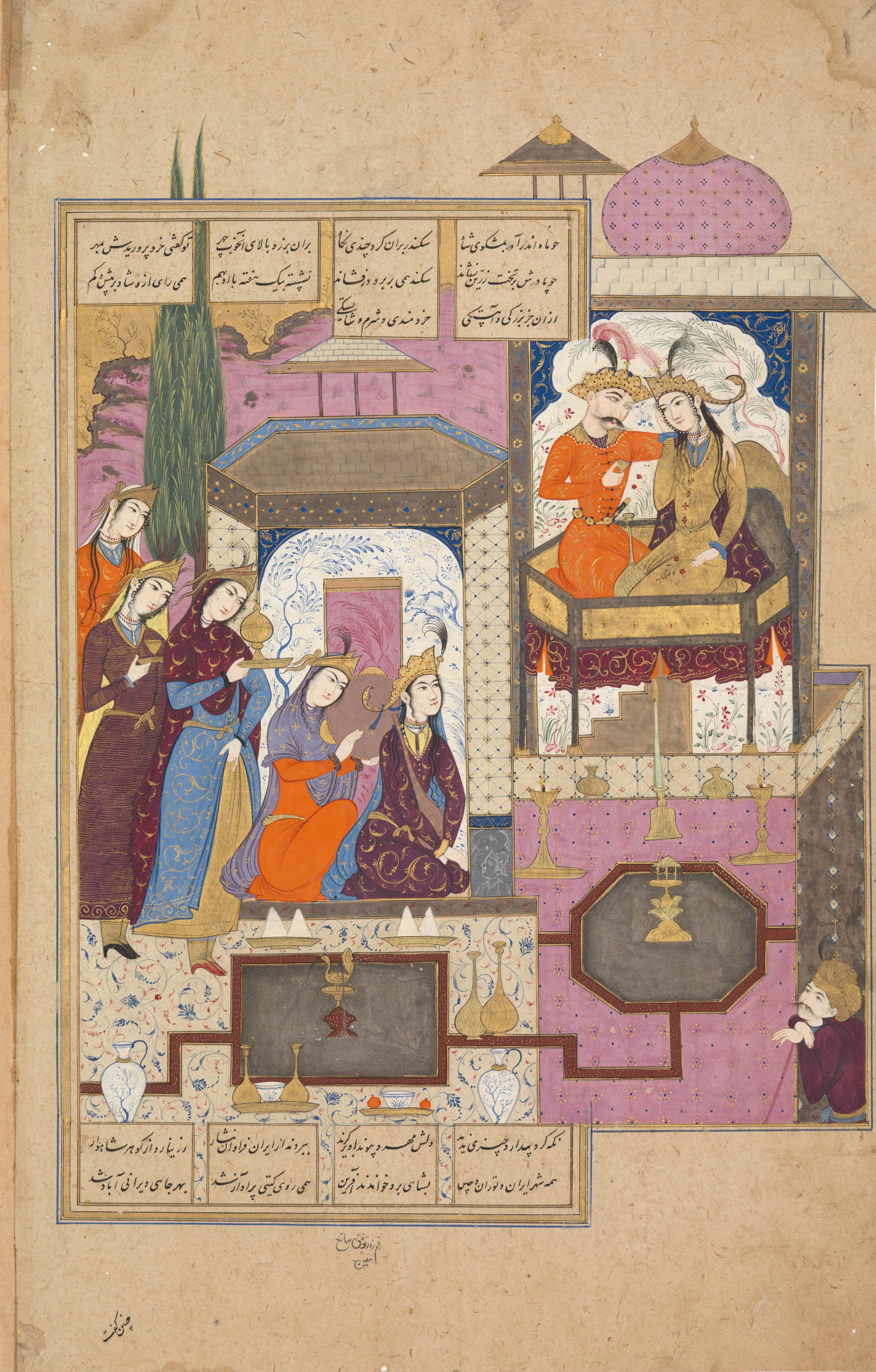
Iskandar marries Roshanak. From a c. 1650 Shahnameh illustrated by Mo'en Mosavver.

In the third section, Alexander conquers the entire world and is in a search in pursuit of the Fountain of Youth. This part describes his war against the domain of the Indian king, a pilgrimage to Mecca, his journeys through Egypt and meeting with Qeydâfe, the queen of al-Andalus (who represents the equivalent to the Ethiopian Kandake in the original Greek Romance). He also reaches the Land of Amazons and the Land of Darkness. In the latter, he searches for the Fountain of Life. He erects a barrier against Gog and Magog in the east. Over the course of his journeys, he receives repeated and stronger hints of his coming death. Eventually, he dies in Iraq, after having sent a letter to his mother containing instructions about how to proceed with affairs after his enclosing demise.

== Sources and influence ==
It is thought that most of the episodes of Alexander in the Shahnameh rely on an Arabic intermediary of the Syriac Alexander Romance, which itself is now thought to be a translation of the original Alexander Romance into Syriac. The representation of Alexander in the Shahnameh had a profound influence on the subsequent Alexander romance literature in Persian, including on the Iskandarnama of Nizami Ganjavi, the Ayina-i Iskandari of Amir Khusrau, and others.

According to historian Haila Manteghi, Ferdowsi's conception of Alexander in the Shahnameh was based on an earlier pre-Islamic source of the Hellenic leader, before it had mixed with the Dhu'lqarnain. In this framing, Alexander is described in the epic as gojastak (lit. cursed, hateful), based on a Pahlavi text (a letter written by Khosrow II to the Qeisar-e Rūm). The Shahnameh's depiction of Alexander also has multiple details not found in the Greek or Syriac versions of his story, marking a departure in Ferdowsi's depiction of Alexander from other sources, and therefore producing a distinctly Persian version of the figure. Other terms and names related to Alexander in the Shahnameh have a distinctly ancient meaning, alluding to the unique Persian experience with Alexander, rather than borrowing information for the story from other chronicles.

== See also ==
- Alexander the Great in Islamic tradition
- Qissat al-Iskandar
