= Al-Suri =

Al-Suri is a surname. Notable people with the surname include:

- Abū Isḥāq Ibrahīm ibn Mufarrij al-Ṣūrī (fl. 15th century), author of the Sīrat al-Iskandar
- Mustafa Setmariam Nasar (born 1958), called Abu Musab al-Suri, member of al-Qaeda
