= Zephyrus (soldier) =

Apocryphal soldier of Alexander the Great

Zephyrus (Greek: Ζέφυρος), according to the apocryphal Letter to Aristotle 14, was the soldier, who brought Alexander the Great a helmet full of water when the army was suffering greatly in the Gedrosian desert (325 BC). The famous story of how Alexander poured the water into the ground in front of the army is told by a number of sources but the name Zephyrus (western wind) appears to have been invented.
