= Hermann Zotenberg =

German-born French orientalist and Arabist (1836-1894)

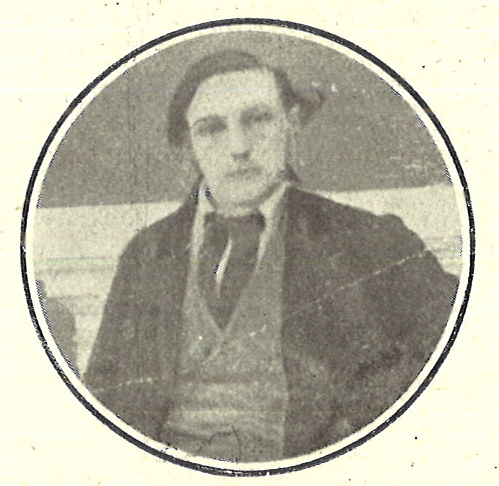
Hermann Zotenberg

Hermann Zotenberg (1836, Silesia – 1894, Paris) was an orientalist and Arabist.

He worked for the Bibliothèque nationale de France in Paris. His most celebrated work is his edition of the Chronique de Tabari (Paris, 1867–1871)

== Works ==
- CHRONIQUE DE JEAN, EVEQUE DE NIKIOU (ክብረ ነገሥት Kebra Nagast, or "the Glory of the Kings”.),
- Chronique de Tabari / Abū-Ǧaʿfar Muḥammad Ibn-Ǧarīr Ibn-Yāzid aṭ- Ṭabarī, Paris 1867–1871. (reprinted Paris, Maisonneuve 1958, 4 volumes)
- Charles, Robert Henry: The chronicle of John (c. 690 A.D.) : coptic bishop of Nikiu : being a history of Egypt before and during †the Arab conquest. Translated from Hermann Zotenberg's edition of the Ethiopic version, with an introduction, critical and linguistic notes, and an index of names [by] Robert Henry Charles, London 1916, (reprinted Amsterdam, APA/Philo 1981, ISBN 90-6022-303-9)
- Notice sur le livre de Barlaam et Joasaph : accompagnée d'extraits du texte grec et des versions arabe et éthiopienne, Paris, Impr. Nationale 1886
- Catalogue des manuscrits arabes / William MacGuckin de Slane. — Paris, Impr. Nationale 1883-1895
- Catalogues des manuscrits syriaques et sabéens (Mandaïtes) de la bibliothèque nationale / Jules Antoine Taschereau. — (1874)
- Chronique de Abou-Djafar-Moʿhammed-Ben-Djarir-Ben-Yezid Tabari / Abū-Ǧaʿfar Muḥammad Ibn-Ǧarīr Ibn-Yazīd aṭ- Ṭabarī. — Paris, Imprimerie Impériale 1867-1871 (3 volumes)
- Gui de Cambrai: Barlaam und Josaphat : französisches Gedicht des dreizehnten Jahrhunderts; nebst Auszügen aus mehreren andern romanischen Versionen, ed. by Hermann Zotenberg and Paul Meyer. Stuttgart, Litterarischer Verein 1864 (Bibliothek des Litterarischen Vereins in Stuttgart; 75) (reprinted Amsterdam 1966)
- Tabari: Mohammed, sceau des prophetes. Extrait de la Chronique de Tabari, traduit par Hermann Zotenberg, préfacée par Jacques Berque. Coll.: La Bibliothèque de l'Islam. Collections editees par Pierre Bernard. Paris Sindbad 1980; ISBN 2-7274-0088-8
- (Ed. & translator): Histoire des rois des Perses par Abou Mansour 'abd Al-Malik ibn Mohammad ibn Isma'il al-Tha'alibi : historien et philologue arabe de la Perse (A.H. 350-430) : texte arabe, 1900, (reprinted Amsterdam, Apa-Oriental Press 1979 ISBN 90-6023-160-0)
- Invasions des Visigoths et des arabes en France. Extrait du Tome II de l'Histoire Generale du Languedoc. Toulouse 1876.
- Histoire d' 'Alâ Al-Dîn ou la Lampe Merveilleuse. Texte Arabe publié avec une notice sur quelques manuscrits des Mille et une Nuits par H. Zotenberg, roy. 8vo. Paris, Imprimérie Nationale, 1888.
