= Iskandarnama =

The Iskandarnama (Note: Less commonly written Eskandarnameh or Iskandarnameh, after the modern Iranian Persian pronunciation (Eskandarnâme).) (Classical Persian: اسکندرنامه Iskandarnāma, lit. 'Book of Alexander') is the oldest Persian recension of the Alexander Romance tradition, anonymous and dated to some time between the eleventh and fourteenth centuries, although recently its compilation has been placed in the eleventh century by Evangelos Venetis, during the reign of Mahmud of Ghazni in the court of the Ghaznavid Empire. Alexander is described as a Muslim king and prophet and is identified with the conqueror named Dhu'l-Qarnayn in the Quran. This identification is also witnessed in the Arabic recensions of the Alexander romance, such as the Qissat al-Iskandar and the Qissat Dhi'l-Qarnayn. As such, he is double-horned and builds the famous Gates of Alexander against Gog and Magog.

The composition of the Iskandarnama was influenced by earlier Persian compositions, such as the Shahnameh of Ferdowsi.

== Manuscripts ==
The Iskandarnama is known through one manuscript, located in the private collection of Sa‘īd Nafīsī in Tehran. The manuscript was likely composed between the fourteenth and fifteenth centuries.

The initial and final part of the known manuscript is missing. Various clear erasures and rewritings are present. The copyist claims that the writer of his own original antigraph (Abd-al-Kâfi ebn-Abi’l-Barakât) had access to several copies of the text, including the original.

== Dating ==
Mahmud of Ghazni is explicitly mentioned by the text, thus providing a terminus post quem for the composition of the text at minimum. One of the named copyists in the tradition may be known, Ebn-Abi’l-Barakât, who is known to have lived in the 12th century, thus providing a terminus ante quem for the dating of the text as well.

== Scholarship ==
An edited version of the manuscript was published by Īraj Afshār first in 1964, and then again in 2008 to correct weaknesses in the earlier edition. The first substantial academic work done on the Iskandarnama text by William Hanaway, published in his PhD dissertation in 1970. Alongside the Iskandarnama, he studied four other pre-Safavid works of Persian prose romances: the Dārābnāma, Fīrūzshāhnāma, Samak-i ʿayyār, and the Qissa-yi Hamza. Subsequently, only sporadic papers or encyclopedic entries have been published on the work, including those by Southgate, Rubanovich, and Hanaway. The work was also the subject of the 2006 dissertation of Venetis, who published the first English translation of the work in 2017.

== Translations ==
In 1978, Minoo Southgate produced an abridged (partial) English translation encompassing one fifth of the original text. The first complete English translation of the text was published by Venetis in 2017.

== See also ==
- Alexander Romance
- Qissat Dhi'l-Qarnayn
- Shahnameh
