= Ayina-i Iskandari (Ahli Shirazi) =

The Ayina-i Iskandari (Alexandrine Mirror) of Ahli Shirazi is a Persian courtly version of the Alexander Romance literature, completed in 1543.

The Ayina-i Iskandari was influenced by earlier Persian compositions about Alexander, including the Iskandarnameh of Nizami Ganjavi and even moreso an earlier text of the same name, the Ayina-i Iskandari of Amir Khusrau composed in the 13th century. It is roughly 2,300 verses in length and was dedicated to Tahmasp I, the mid-16th century Safavid Shah of Iran.

== Synopsis ==
The work is divided into two sections (daftar). The first is much longer than the second, running 1,757 verses long. It revolves around the clash and subsequent peace between Alexander and the Khagan of China. Alexander's world conquest and journeys are quickly summarized as well, and then a love story between Alexander and the Chinese Amazon, following Amir Khusrau's representation. The second section is devoted to describing how Alexander protected the arts (including engineering, architecture, painting, and so on), erects a barrier against Gog and Magog (in the Islamic tradition of corresponding Alexander with the figure named Dhu al-Qarnayn in the Quran), builds a fortified city and oversees a contest between Chinese and Rumi painters. The painting competition is a version of an earlier story that first appears in an Arabic work known as the Ehyâ’ olum al-din by Al-Ghazali (d. 1111). In the final section, Alexander destroys pagan Greece and only Plato, Heraclides, and the physician Hippocrates survive. In the account of Amir Khusrau, the same occurs, except Porphyry survives in the place of Hippocrates.

== Editions ==
- Abdi Beyg Shirâzi, Âyin-e Eskandari, ed. Abu’l-Fâzl Hâshem Rahimov (Moscow, 1977)

== See also ==
- Alexander the Great in Islamic tradition
