= Ibn Mufarrij =

Ibn Mufarrij may refer to:

- Mawhub ibn Mansur ibn Mufarrij, continuator of the History of the Patriarchs of Alexandria
- Abū Isḥāq Ibrahīm ibn Mufarrij al-Ṣūrī, author of the Sīrat al-Iskandar
