= Ahli Shirazi =

Persian poet (1454–1535)

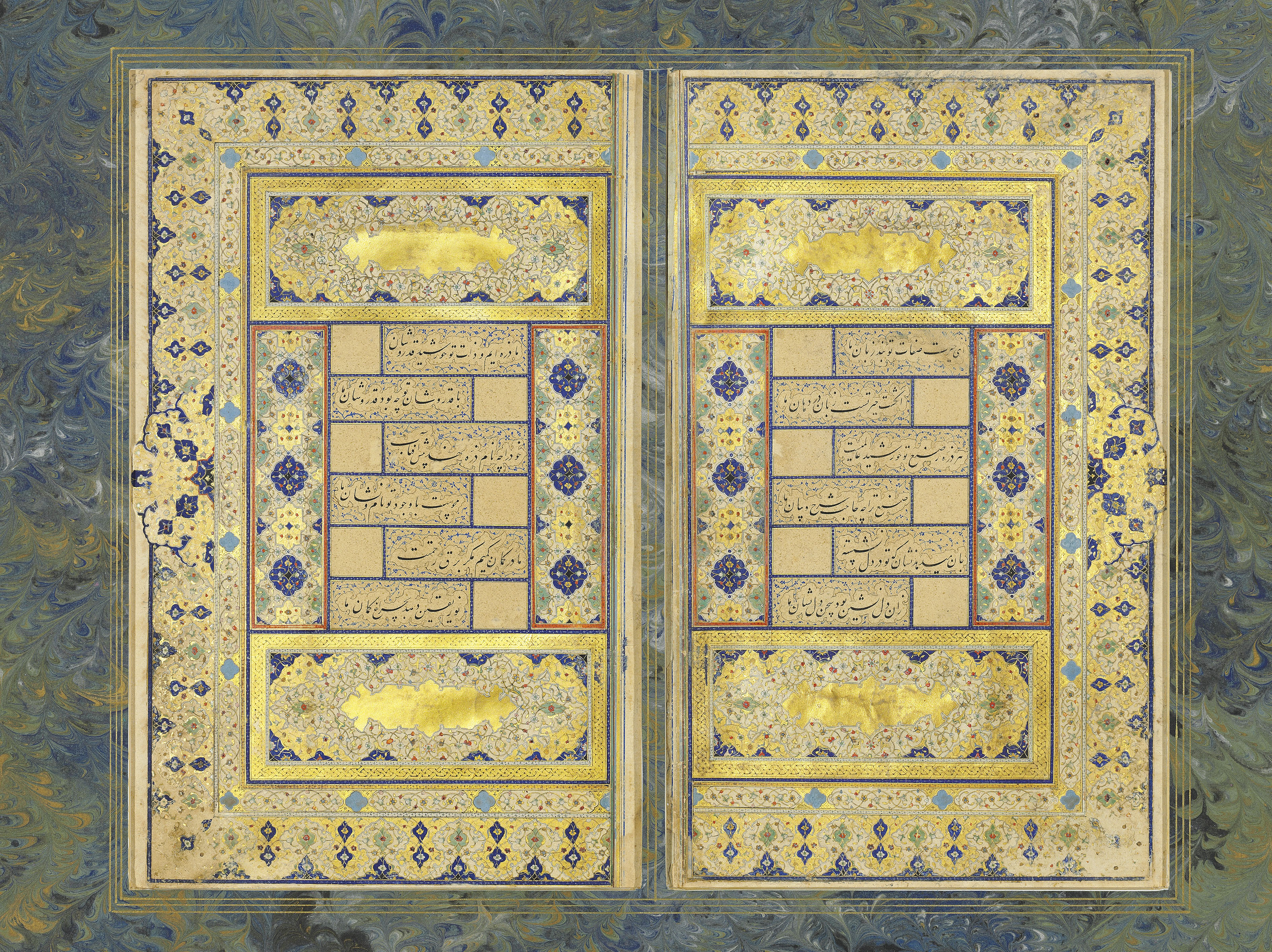
Frontispiece of an early copy of Ahli Shirazi's divan. Created in Safavid Iran and dated 1581–82, this copy was written within 50 years of Ahli Shirazi's death. The particularly fine illumination of this frontispiece suggests that this copy was created for a princely patron.

Ahli Shirazi (Persian: اهلی شیرازی), full name Muhammad ibn Yusuf Ahli Shirazi, was a Persian poet who lived in Shiraz, Iran, from circa 1454 to 1535. He is buried in Hafezieh.

It is said that his life style was retiring, he faced poverty, and his life was filled with struggle.

Ahli Shirazi excelled especially in elaborately ingenious word plays (tajnisat) and other rhetorical devices. His works include ghazals, qasidas, robais (quatrains), and other types. One ornamental ode imitates a famous rhetorical piece by Salman Savaji and was judged more successful than Salman's original; but Lotf Ali Beg commented that such rhetorical devices are not the stuff of which true poetry is made. Of Ahli's masnavis an allegory on love entitled Šam o parvane (completed in 1489) is interesting for its treatment not only of the standard suffering of the lover (moth), but also of the affection that the beloved (candle) develops for the suffering lover, only for the two to be parted by "cruel fate" through the agency of the wind.

The 18th- and 19th-century Iranian poet Shurideh Shirazi is a descendant of Ahli Shirazi.

== Sources ==
- Lingwood, Chad (2013). Politics, Poetry, and Sufism in Medieval Iran: New Perspectives on Jāmī’s Salāmān va Absāl. Brill. ISBN 978-9004254046.
- Rahman, Munibur (1995). "S̲h̲ūrīda, Muḥammad Taḳī". In Bosworth, C. E.; van Donzel, E.; Heinrichs, W. P. & Lecomte, G. (eds.). The Encyclopaedia of Islam, Second Edition. Volume VIII: Ned–Sam. Leiden: E. J. Brill. ISBN 978-90-04-09834-3.
