= Ayina-i Iskandari (Amir Khusrau) =

13th-century Persian legend of Alexander

The Ayina-i Iskandarī (Alexandrine Mirror) is a Persian legend of the life and exploits of Alexander the Great composed by the poet Amir Khusrau (d. 1325), completed in 1299/1300 during the reign of Muhammad II of Khwarazm. It is presented in the form of 35 discourses, running at 4,416 verses in the 1977 edition of the text produced by Jamâl Mirsaydof. Like his predecessor Nizami Ganjavi, Amir Khusrau's Alexander legend formed the fourth part of his Khamsa (a collection of five of his major works), and it was the first response to Nizami's Iskandarnama. The text expresses a wish for the peace and stability brought about by Alexander as opposed to the period of instability and political turnover of his own time, and makes frequent reference to the "second Alexander" as a means of addressing his ruler Muhammad II, who assumed that title for himself during his reign.

Mirrors are used to play an important role across the Ayina. First of all, Alexander invents two mirrors: the mirror in Alexandria, and the diving bell he constructs alongside Aristotle to aid in the exploration of the ocean. Second, the mirror acts as a symbol to help Alexander see into the unseen. Third, mirrors act like reflections, and are used to represent how the author of the Ayina reflects or recounts the deeds of Alexander in his text about him, but it is only a reflection insofar as it is acknowledged that their original form cannot be directly accessed: "the mirrors of this second Alexander are such that if totally illuminated their appearance could not be contained within the rust-colored mirror of the sky."

== Synopsis ==
=== Summary ===
In Amir Khosrow's rendition and unlike that of earlier Persian renditions of Alexander legends, such as that of Nizami, the family ties between Alexander and Dara are not mentioned, nor is Alexander's victory over Dara and subsequent marriage to Roshanak. A notable stylistic innovation by Amir Khosrow is the introduction of each significant section with a passage resembling andarz, followed by an anecdote (hekayat), the narrative of Alexander, and concluding with a saqi-nama or moghanni-nama. Key Persian story components are present in Amir Khosrow's version: the journey to China, the construction of the wall against Gog and Magog, dialogues with philosophers, assaults on fire-worshippers, and the competition between Chinese and Greek painters. However, it omits the Land of Darkness and the Water of Life segments, as well as Alexander's transformation into a prophet. The narrative concludes with differing accounts of Alexander's demise and interment.

=== China ===
The text begins by briefly surveying Alexander's main deeds, and then the narrations of Alexander in the Shahnameh of Ferdowsi and the Iskandarnama of Nizami. Amir Khusrau then states that he will bring more attention to stories that were either overlooked or only mentioned in passing by these predecessors. This begins with a different and very long version of the clash with the king of China which Amir Khusrau claims to have read in read "in the History of the ancient kings". The bloody battle ends in a symbolic arm-wrestling match where Alexander effortlessly outmatches the Chinese Emperor, as though his arm were made of wax. It is possible that this story was structured as a polemical response to the expansion of the Mongols.

=== Philosophers and religions ===
Unlike Nizami's Iskandarnameh, which praises the philosophical thought of figures like Avicenna and al-Farabi, Amir Khusrau's Alexander rejects their principles of thought as by then the Muslim world had a much more negative view of their intellectual contributions. As for the Greeks, Alexander causes a flood to devastate Ancient Greece and only three philosophers survive: Plato, Heraclides Ponticus, and Porphyry. In another episode and with Aristotle under his supervision, Alexander develops a variety of technologies including the astrolabe, mirror, and the submarine. Alexander also becomes a more concretely Muslim figure who, unlike in Nizami's work, helps bring about the destruction of Zoroastrianism and Hinduism. Amir Khusrau's religious belief also led him to condemn the notion that the crowd lamented Alexander in his coffin after his death.

== Transliteration ==
There are many alternative ways to spell the text, such as Â’ ine-ye Eskandari. There is significant variation in how the three elements of the title Ayina-i Iskandarī are transliterated into English-language texts. In some cases, a dash instead of a space separates the second and third elements: Ayina-i-Iskandarī. The first element is various written as Aina, Ayina, Aʾinah, Âʾine. The second element is variously written as i, e, ye. The third element is variously written as Iskandari, Eskandari, Sikanderi.

== See also ==
- Alexander Romance
- Gog and Magog
- Horns of Alexander
- Qissat Dhi'l-Qarnayn
