= Alexandreis =

Medieval Latin poem by Walter of Châtillon

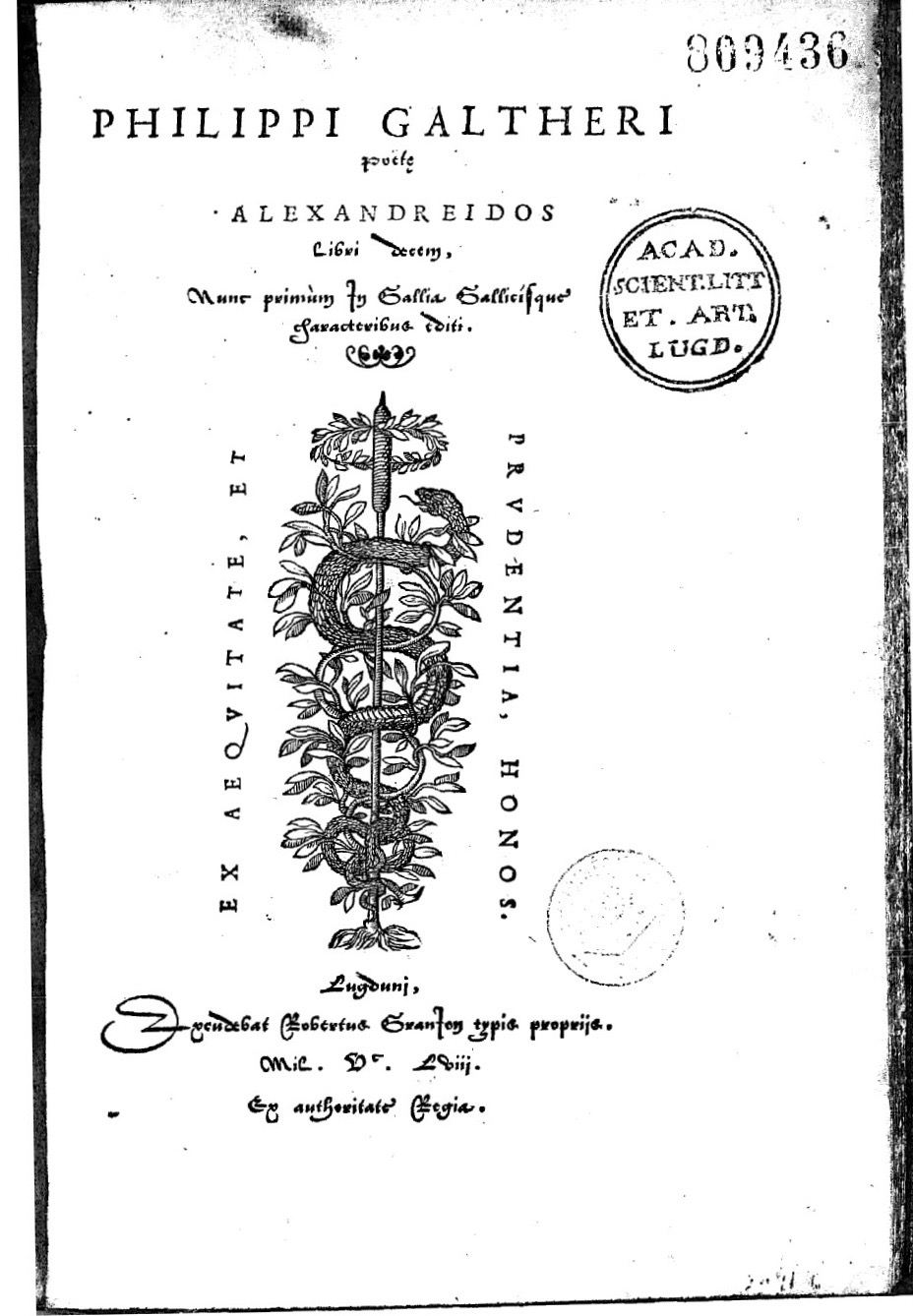
Alexandreis

The Alexandreis (or Alexandreid) is a medieval Latin epic poem by Walter of Châtillon, a 12th-century French writer and theologian. It gives an account of the life of Alexander the Great, based on Quintus Curtius Rufus' Historia Alexandri Magni. The poem was popular and influential in Walter's own times: according to Henry of Ghent, it was more popular than Virgil's Aeneid in thirteenth-century schools. Matthew of Vendôme and Alan of Lille borrowed from it and Henry of Settimello imitated it, but it is now seldom read. One line is sometimes quoted:

Incidis in Scyllam cupiens vitare Charybdim (You run into Scylla, desiring to avoid Charybdis) (V.301).

== Translations ==
Translations were made into Old Spanish (Libro de Alexandre), Middle Dutch (Jacob van Maerlant's Alexanders Geesten), Old Norse (Alexanders saga) and Old Czech (Alexandreida).

In 1996, David Townsend published an English translation of the Alexandreis.

== Contents ==
1. Aristotle warned by Alexander his pupil; destruction of Thebes; description of Asia; Alexander journeys to Ilium; account of the dream of Alexander
2. Alexander solves the Gordian knot; illness of Alexander; the Persian army; the shield of king Darius
3. Battle of the Issus; Tyre and Egypt are taken; Alexander's journey to the oracle of Ammon; death of the queen of Persia in captivity; message from the sarcophagus of the queen
4. Alexander's dream of the goddess Victoria
5. Battle of Arbela; Alexander is victorious and enters Babylon
6. Susa and Persepolis are taken; the doubts of Darius
7. Darius flees and is slain at Bessus; message from the tomb of Darius
8. War against the Hyrcani and Scythians; meeting of Thalestris queen of the Amazons with Alexander
9. Journey of the army to India; king Porus subdued by Alexander; description of India; weariness of the soldiers
10. Journey to the underworld; the oath; granting of the world; death of Alexander

== Bibliography ==
- F. J. E. Raby, A History of Secular Latin Poetry in the Middle Ages (Oxford: Clarendon Press, 1934. ISBN 0-19-814325-7) vol. 2 pp. 72–80.
- J. Blänsdorf, Einführung in Walther von Châtillon, Alexandreis ( https://web.archive.org/web/20070911073305/http://www.jblaensdorf-mainz.homepage.t-online.de/Walther__Alexandr_/walther__alexandr_.html )
- M. Colker, "Galteri de Castellione Alexandreis" (Padua: In aedibus Antenoreis, 1978.)
