= Adolf Ausfeld =

German classical scholar

Adolf Ausfeld (30 August 1855, in Gotha – 16 August 1904, in Heidelberg) was a German schoolteacher and classical philologist, known for his studies of "Alexander romance", defined as a collection of legends involving the mythical exploits of Alexander the Great.

He studied classical philology and German studies at the Universities of Jena, Göttingen and Leipzig, where in 1876, he obtained his doctorate with a dissertation on the classical poet Oppian, De Oppiano et scriptis sub eius nomine traditis. While a student at Leipzig, his influences were Friedrich Karl Theodor Zarncke, Rudolf Hildebrand and Friedrich Wilhelm Ritschl.

In 1880 he became a teaching intern at the Progymnasium in Donaueschingen, where two years later he earned the title of professor. Later on, he was an instructor at gymnasiums in Bruchsal (1886–1895) and Baden-Baden (from 1895). In 1896, along with several colleagues, under the leadership of archaeologist Friedrich von Duhn, he took part in an extended study tour of Italy, Sicily and Tunis. On the journey, he succumbed to malaria, and his colleagues were forced to leave him in Syracuse to recuperate. In 1902 he transferred to Heidelberg; where in early August 1904, he fell ill to tuberculosis and died soon afterwards.

== Works ==
- Uber die quellen zu Rudolfs von Ems Alexander, 1883 – On the sources of Rudolf von Ems' Alexander.
- Die Orosius-recension der Historia Alexandri Magni de preliis und Babiloths Alexanderchronik, 1886.
- Zur kritik des griechischen Alexanderromans. Untersuchungen über die unechten teile der ältesten überlieferung, 1894 – A critique of the Greek Alexander romance. Studies on the spurious parts of the oldest traditions.
- Der griechische Alexanderroman, 1907 (edited by Wilhelm Kroll after Ausfeld's death) – The Greek Alexander romance.
