= Helmut van Thiel =

German classical scholar (1932–2014)

- Born: 28 September 1932; Essen, Ruhr, Weimar Republic
- Died: 19 October 2014 (aged 82); Cologne, North Rhine-Westphalia, Germany
- Occupation: University professor
- Known for: Critical edition of the Iliad; Critical edition of the Odyssey

Academic background
- Education: University of Cologne (PhD); University of Tübingen; University of Hamburg

Academic work
- Discipline: Classics
- Sub-discipline: Alexander Romance • Ancient novel • Homeric scholarship
- Institutions: University of Cologne; German Arch. Inst. Athens; German Arch. Insti. Rome

Helmut van Thiel (28 September 1932 – 19 October 2014) was a German classical scholar and university professor.

== Biography ==
Born in Essen, van Thiel studied Classics and Archaeology at the University of Cologne (PhD, 1959), spending research periods in Tübingen and Hamburg and at the German Archaeological Institute at Athens and Rome. In 1960/1961 he won a grant from the German Archaeological Institute, which was extended for two years, and undertook extended research trips in the Mediterranean area, working in the institute's branches at Athens and Rome.

Then he obtained a research grant from the University of Cologne and worked with Reinhold Merkelbach. He was habilitated to university teaching in 1969 and became Professor in Classical Philology in 1970. He retired in 1998 but continued working with the university.

He died in 2014 in Cologne.

== Research activity ==
Van Thiel graduated defending a thesis on the Greek Alexander Romance, and published monographs on Petronius, the lost Greek novel of Lucius (a major source of The Golden Ass, by Apuleius), and the Alexander Romance itself.

Starting from the 1980s, he researched the Homeric poems and published critical editions of both, including two online editions of the D scholia to the Iliad. Van Thiel used a neo-analytical approach, and suggested that both the Iliad and the Odyssey are made of shorter poems which underwent an editing process in several stages, which merged them into the epics that we have today. Accordingly, his books on the subjects were titled Iliaden und Iliad [Iliads and Iliad] and Odysseen [Odysseys]. In 2009, he published German translations of both the Homeric poems.

He also published handbooks of Greek and Latin palaeography, with Merkelbach.

== Publications ==
- Van Thiel, H. (1959). Die Rezension λ des Pseudo-Kallisthenes. Habelts Dissertationsdrucke, 3. Bonn: Rudolf Habelt Verlag – via Internet Archive.
- Merkelbach, R.; van Thiel, H. (1965). Griechisches Leseheft zur Einführung in Paläographie und Textkritik. Studienhefte zur Altertumswissenschaft, 10. Göttingen: Vandenhoeck & Ruprecht.
- Merkelbach, R.; van Thiel, H. (1969). Lateinisches Leseheft zur Einführung in Paläographie und Textkritik. Studienhefte zur Altertumswissenschaft, 13. Göttingen: Vandenhoeck & Ruprecht.
- Van Thiel, H. (1971a). Der Eselsroman. Zetemata, 54-I. Vol. I: Untersuchungen. München: C. H. Beck.
- Van Thiel, H. (1971b). Petron. Überlieferung und Rekonstruktion. «Mnemosyne», Supplement 20. Leiden: E. J. Brill.
- Van Thiel, H. (1972a). Der Eselsroman. Zetemata, 54-II. Vol. II: Synoptische Ausgabe. München: C. H. Beck.
- Van Thiel, H. (1972b). Mittellateinische Texte. Ein Handschriften-Lesebuch. Studienhefte zur Altertumswissenschaft, 14. Göttingen: Vandenhoeck & Ruprecht.
- Van Thiel, H., ed. (1972c). Abenteuer eines Esels oder die Verwandlung des Lukios. Der griechische Eselsroman. Sammlung Tusculum. München: Heimeran Verlag.
- Van Thiel, H., ed. (1974). Leben und Taten Alexanders von Makedonien. Der griechische Alexanderroman nach der Handschrift L. Texte zur Forschung, 13. Darmstadt: Wissenschaftliche Buchgesellschaft.
- Van Thiel, H. (1982). Iliaden und Ilias. Basel • Stuttgart: Schwabe & Co.
- Van Thiel, H. (1988). Odysseen. Basel • Stuttgart: Schwabe & Co.
- Homerus (1991). van Thiel, H. (ed.). Odyssea. Bibliotheca Weidmanniana, 1. Hildesheim • Zürich • New York: Weidmann.
- Homerus (1996). van Thiel, H. (ed.). Ilias. Bibliotheca Weidmanniana, 2. Hildesheim • Zürich • New York: Weidmann.
- Van Thiel, H., ed. (2000a). Homerpur. Köln: Universitäts- und Stadtbibliothek.
- Van Thiel, H., ed. (2000b). Scholia D in Iliadem. Proecdosis 2000. Köln: Universitäts- und Stadtbibliothek.
- Van Thiel, H., ed. (2002). Lexeis homerikai. Proecdosis 2002. Köln: Universitäts- und Stadtbibliothek.
- Homer (2009a). van Thiel, H. (ed.). Iliaden. Berlin • Münster: LIT Verlag. ISBN 978-3-8258-1784-8.
- Homer (2009b). van Thiel, H. (ed.). Odysseen. Berlin • Münster: LIT Verlag. ISBN 978-3-8258-1785-5.
- Homerus (2010). van Thiel, H. (ed.). Odyssea. Bibliotheca Weidmanniana, 1 (2. ed.). Hildesheim • Zürich • New York: Weidmann.
- Aristarchus; Aristophanes Byzantius; Demetrius Ixion; Zenodotus (2014). van Thiel, H. (ed.). Fragmente zur Ilias. Vol. I–IV. Berlin • Boston: De Gruyter. ISBN 978-3-11-034314-4.
- Van Thiel, H., ed. (2014). Scholia D in Iliadem. Proecdosis aucta et correctior 2014. Elektronische Schriftenreihe der Universitäts- und Stadtbibliothek Köln, 7. Köln: Universitäts- und Stadtbibliothek. ISBN 978-3-931596-83-5.

== Bibliography ==
- Schniederjürgen, Axel, ed. (2007). "Van Thiel, Helmut". Kürschners deutscher Gelehrten-Kalender. Vol. III (21st ed.). München: Saur. p. 3711. ISBN 978-3-598-23616-7. ISSN 1616-8399.
- Universität zu Köln (19 October 2014). "Prof. Dr. Helmut van Thiel". Universität zu Köln | Philosophische Fakultät | Altertumskunde. Archived from the original on 25 October 2022.
