= Historia de preliis =

The Historia de preliis Alexandri Magni (History of Alexander's Battles), more commonly known as the Historia de preliis (History of Battles), is a family of Latin translations of the Alexander Romance that all go back to the Nativitas et victoria Alexandri Magni regis of Leo the Archpriest. Between the twelfth and fifteenth centuries, the Historia went through three major recensions and it is through these recensions that the text is known today as the original is lost. The three recensions are called I^{1}, I^{2}, and I^{3} (also called J^{1}, J^{2}, and J^{3} in some publications). Their influence was enormous on medieval European literature, spawning an immense number of translations into almost every vernacular and subsequently making Alexander a household name in the European Middle Ages. The Alexander Romance, through the Latin Historia, underwent more translations than any text with the exception of the Gospels.

The name Historia de preliis is an abbreviation of the name Liber Alexandria Philippi Macedonum qui primus regnavit in Grecia et de proeliis eiusdem. This is the name for the work known from its oldest known manuscript, Bodleian Rawlinson B 149.

Leo's prologue at the beginning of the text states that when he found the manuscript, he immediately began to work on its translation before bringing it back to Naples. The prologue also follows up on a debate that went back to among the earliest Christians, concerning the value of pagan literature and knowledge. The prologue takes the argument that not only were the pagans in some respects capable of virtue, but that because they were, the Christian must be evermore a reflection of a virtuous life. Alexander's legendary life represented a form of virtuous military action that the story sought to recount.

== Nativitas et victoria Alexandri Magni regis ==
The Navitas et victoria Alexandri Magni regis (The Birth and Victories of King Alexander the Great) is a lost tenth-century Latin translation of the Greek Alexander Romance of Pseudo-Callisthenes, produced from a copy of a Greek manuscript discovered in Constantinople by Leo the Archpriest. Leo had undertaken a mission commissioned to him by John III of Naples. According to Domenico Comparetti, John III was a duke with an interest in the collection of letters and writings from wherever they could be found, of both secular and religious content. It is in this context that Leo was one of John's chief agents in the collection of Greek manuscripts followed by their translation into the Latin vernacular.

The translation is believed to have been produced between 951 and 969, as it was commissioned after the death of John IIIs wife, Theodora, which took place in 951, and it must have been completed before Leo himself died in 969.

Leo's translation was based on the α recension of the Alexander Romance. Though originally titled the Navitas, it came to later be known as the Historia de preliis, a title which refers to not one but three independent Latin versions or recensions on Leo's translation that came to attract considerable popularity in the European Middle Ages and made Alexander a household name.

Despite being lost, a manuscript close to Leo's text is known; it is known from:

- A manuscript from the cathedral library in Bamberg founded by Emperor Henry II. It is known as Bamberg, Staatsbibliothek, Msc. Hist. 3 (olim E. III.14), sigla Ba. It also contains several other Alexander treatises, such as the Commonitorium Palladdii and the Collatio Alexandri et Dindimi.
- A thirteenth-century manuscript known as MS 342 (L) from the Lambeth Palace Library, containing five-eighths of Leo's text.
- The Historia de preliis, ultimately based on Leo's translation, especially I^{1} (for which a critical edition was published in 1992).

== Bavarian recension ==
The Bamberg manuscript of Leo's Nativitas et vicotira was the source for the Bavarian recension, the original manuscript of which is lost. There are two surviving manuscripts:

- Munich, Bayerische Staatsbibliothek, Clm 23489, written in the mid-12th century in the monastery of Schäftlarn
- Paris, Bibliothèque Nationale de France, n.a.l. 310, written in the late 12th century in the monastery of Tegernsee

The Paris manuscript expands the text with additions from Orosius. It was the basis for Johannes Hartlieb's German translation.

== Interpolated recensions ==
=== I^{1} ===
I^{1} was produced in the eleventh-century and was the primary source of the next two recensions. It appears to be a product of the now-lost δ recension. It also took the first significant step in transforming the Romance from an entertaining narrative into one which helps convey moral narratives and stories. Major episodes included in this recension are Alexander's visit to Jerusalem, the ascent of Alexander into an eagles basket (one of the most popular scenes depicted in medieval cathedral art), his subsequent descent into the diving bell, a scene involving prophesying trees, and a correspondence with the Brahman king Dindimus.

=== I^{2} ===
I^{2} was produced in 1118–19, in the twelfth century, whose redactor may have been the geographer Guido of Pisa. It is sometimes referred to as the Orosius-recension because it includes material from the Historiae adversum paganos (417 AD) of Orosius, a friend of Augustine. It also describes Alexander's sealing away of the barbarian tribes Gog and Magog. This recension is the likely source for the Roman d'Alexandre en prose and the Buik of Alexander. Along with I^{3}, this recension was widely known in Italy.

=== I^{3} ===
I^{3} was produced in the early thirteenth century (ca. 1218–36) and adds narratives concerning the dangers of the ambition and vanity involved in kingship, and introduces a story where two Greek philosophers and one Jewish philosopher debated, in Alexander's presence, whether the king should embrace monotheism. This version was also the direct source for a famous and long Latin epic by Quilichinus of Spoleto, which was published in 1236 (serving as a terminus ad quem for the composition of I^{3}).

The I^{3} recension is the form that the Historia became most popular in and was the basis of a long line of later works and translations, such as its 1236 reworking by Quilichinus. It is known from a large number of manuscripts and, from 1471 onwards, underwent numerous printings.

== Manuscripts ==
The following list of manuscripts is based on the one provided by Hilka & Magoun 1934.

=== I^{1} ===
- Bg1 — Bamberg, Staatsbibl., MS. 85(M.II.8), fol. 119r-164r.
- Bg2 — Bamberg, Staatsbibl., MS. 85a(N.I.5), fol. 3r-21r.
- G — Graz, Universitatsbibl., MS. 1520, fol. 1r -49v.
- I — Innsbruck, Universitatsbibl., cod. Oenipontanus 525, fol. lr-65v.
- L1 — London, British Museum, MS. Royal 13.C.12, fol. 83r-109v.
- L2 — London, British Museum, MS. Arundel 123, fol. 43r-71r.
- M — Munich, Bayer. Staatsbibl., MS. lat. 7843, fol. 127r-195r.
- m — Munich, Bayer. Staatsbibl., MS. lat. 12260, fol. 160r-165v (excerpta).
- O1 — Oxford, Bodleian Lib., MS. Rawlinson A.273 (Western 111h9), fol. 31r-61r.
- O2 — Oxford, Bodleian Lib., MS. Rawlinson B.149, pp. 133–206.
- O3 — Oxford, Bodleian Lib., MS. E. D. Clarke 27 (Western 18389), fol. 1P-27r.
- O4 — Oxford, New College Lib., MS. 342, fol. 72r-153v.
- P — Paris, Bibl. Nat., MS. fonds lat. 8501, fol. 2r-57

=== I^{2} ===
- B — Berlin, Staatsbibl., MS. lat. quarto 555, fol. 12r-75r.
- Ba — Basel, Universititsbibl., MS. A.11.34, fol. 321r-331r (excerpta).
- Br1 — Breslau, Universitiatsbibl., MS. I.Fol.472, fol. 217v-248v.
- Br2 — Breslau, Universitatsbibl., MS. IV.Fol.33, fol. 1r-27v.
- Br3 — Breslau, Universitiitsbibl., MS. IV.Fol.34, fol. 97r-115v.
- Br4 — Breslau, Stadtbibl., MS. R.58, fol. 85r-128r.
- Bx1 — Brussels, Bibl. Royale, MS. 1663, fol. lr-46r.
- Bx2 — Brussels, Bibl. Royale, MS. 3915, fol. 74r-109r.
- C1 — Cambridge (Eng.), Corpus Christi Coll. Lib., MS. 129, fol. 15r-31v.
- C2 — Cambridge (Eng.), Corpus Christi Coll. Lib., MS. 370, fol. 48r-80r.
- D — Danzig, Stadtbibl., MS. 1974, fol. 229r-240r.
- Kg — Konigsberg, Universitiatsbibl., MS. 334, fol. 57r-115r (free version; mixed text).
- Lg — Leipzig, Stadtbibl., MS. repositorium 11.4'.143, fol. 1r-11Jr. Ml Munich, Bayer. Staatsbibl., MS. lat. 824, fol. 1r-78r.
- M2 — Munich, Bayer. Staatsbibl., MS. lat. 21665, fol. 1r-33r.
- Mk — Mikulov (Nikolsburg, Czechoslovakia), MS.I1.112, fol. 150r-156v (free version; mixed text).
- Mo — Modena, Bibl. Estense, MS.a.W.8.14, fol. 97r-131v.
- N — Naples, Biblioteca Naz., MS.V.F. 27, fol. 1r-119r.
- O5 — Oxford, Bodleian Lib., MS. Auct. F.3.3, fol. 130r-153r.
- O6 — Oxford, Bodleian Lib., MS. 341 (We8tern 2445), fol. 137r-159v.
- P1 — Paris, Bibl. Nat., MS. lat. 2477, fol. 30r-67v.
- P2 — Paris, Bibl. Nat., MS. lat. 6041, fol. 2OOr-209r.
- P3 — Paris, Bibl. Nat., MS. lat. 8503, fol. 7v-26v.
- P4 — Paris, Bibl. Nat., MS. lat. 13710, fol. 1r-75v.
- P5 — Paris, Bibl. Nat., MS. lat. 14169, fol. 80r-193r.
- P6 — Paris, Bibl. Nat., MS. nouv. acq. lat. 174, fol. 1r-40v. See i3 below.
- P7 — Paris, Bibl. Mazarine, MS. lat. 780, fol. 115r-151r.
- Pg — Prague, Bibl. Metropol. MS. 1022, fol. 98r-122r.
- Po — Pommersfelden (Bavaria), MS. 2855, fol. 1O9r-147r.
- R — Rome, Bibl. Apostol. Vat., MS. lat. 7190, fol. 1r-42v.
- S(H) — Harvard University (Cambridge, Mass.), Harvard Coll. Lib., MS. lat. 121F, fol. 103r-150v. Formerly Seitenstettin (Austria), MS. 31.
- St — Stuttgart, Landesbibl., Cod. historicus infol. 411, fol. 223r-229r.
- V1 — Venice, Bibl. Naz. di San Marco, MS. lat.X.216, fol. 1r-40v.
- V2 — Venice, Bibl. Naz. di San Marco, MS. lat. 406, fol. 1r-58v.
- W1 — Vienna, Nazional-Bibl., MS. lat. 3247, fol. 6r-53v.
- W2 — Vienna, Nazional-Bibl., MS. lat. 3412, fol. 157r-185r.
- Wo — Wolfenbuttel, Grosshrzgl. Bibl. MS. 671 (Helmstddt 622), fol. 182t-234r.

=== I^{3} ===
- B1 — Berlin, Staatsbibl., MS. lat. quarto 518, fol. 81r-133r.
- B2 — Berlin, Staatsbibl., MS. lat. octavo 49, fol. 1r94v.
- Ba1 — Basel, Universitatsbibl., MS.E.III.17, fol. 117r-135v.
- Be — Bern, Universitiatsbibl., MS. 247, fol. 134r-174v.
- Bo1 — Bologna, R. Bibl. Univ., MS. 1951, 53 fol.
- Bo2 — Bologna, R. Bibl. Univ., MS. 2761, 49 fol.
- C3 — Cambridge (Eng.), St John's College Lib., MS. 184(G. 16), fol. 1r-39v.
- C4 — Cambridge (Eng.), Trinity College Lib., MS. 946, fol. 1r-24r.
- Co — Cortona, Accademia Etrusca, MS. 240, fol. 1r-55r.
- Dr — Darmstadt, Hessische Landesbibl., MS. 231, fol. 48v-9Ov.
- F — Florence, Bibl. Laurenziana, MS. Riccard. 522, fol. 19r-35v.
- GI — Glasgow, University Library, MS. Hunterian 84, 39 fol.
- H — Harvard Univ., Cambridge (Mass.), Harv. Coll. Lib., MS. lat. 34, 12 fol.
- Ho — Holkham, Nf. (Eng.), Library of Lord Leicester, MS. 457, fol. 1r-37r.
- Ka1 — Karlsruhe, Bad. Landesbibl., MS. Reichenau LXIII, fol. 42r-70v.
- Ka2 — Karlsruhe, Bad. Landesbibl., MS. Reichenau 134, fol. 1r-155r.
- M3 — Munich, Bayer. Staatsbibl., MS. lat. 14796, fol. 13r-158r.
- Ma — Madrid, Bibl. Nacional, MS. 10222, 16 fol.
- Mi1 — Milan, Bibl. Braidense, MS. A.D. XIII.29, fol. 1r-55r.
- Mi2 — Milan, Bibl. Ambrosiana, MS. C. p18, fol. 3r-24v.
- Mi3 — Milan, Bibl. Ambrosiana, MS. 1.64, fol. 1v-69r.
- Mo1 — Modena, Bibl. Estense, MS. a. F.1.27, fol. 8r-47v.
- P6 — Paris, Bibl. Nat., MS. nouv. acq. lat. 174, fol. 41r-46v. See I2 above.

== Editions and translations ==
An edition of all three recensions was published by Bergmeister in 1975.

A translation of the I^{1} recension was published in 1992 by R.T. Pritchard.

== See also ==
- Res gestae Alexandri Macedonis
- Qissat al-Iskandar
