= Qissat Dhi'l-Qarnayn =

The Qissat Dhi'l-Qarnayn (Note: Dhi'l-Qarnayn is the genitive of Dhu'l-Qarnayn in Arabic.) (Arabic: قصة ذي القرنين Qiṣṣat Ḏī l-Qarnayn, lit. 'Story of Dhu'l-Qarnayn') is a Hispano-Arabic legend of Alexander the Great preserved in two fourteenth-century manuscripts in Madrid and likely dates as a ninth-century Arabic translation of the Syriac Alexander Romance produced in al-Andalus. In this respect, it is similar to the Hadith Dhi'l-Qarnayn and is an example of the literary genre of Qisas al-Anbiya (Stories of the Prophets). It is to be distinguished from another text also known as the Qissat Dhi'l-Qarnayn found in the book of prophets by al-Tha'labi (d. 1036) as well as the Qissat al-Iskandar, a text dating to the late eighth or early ninth century representing the earliest translation of the Alexander Romance into Arabic.

The Qissat depicts the travels of Alexander whom it identifies with the figure named Dhu'l-Qarnayn (lit. 'the Two-Horned One') in Surat al-Kahf of the Quran, referred to as Dhu'l-Qarnayn in the text (in Arabic-language Alexander traditions, Alexander was variously called "al-Iskandar Dhu'l-Qarnayn", or sometimes just "Dhu'l-Qarnayn"). The Qissa depicts Alexander (Dhu'l-Qarnayn) as a faithful believer and as a proto-Muslim who spreads monotheism through his conquests. It combines elements of pre-Islamic Alexander legends in addition to novel traditions developed in the oral Arab-Islamic tradition. Using the Islamic citation method of isnad, the text prefaces each narrative episode with a chain of transmitters that root in one of Muhammad's companions. Its primary transmitters are given as Ka'b al-Ahbar, Ibn 'Abbas, Muqatil ibn Sulayman, 'Abd al-Malik al-Mashuni, and 'Abd al-Malik b. Zayd. An English translation of the Qissat Dhi'l-Qarnayn was first produced by David Zuwiyya in 2001.

== Language ==
The Qissat Dhi'l-Qarnayn is composed in an "unsuccessful" Classical Arabic, in a Western Arabic script, with a regular interference from Middle Arabic from the Spanish-Arabic scribe.

== Narrative ==
=== Upbringing ===
In the Qissa, Dhu'l-Qarnayn travels extensively across the world and reaches Asia, Africa, India, and more. Growing up, he is tutored by Aristotle. He gains a reputation for wisdom and soon receives a visit from an angel named Zayaqil (Raphael), which is lower in the hierarchy of Islamic angels compared to Gabriel, the angel that Muslims believe visited Muhammad. He is taken on a visionary flight to the heavens, where he is largely kept under the wing of the angel Zayaqil only to poke his head out to look from time to time, during which he one time misrecognizes the whole world as his city.

=== Journeys ===
After this, he begins his world-travels, covering islands and crossing distances in days what takes others a year. The first island Dhu'l-Qarnayn reaches has a castle made of red, white, and green marble, and is composed of a whirling bottom section that cannot be entered and an upper section that also begins to whirl when approached. Dhu'l-Qarnayn constructs a replica of this castle that enables him enter the fortress, in which he finds a locked chest containing a tablet created by a pre-Adamic race known as the Yanuni that prophesies of the coming of Muhammad centuries later. In Egypt, he builds the city of Alexandria (Iskandariyya in Arabic). After describing this, the story states that his Greek name is Alexander and that his Arabic name is Ahmad b. Asas. In Africa, Dhu'l-Qarnayn encounters a dogheaded peoples who wear skins and are not Muslim. When he encounters the Ethiopians, they inform him that they are descendants of Kush, the grandson of Noah, who had migrated there. They agree to become believers and testify to God's unity in accordance with Dhu'l-Qarnayn's ultimatum of war otherwise (to which he presents all peoples he encounters), and Dhu'l-Qarnayn is also described as replacing their practice of eating the dead with burying them. In the Land of Darkness, Dhu'l-Qarnayn encounters the prophet al-Khidr. Before his death, Dhu'l-Qarnayn becomes the first to perform the hajj and circumambulate the Kaaba in Mecca. During his journeys, he would come to conquer Persia, India, China, and Europe.

=== Death ===
After circumambulating the Kaaba, Dhu'l-Qarnayn dies in Mecca. Three other versions of Dhu'l-Qarnayn's death are also recorded in the Qissat, which is noted for its refusal to smooth over the disagreements in the reports it is familiar with, but instead typically presents several versions of narratives. In a second version of Dhu'l-Qarnayn's death, Dhu'l-Qarnayn's body is buried in a Temple of Apollo. In the third version, Dhu'l-Qarnayn dies in Jerusalem, which is referred to as "Bayt al-muqaddas" in the story. In the fourth version, Dhu'l-Qarnayn dies in Dawma al-Jandal, located in the al-Jawf province of Saudi Arabia near the border with Jordan. After Dhu'l-Qarnayn dies, the author of the Qissat argues that despite his appearance in the Qur'an, first performance of the hajj, and conquering of the world, Dhu'l-Qarnayn should not be considered a prophet, therefore diverging from other works of the qisas genre where Dhu'l-Qarnayn is viewed as a minor prophet in the long-line of pre-Islamic sages. Dhu'l-Qarnayn's passing is also preceded by him preparing his mother to accept his death (expanding on a narrative originating in the third-century Alexander Romance) into which this text contains a rare introspection into Muslim women's culture.
