= Shurideh Shirazi =

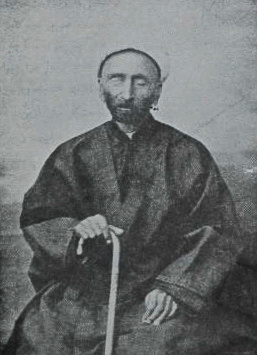
- Picture of Shurideh Shirazi
- Born: 1858; Shiraz, Qajar Iran
- Died: 14 October 1926 (aged 67–68); Shiraz, Pahlavi Iran
- Occupation: Poet
- Writing career
- Language: Persian

Shurideh Shirazi (Persian: شوریده شیرازی: 1858 – 14 October 1926) was a poet in late 18th and early 19th century Iran, who wrote in Persian.

== Sources ==
- Rahman, Munibur (1995). "S̲h̲ūrīda, Muḥammad Taḳī". In Bosworth, C. E.; van Donzel, E.; Heinrichs, W. P. & Lecomte, G. (eds.). The Encyclopaedia of Islam, Second Edition. Volume VIII: Ned–Sam. Leiden: E. J. Brill. ISBN 978-90-04-09834-3.
