= Robai =

- Industry: Robotics Products
- Headquarters: Cambridge, Massachusetts
- Products: Humanoid Robot Arm
- Website: www.robai.com

Robai is a company that develops robotics products for the consumer, research, and educational communities. Robai’s primary product is the line of Cyton robotic arms. These robot arms have seven degrees of freedom and are kinematically redundant with a structural layout similar to that of the human arm. They are able to reach around obstacles and reconfigure while manipulating objects. Robai uses Actin robot-control software developed by Energid Technologies Corporation but, also provides an interface through Robot Operating System (ROS). The Robai Cyton Gamma arm is being investigated for next generation light-duty manufacturing.
