= Walter of Châtillon =

12th-century French writer and theologian

Walter of Châtillon (Latinized as Gualterus de Castellione) was a 12th-century French writer and theologian who wrote in the Latin language. He studied under Stephen of Beauvais and at the University of Paris. It was probably during his student years that he wrote a number of Latin poems in the Goliardic manner that found their way into the Carmina Burana collection. During his lifetime, however, he was more esteemed for a long Latin epic on the life of Alexander the Great, the Alexandreis, sive Gesta Alexandri Magni, a hexameter epic, full of anachronisms; he depicts the Crucifixion of Jesus as having already taken place during the days of Alexander the Great. The Alexandreis was popular and influential in Walter's own times. Matthew of Vendôme and Alan of Lille borrowed from it and Henry of Settimello imitated it, but it is now seldom read. One line, referring to Virgil's Aeneid, is sometimes quoted:

Incidit in Scyllam cupiens vitare Charybdim("He runs into Scylla, wanting to avoid Charybdis")

Extract from 1558 edition.

Many poems in his style, or borrowing his themes, have been attributed to Walter on insufficient evidence. For example, he was not the author of the satirical Apocalypse of Golias once attributed to him. In addition to his poems, Walter wrote a dialogue refuting Jewish thought and biblical interpretation and a treatise on the Trinity, and he was possibly the author of Moralium dogma philosophorum. He died of bubonic plague early in the 13th century.

David Townsend summarizes one commentary on Walter's life as follows:

Thereafter he entered into the service of Guillaume des Blanches Mains (William of the White Hands), brother-in-law of Louis VII, uncle of Philip Augustus, archbishop of Sens and subsequently of Reims. The Alexandreis is dedicated to William, as the opening of Book One and the close of Books Five and Ten attest. The initial letters of the poem's ten books spell out GUILLERMUS. One thirteenth-century biographical gloss from Paris, Bibliotheque Nationale, MS lat. 8358, fol. 91v, suggests that Walter composed the poem to regain William's favor. According to the anecdote, Walter was jealous of William's sexual liaison with a cleric named Berterus; he took his revenge by contriving the recitation of a scurrilous jingle at the papal curia, thus effectively 'outing' the archbishop (and himself) before the Pope....
