= Leo of Naples =

Leo of Naples (fl. 950s), also called Leo the Archpriest (Italian: Leone Arciprete), was a diplomat and translator in the service of Dukes John III and Marinus II of Naples. He undertook a diplomatic mission to Constantinople, the capital of the Byzantine Empire, during the joint reign of Constantine VII and Romanus II between 945 and 959. During his time in the capital, he came across the Alexander Romance, a collection of Greek stories about Alexander the Great, and had a copy made for Theodora, the wife of John III. After Theodora's death, John commissioned Leo to translate the Romance into Latin. The date of Theodora's death is unknown, but she was still living in 951. John died in 968 or 969. All that is known of Leo comes from the prologue he wrote to this translation, in which he calls himself an archipresbyter.

Leo entitled his work Nativitas et victoria Alexandri Magni regis (The Birth and Victories of Alexander the Great). The autograph does not survive and all surviving copies contain interpolations. Collectively, all the derivative versions of Leo's text are known today by the title Historia de preliis (History of Battles), which was given to a pre-1500 printing of the third recension at Strasbourg.

== Bibliography ==
- Cary, George (1956). The Medieval Alexander. Cambridge University Press.
- Chiesa, Paolo (2005). "Leone". Dizionario Biografico degli Italiani, Volume 64: Latilla–Levi Montalcini (in Italian). Rome: Istituto dell'Enciclopedia Italiana. ISBN 978-8-81200032-6.
