= Gui de Cambrai =

Gui de Cambrai (born in the second half of the 12th century, died in the 13th century), was a medieval writer from northern France who used vernacular French rather than Latin language. He wrote Le Vengement Alixandre (Alexander revenged), an 1806-line epic poem (c. 1190).

A French version of Barlaam and Josaphat (c. 1220–1225) has also been tentatively attributed to de Cambrai.

== Bibliography ==
- Edwards, Bateman, A Classification of the Manuscripts of Gui de Cambrai's "Vengement Alixandre", Princeton, Princeton University Press; 1928.
- Armstrong, Edward C, The French Metrical Versions of Barlaam and Josaphat, with Especial Reference to the Termination in Gui de Cambrai, Princeton, Princeton University Press;
