= Sīrat al-Iskandar =

Medieval Arabic heroic narrative

The Sīrat al-Iskandar (Arabic: سيرة الإسكندر, 'Life of Alexander') is a 13th-century Arabic popular romance about Alexander the Great. It belongs to the sīra shaʿbiyya genre and was composed by Mufarrij al-Ṣūrī in the 15th century.

The Sīrat is likely the ultimate source of the Malay Hikayat Iskandar Zulkarnain.

== Composition history ==
The Sīrat originates in an oral tradition of Alexander epics. Oral performance of the work, however, is poorly attested. The Dutch explorer Ulrich Jasper Seetzen recorded hearing public recitations of the Sīrat al-Iskandar in Cairo in the early 19th century. The written form of the Sīrat was composed by Abū Isḥāq Ibrahīm ibn Mufarrij al-Ṣūrī towards the end of the 13th century. It is the longest Arabic Alexander narrative at 305 folios (more than 600 pages). It is preserved in twelve identified manuscripts, but a majority of these does not contain the complete text. A majority does name al-Ṣūrī as the rāwī (narrator or reciter). He was a citizen of Tyre.

The Sīrat is distinct from the Sīrat al-Malik al-Iskandar, the Arabic version of the ancient Greek Alexander Romance, which is a literary rather than popular work. It follows a completely different narrative from that found in the Alexander Romance or in the Arabic Dhu ʾl-Qarnayn tradition. Al-Ṣūrī cites Kaʿb al-Aḥbār and Wahb ibn Munabbih as his major sources. He also sometimes cites Abu ʾl-Ḥasan al-Bakrī. In general, however, he does not cite sources. One of the distinguishing features of the narrative, as the long title suggests, is the prominence of al-Khiḍr as Alexander's companion in all his adventures, not just that to the Land of Darkness.

Among the identifiable but uncited sources of the Sīrat are Firdawsī's Shāhnāma (for the Persian background) and the 9th-century Nihāyat al-arab (for Alexander's conversion to monotheism).

== Synopsis ==
In the Sīrat, Alexander is a son of Dārāb, a prince of the Achaemenid dynasty of Persia, and Nāhīd, daughter of King Philip II of Macedon. He is born in secret at Philip's court and is raised by Aristotle. He eventually succeeds Philip as king, while his half-brother Dārā succeeds to the Persian throne. They go to war and Alexander is victorious, with Dārā dying in his arms.

After returning to Macedon, Alexander comes under the influence of the devil, Iblīs, until he is brought back to the right path by al-Khiḍr, who convinces him he has a divine mission: to convert the whole world to monotheism. The two travel first to the West and then to the East, converting people everywhere they go. Alexander then constructs the famous wall confining Gog and Magog before setting out for the Land of Darkness to find the Water of Life. He is prevented from reaching the water by the Isrāfīl (angels), who instead give him the wonderstone. Shortly after, Alexander writes a letter of consolation to his mother and dies. He is buried in Alexandria.

Some manuscripts contain an alternate ending based on the last days of Alexander as found in the Alexander Romance. This is one of four interpolations from the Romance found in some copies of the Sīrat, the others being the letter of Alexander to Aristotle, the letter of Aristotle to Alexander and Alexander's encounter with the Amazons.

== Bibliography ==
- Doufikar-Aerts, Faustina (2003). "Sīrat al-Iskandar: An Arabic Popular Romance of Alexander". Oriente Moderno. Nuova serie. 22 (2): 505–520. doi:10.1163/22138617-08302016. JSTOR 25817892.
- Doufikar-Aerts, Faustina (2010). "A Letter in Bits and Pieces: The Epistola Alexandri ad Aristotelem Arabica. A First Edition with Translation Based on Four 16th–18th-century Manuscripts". In R. Kerr; T. Milo (eds.). Writings and Writing from Another World and Another Era in Honour of J. J. Witkam. Archetype. pp. 91–115.
- Zuwiyya, Z. David (2011). "The Alexander Romance in the Arabic Tradition". In Z. David Zuwiyya (ed.). A Companion to Alexander Literature in the Middle Ages. Brill. pp. 73–112.
