= Henry of Settimello =

Italian poet

Henry of Settimello (Italian: [arˈriːɡo da ˈsɛttimɛllo]; in Latin, Henricus Septimellensis or Henricus Pauper; in Italian, Arrigo or Arrighetto da Settimello) was a late 12th-century Italian poet. Arrigo is considered Italy's leading Latin poet of what is called the twelfth-century Renaissance. He was the author of De diversitate fortunæ et philosophiæ consolatione (“On varying fortune and the consolation of philosophy”), a Latin poem in elegiac couplets. His Latin nickname (meaning “Henry the poor”) is linked with a story that he could not afford paper and was forced to write his poems on old parchment.

== Biography ==
Arrighetto or Arrigo da Settimello was born of humble parents in the village of Settimello near Prato, in the latter part of the twelfth century. He studied at Bologna, became a priest, and obtained the rich benefice of Calenzano in the Florentine territory. Afterwards, through some circumstance which is not clearly ascertained, he lost his benefice and became very poor. Filippo Villani, in his “Lives of Illustrious Florentines,” says that the Bishop of Florence, a grasping, covetous man, instituted a lawsuit against Arrighetto, in order to deprive him of his benefice, which he wished to bestow upon one of his own relatives. The lawsuit was protracted for years, during which Arrighetto spent his whole property, and finally lost his benefice. He is said to have been reduced to the greatest distress, even to beggary. He then composed an elegiac poem, entitled “De diversitate fortunæ et philosophiæ consolatione.” The beginning is an imitation of that of the Book of Lamentations.

Quomodo sola sedet probitas? flet et ingemit Aleph.
Facta velut vidua quæ prior uxor erat.

The poem consists of about one thousand lines, and is divided into four books. The first two books are full of general complaints of his misfortunes, of his poverty, but especially of his being pointed at by the finger of scorn:

Gentibus opprobrium sum, crebraque fabula vulgi;
Dedecus agnoscit tota platea meum.
Me digito monstrant; subsannant dentibus omnes,
Ut monstrum monstror dedecorosus ego.

But amidst the poet’s lamentations there is no clue as to the cause of his misfortunes—nothing to confirm Villani’s account. On the contrary, there is a passage in which the poet addresses the Bishop of Florence in terms of affectionate respect:

Inclyte, cui vivo, si vivo, provide Præsul
Florentine, statum scito benigne meum.

And after saying that he had reached the utmost point of calamity, he thus concludes his address:

Vivus et extinctus te semper amabo, sed esset
Viventis melior quam morientis amor.

Tiraboschi comments upon the discrepancy between these expressions of the poet and Villani’s statement of the injury done to him by the bishop, and he seems inclined to reject Villani’s account. It is rather singular that another solution of this apparent inconsistency did not suggest itself to Tiraboschi. We find one Bishop Bernardo registered as having administered the see of Florence from 1182 till about 1189, when he was succeeded by Bishop Pietro, who governed that see till 1205. Arrighetto was writing his poem about 1192, or soon after, for he alludes to two events which had happened in that year as facts of recent occurrence, namely, the assassination of the King of Jerusalem Conrad of Montferrat, and the imprisonment of Richard I of England by Leopold of Austria. Arrighetto, therefore, in the lines above quoted, was addressing the new bishop Pietro, and appealing to his commiseration for the distress which he endured, in consequence, perhaps, of the vexations of the former bishop, Bernardo. The account of Filippo Villani, a countryman of Arrighetto, living at no very great distance of time, and a writer evidently well informed of the internal history of his country, need not be hastily rejected.

In the third and fourth books of his poem, Arrighetto, in imitation of Boethius, introduces Philosophy, suggesting to him the usual arguments of consolation, and reproving him for his want of resignation:

Dic ubi sunt quæ te docuit Bononia quondam?
Hæc ego, dic ubi sunt, quæ tibi sæpe dedi?
Te multum fovi, docui te, sæpe rogavi,
Et mea secreta sæpe videre dedi.
Tu mea vitis eras: tu palmitis umbra novelli;
Tu fructus validam spem mihi sæpe dabas.

Nothing further is known of Arrighetto. His poem is said to have been much esteemed and to have become a textbook and a model of poetical composition in the schools of Italy. Christian Daum first undertook to edit the text, at the solicitation of Magliabechi, but his death left the edition unfinished. The poem was afterwards printed and published by Polykarp Leyser, in 1721, in his “Historia poetarum Medii Ævi” (pp. 453-497). It was edited again by Domenico Maria Manni at Florence, in 1730, with a translation in Italian prose made by an anonymous writer, who, by his style, is supposed to have lived in the fourteenth century. This Italian translation, which is entitled “Trattato contro l’avversità della Fortuna,” has been registered by the Accademia della Crusca among the textbooks of the Italian language, and was reprinted in 1815 by the publisher Silvestri of Milan. Lorenzo Mehus, in his “Life of Ambrose Traversari,” speaks of Arrighetto and his poem at some length. Several manuscript copies of the Latin text are scattered about the libraries of Italy and Germany, showing that the work had been in request during the Middle Ages. In some of the manuscripts the author is called Henricus Samariensis, or “the Samaritan,” probably in allusion to the abject state into which he tells us that he had fallen. He is also called “Henry the poor” (in Latin, Henricus pauper). In a manuscript in the Biblioteca Ambrosiana at Milan he is styled “Henricus Samariensis, Versilogus, Doctor Grammaticus.” Some biographers have confounded Arrighetto with Arrigo Simintendi of Prato who lived much later, and who translated Ovid’s Metamorphoses into Italian.

== Editions ==
- Arrighetto, ovvero Trattato contro all'avversità della fortuna di Arrigo da Settimello, ed. Domenico Maria Manni, Florence, 1730. [Latin with Italian prose translation].
- II Boezio e I'Arrighetto nelle versioni del trecento, ed. Salvatore Battaglia. Turin: UTET, 1929. [14th-century Italian translation].
- Enrico da Settimello. Elegia, ed. Giovanni Cremaschi. Bergamo: Istituto Italiano Edizioni Atlas, 1949.
- Arrigo da Settimello, Elegia, ed. Clara Fossati, Florence, 2011. [Latin with Italian translation].

== Bibliography ==
- "Arrighetto or Arrigo da Settimello". The Biographical Dictionary of the Society for the Diffusion of Useful Knowledge. Vol. 3. Longman, Brown, Green, and Longmans. 1844. pp. 642–643.
- Bonaventura, Enzo (1913). "Arrigo da Settimello e l'Elegia de diversitate fortunæ et philosophiæ consolatione". Studi medievali. IV: 110–192.
- Monteverdi, Angelo (1925). "Un Poeta italiano del secolo XII". Rivista d'Italia. XXVIII: 986–1001.
- Francesco Torraca, L'Elegia di Arrigo da Settimello, in Atti dell'Accademia di archeologia lettere e belle arti di Napoli, n. s., X (1926), pp. 257-280.
- Spagnolo, Giuseppe (1928). "La cultura letteraria di Arrigo da Settimello". Giornale Storico della Letteratura Italiana. XCIII: 1–68.
- Strecker, Karl (1929). "Henricus Septimellensis und die zeitgenössische Literatur". Studi medievali. II: 110–113.
- Cremaschi, Giovanni (1949). "Contributo allo studio della tradizione manoscritta di Enrico da Settimello". Aevum. 23 (1/2): 177–184. JSTOR 25820057.
- Cremaschi, Giovanni (1950). "Enrico da Settimello e la sua "Elegia"". Atti dell'Istituto Veneto di Scienze, Lettere ed Arti. CVIII: 177–206.
- Cioffari, Vincenzo (1938). "Fortune and Fate in the "Elegia" of Henricus Septimellensis". Romanic Review. XXXIX: 311–331.
- Zappacosta, Guglielmo (1986). "Arrigo da Settimello". In Vittore Branca; et al. (eds.). Dizionario critico della letteratura italiana. Vol. 1 (2 ed.). Turin: UTET. pp. 141–145.
- Dillon, John B. (2004). "Arrigo da Settimello". In Kleinhenz, Christopher (ed.). Medieval Italy: An Encyclopedia. Routledge. pp. 59–60. ISBN 9781135948801.
