= Qissat al-Iskandar =

First Arabic-language Alexander Romance

The Qiṣṣat al-Iskandar (fully the Qiṣṣat al-Iskandar wa-mā fīhā min al-amr al-ʿajīb, or "The story of Alexander and the wonderful things it contains") is the earliest narrative of Alexander the Great in the tradition of the Alexander Romance genre in the Arabic language. It was composed by ‘Umara ibn Zayd (also spelled Omâre Ebn-Zeyd) (767–815) between the late 8th to the early 9th century as a recension on the Syriac Alexander Legend. It is not to be confused with the Qissat Dhi'l-Qarnayn or the Sirat al-Iskandar.

The text offers a chain of transmission going back to the earliest days of Islam, claiming to rely on transmitters including Ka'b al-Ahbar, Ibn Abbas, Hasan al-Basri, Ibn Ishaq and others.

== Synopsis ==
In the Qissat al-Iskandar, Alexander the Great is depicted as a civilizing hero and monotheist that travels across the world, builds the Wall against Gog and Magog, searches for the Water of Life (Fountain of Youth), and encounters angels who give him a "wonder-stone" that both weighs more than any other stone but is also as light as dust. This text contains the core traditions of the Alexander Romance including Alexander's campaigns against Persia, India, the Amazon women, etc.; 'Umara follows the Greek tradition closely on these narratives, though he also provides extensive glosses to the Quranic account. However, it excludes the initial parts of the Romance and, like many later Islamic renditions of Alexander legends, begins with Alexander's confrontations with Darius of Persia. The text also contains uniquely Arabic and Islamic material, including an identification of the protagonist, Alexander, with the figure named Dhu'l-Qarnayn whom appears in Surat al-Kahf in the Quran. The people who live where the sun sets described in the Quran are identified by 'Umara as the Jābalqā people. Then, Alexander appears in the place of the rising sun, where he meets the people known as Jābarsā. The people who barely communicate between two mountains are identified as the Hāwīl, whose counterpart is the Tāwīl. The story describes the construction of the iron and clad wall at this location in detail. On these journeys encountering many groups of people, God grants Alexander proficiency in all languages. The story continues and speaks of a great number of more tales.

== Manuscripts ==
The composition is found in one sixteenth-century (1504) manuscript spanning 80 folios (or 160 pages) and was written by the scribe ‘Ubayd Allah Muḥammad b. ‘Abd al-Mun’im b. Muḥammad al-Anṣarī al-Khazrajī al-Malikī. It is currently being held at the British Museum as British Museum Add. 5928.
