= Land of Darkness =

Mythical land

The Land of Darkness (Arabic: ديار الظلمات romanized: Diyārī Zulūmāt) was a mythical land supposedly enshrouded in perpetual darkness. It was usually said to be in Abkhazia, and was officially known as Hanyson or Hamson (or some variation; the name apparently comes from the Hamshen area of Turkey), or simply the Forest of Abkhazia.

The Land of Darkness enjoyed popularity in medieval travel literature such as the Alexander Romance and the Travels of Sir John Mandeville. According to Mandeville, no one ventures into Hanyson out of fear, but the people in the surrounding area know it to be populated, as they can hear human voices inside. The residents of Hanyson are the descendants of Persian Emperor Saures (Shapur II) and his men, who were trapped there forever by a miracle of God. Saures had been persecuting his Christian subjects in Abkhazia, and had cornered them on a plain. They prayed to God, and God responded by surrounding the king's armies in the thick, impenetrable darkness that still affected the land. In the Alexander Romance, Alexander the Great crosses the Land of Darkness in his search for the Water of Life. After passing through Russia and coming almost to the edge of the world, Alexander finds the darkened country and travels it with his servant Andreas (in the Persian version of the Romance, this servant is identified with the enigmatic Quranic figure of al-Khidr). Alexander cannot find his way through the darkness, but his servant does. Andreas drinks of the Water of Life and becomes immortal. The same story is found in the Arabic tradition identifying Dhu al-Qarnayn with Alexander.

The Land of Darkness was also identified with the area around the northern Ural Mountains. When Abu Hamid al-Gharnati visited Volga Bulgaria in 1135-36, he was told that the Land of Darkness was not far from Yugra (or Yura).

Ibn Battuta was in the same area and wanted to visit the Land of Darkness but decided against it because it required a 40-day journey on "small wagons drawn by large dogs." Ahmad ibn Fadlan wrote a book about this, a tale titled Ibn Fadlān and the Land of Darkness: Arab Travellers in the Far North, a travelogue from 922 AD detailing ibn Fadlan's mission to travel from Baghdad to Volga Bulgaria.

== See also ==
- Ahmad ibn Fadlan
