= Alexander the Great in Arabic tradition =

Alexander the Great was the king of the Kingdom of Macedon and the founder of an empire that stretched from Greece to northwestern India. Legends surrounding his life quickly sprung up soon after his own death. His predecessors represented him in their coinage as the son of Zeus Ammon, wearing what would become the Horns of Alexander as originally signified by the Horns of Ammon. Legends of Alexander's exploits coalesced into the third-century Alexander Romance which, in the premodern period, went through over one hundred recensions, translations, and derivations and was translated into almost every European vernacular and every language of the Islamic world. After the Bible, it was the most popular form of European literature. It was also translated into every language from the Islamicized regions of Asia and Africa, from Mali to Malaysia.

The first appearance of Alexander traditions in Arabic literature occurs in the first extant Arabic book, the Quran, in its description of Dhu al-Qarnayn. Alexander was widely believed to be Dhu al-Qarnayn, and this identification is found in some of the earliest texts which discuss this, like the biography of Muhammad by Ibn Ishaq and the commentary on the Quran by Muqatil ibn Sulayman. Likewise, Alexandrian texts feature among the earliest known texts translated from other languages into Arabic, such as the Rasāʾil Arisṭāṭālīsa ilāʾl-Iskandar (The Letters of Aristotle to Alexander or the Epistolary Romance), consisting of a set of apocryphal letters meant to confirm Alexander's reputation as a wise ruler produced during the reign of Hisham ibn Abd al-Malik (r. 724–743) from sources originally in Greek. Versions of the Alexander Romance were repeatedly translated into Arabic from Syriac, Latin, and Hebrew throughout the Middle Ages and beyond, the most popular being the Sirat al-Iskandar. These stories about Alexander were believed to be historically factual by the people who transmitted them.

== Quran ==
=== Dhu al-Qarnayn ===
Alexander was often identified with Dhu al-Qarnayn (Arabic: ذو القرنين; lit. "The Two-Horned One"), a figure that appears in the Quran. This identification would play a role in enhancing the popularity of the Arabic Alexander tradition, which often made Alexander synonymous with his attributed Two-Horned title.

=== Other ===
Earlier in Surah al-Kahf, a pericope in the Quran presents Moses in search for the Fountain of Life (18:60–64). This pericope resembles earlier legends where Alexander the Great searches for the Fountain of Life in texts such as the Alexander Romance (in its Greek α recension from the third century), the Babylonian Talmud, and the Song of Alexander. Some studies have looked into why the protagonist was shifted from Alexander to Moses in the version as the narrative appears in the Quran.

Recently, Zishan Ghaffar has also argued for the role played by Alexander legends in shaping the narrative that appears in 27:15–44.

== Genres ==
=== Classification ===
Doufikar-Aerts has divided the Arabic Alexander literature into four categories or genres of literature. The first is the literature in the tradition of Pseudo-Callisthenes, or the 'Pseudo-Callisthenes tradition' or the Arabic Alexander Romance tradition, which focused on the biographical elements of Alexander's career. The second is the 'Alexander and Wisdom literature' tradition. The third is the Dhu al-Qarnayn tradition, related to texts from the Qisas al-Anbiya (Tales of the Prophets) literature. This tradition was rooted in the Quranic figure of Dhu al-Qarnayn. The fourth is the Sirāt al-Iskandar tradition, which follows in the tradition of a popular romance known as the Sīrat al-Iskandar.

=== Wisdom literature ===
The Alexander Romance also had an important influence on Arabic wisdom literature. Arabic was introduced as the court language of the caliphate during the Umayyad Caliphate around the year 700. One of the first texts translated into Arabic was the Rasāʾil Arisṭāṭālīsa ilāʾl-Iskandar (The Letters of Aristotle to Alexander or the Epistolary Romance), which consists of a set of apocryphal letters meant to confirm Alexander's reputation as a wise ruler. It was composed during the reign of Hisham ibn Abd al-Malik (r. 724–743) from Greek sources like the Epistola Alexandri ad Aristotelem.

Part of this text became a constituent of the Kitāb Sirr al-Asrār (Book of Secret of Secrets) by Yahya ibn al-Batriq (d. 815), a Pseudo-Aristoteliean treatise which became immensely popular and was translated directly from the Arabic into many other (including European) languages. Both Alexander and Aristotle became important figures in Islamic wisdom literature, such as in the chapter dedicated to Alexander in the 9th-century Ādāb al-Falāsifa (Sayings of the Philosophers) written in the name of the famous Christian translator and physician Hunayn ibn Ishaq. Other texts in this tradition from the tenth century onward included Ṣiwān al-Ḥikma (Chest of Wisdom) of Abu Sulayman Sijistani, the Al-Ḥikma al-Khālida (Everlasting Wisdom) of Miskawayh, and the Al-Kalim al-Rūḥānīya fīʾl-Ḥikam al-Yūnānīya (Spiritual Sayings about Greek Maxims) of Ibn Hindu.

Notably, the Abbasid caliph Al-Mu'tasim (794–842 AD) had ordered the translation of the Thesaurus Alexandri, a work on elixirs and amulets, from Greek and Latin into Arabic. The Greek work Thesaurus Alexandri was attributed to Hermes (the great messenger of the gods in Greek mythology) and similarly contained supposed letters from Aristotle addressed to Alexander.

In Secretum Secretorum ("Secret of Secrets", in Arabic Kitab sirr al-asrar), an encyclopedic Arabic treatise on a wide range of topics such as statecraft, ethics, physiognomy, alchemy, astrology, magic and medicine, Alexander appears as a speaker and subject of wise sayings and as a correspondent with figures such as Aristotle. The origins of the treatise are uncertain. No Greek original exists, though there are claims in the Arabic treatise that it was translated from the Greek into Syriac and from Syriac into Arabic by a well-known 9th century translator, Yahya ibn al-Bitriq (?–815 AD). It appears, however, that the treatise was actually composed originally in Arabic.

Another piece of Arabic Alexander literature is the Laments (or Sayings) of the Philosophers. These are a collection of remarks supposedly made by some philosophers gathered at the tomb of Alexander after his death. This legend was originally written in the 6th century in Syriac and was later translated into Arabic and expanded upon. The Laments of the Philosophers eventually gained enormous popularity in Europe.

=== Romance literature ===
The Syriac Alexander Romance, alongside some apocalyptic traditions it incorporated from the shorter Syriac Alexander Legend, would become the main source for Arabic Alexander Romance tradition and for Arabic-language historians who wanted to discuss the role of Alexander in pre-Islamic history. One such history was the Kitāb al-Akhbār al-Ṭiwal (Book of Comprehensive History) of Abu Hanifa Dinawari (d. 896), itself based on an older version in Pseudo-Aṣma‛ī's Nihāyat al-Arab (Ultimate Aim), includes a short history of the kingdom of Alexander in this tradition. Other examples include the Tārīkh (Historiae) of al-Yaʿqūbī (d. 897), the al-Rusul waʾl-Mulūk (History of the Prophets and Kings, or simply Annales) of al-Tabbari (d. 923), the Murūj al-Dhahab (Meadows of Gold) of al-Masudi (d. 956), and the Naẓm al-Jawhar (String of Pearls) of Eutychius of Alexandria.

The earliest full-length Arabic Alexander Romance was the Qissat al-Iskandar of ʿUmara ibn Zayd, composed in the late 8th or early 9th century. In the tale, Alexander the Great travels a great deal, builds the Wall against Gog and Magog, searches for the Water of Life (Fountain of Youth), and encounters angels who give him a "wonder-stone" that both weighs more than any other stone but is also as light as dust. This wonder-stone is meant to admonish Alexander for his ambitions and indicate that his lust for conquest and eternal life will not end until his death. The story of the wonder-stone is not found in the Syriac Christian legend, but is found in Jewish Talmudic traditions about Alexander as well as in Persian traditions.

The other prominent Arabic versions would be the Qissat Dhulqarnayn (9th century), a second Qissat Dhulqarnayn in the Ara'is al-majalis fi Qisas al-anbiya' (Book of Prophets) of al-Tha'labi (11th century), the Hadith Dhulqarnayn (15th century), the Sīrat al-Iskandar (15th century), the Sirat al-malek Eskandar Dhu’ l-Qarneyn, and the Tārīkh al-Iskandar al-Makdūni (History of Alexander of Macedon) (17th century).

=== Tales of the prophets ===
One figure transmitting Alexander legends in the tradition of the qiṣaṣ genre was Wahb ibn Munabbih, although this is according to an attribution later made by Ibn Hisham. According to Ibn Hisham, Dhu al-Qarnayn should be identified with a South Arabian king named Sa'b Dhu Marathid as opposed to Alexander, although Sa'b is a mythical figure whose biography is derivative from Alexander's in the tradition of Pseudo-Callisthenes. That Ibn Hisham's traditions go back to Wahb as he stated is doubtful. The Arabic story still describes the story of Alexander's Wall against Gog and Magog and his quest for the Water of Life. The story also mentions that Dhu al-Qarnayn visited a castle with glass walls and visited the Brahmins of India. The South Arabian legend was composed within the context of the division between the South Arabs and North Arabs that began with the Battle of Marj Rahit in 684 AD and consolidated over two centuries.

Another transmitter who Alexander traditions are attributed to was Ka'b al-Ahbar.

=== Sirat al-Iskandar ===
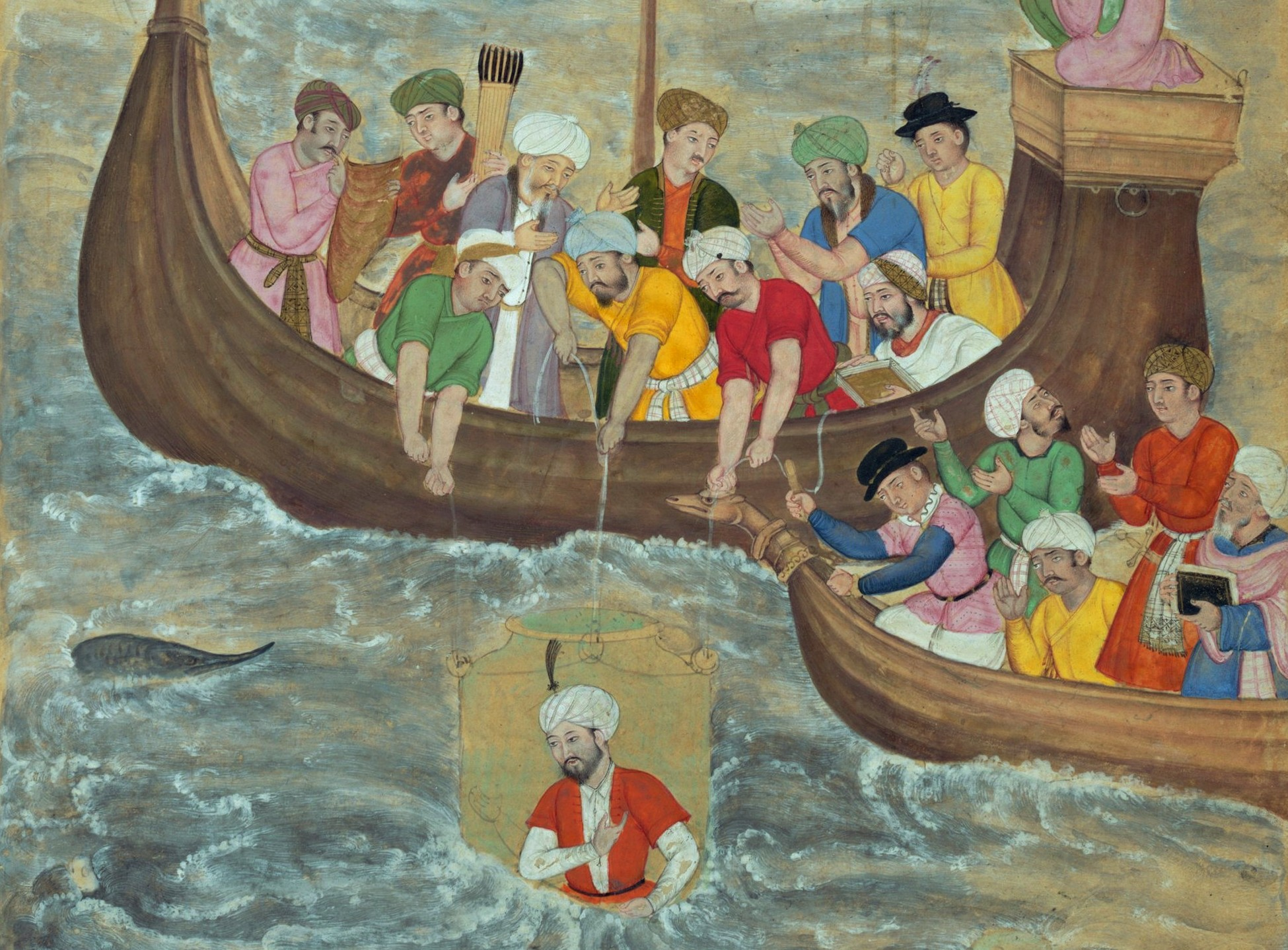
Detail of a 16th-century Islamic painting depicting Alexander being lowered in a glass submersible

The Sīrat al-Iskandar (Life of Alexander) is a 13th-century popular Arabic-language romance about Alexander the Great. It belongs to the sīra shaʿbiyya genre. In the Sīrat, Alexander is a son of Dārāb, a prince of the Achaemenid dynasty of Persia, and Nāhīd, daughter of King Philip II of Macedon. He is born in secret at Philip's court and is raised by Aristotle. He eventually succeeds Philip as king, while his half-brother Dārā succeeds to the Persian throne. They go to war and Alexander is victorious, with Dārā dying in his arms. After returning to Macedon, Alexander comes under the influence of the devil, Iblīs, until he is brought back to the right path by al-Khiḍr, who convinces him he has a divine mission: to convert the whole world to monotheism. The two travel first to the West and then to the East, converting people everywhere they go. Alexander then constructs the famous wall confining Gog and Magog before setting out for the Land of Darkness to find the Water of Life. He is prevented from reaching the water by the Isrāfīl (angels), who instead give him the wonderstone. Shortly after, Alexander writes a letter of consolation to his mother and dies. He is buried in Alexandria.

== Representations ==
Arabic literature produced stories about heroes, saints, poets, and men of wisdom. Biographies, romances, poems, and so forth celebrated literary protagonists, among them one of the most popular being Alexander the Great. While portraits and representations of Alexander in the Arab and Islamic tradition has continuity with earlier representations, it also developed its own nuances.

One representation was of Alexander as a strategist, especially in light of his vast conquests from such a small territory, including the subjugation of many lands that the Umayyads reconquered later. A group of apocryphal letters translated during the reign of the caliph Hisham between Alexander and Aristotle (Alexander's tutor) describes how Alexander was advised by Aristotle as to how he should go about his campaigns. These include recommendations in good government, rulership, fair treatment to subdued nations, and more. Though Alexander never pursued Arabia, the letters describe the Arabians as one of his subjects. One piece of advice was that Alexander should allow troops nightly drinking parties (a pre-Islamic recommendation which was not conformed into Islamic ethics in the text). These texts went on to have an enormous impact on Arabic-related Alexander traditions.

Another was that of the sage. This is especially visible in wisdom literature, which included wise sayings, maxims, anthologies of anecdotes, and ascriptions of exemplary conduct on great figures from the past. Such stories are rooted in Hellenistic sources and often remained closer to their originals during translation. The Greek historian Plutarch wrote in his "On the Fortune or Virtue of Alexander the Great" argued that Alexander would qualify as a true philosopher by the same criteria used to judge others like Pythagoras and Socrates: by judging him based on his manner of life and the principles he taught. Maxims emphasizing the greater nature of what Alexander gained from Aristotle, in knowledge, over what he gained from his father Philip, in weaponry, was repeated by the Arabic compiler Mubashshir ibn Fatik; Mubashshir recorded a maxim where when Alexander asked if he valued his teacher or father more, he answered "My father is the cause of my life, but my teacher is the cause of the quality of my life". Representations of Alexander as a philosopher king were widespread. Another text where they can also be found in Hunayn ibn Ishaq's Anecdotes of Philosophers and Sages.

Alexander as a pioneer was another popular portrait. In the Arabic Epistola Alexandri, Alexander describes his personal observations during his journeys. He constructs temples for prayer and was seen as a proto-monotheist foreshadowing the coming of Christianity and Islam. His exploits were depicted as deeds of cleverness and boldness, and the result of divine providence. He sent many letters to the rulers of foreign nations in order to compel them into monotheism.

== Geography and cartography ==
One of the most famous elements of Alexander's biography was his concealment of Gog and Magog behind a barrier which they remain imprisoned by until the end of the world. Such ideas caught the attention of geographers, who were interested in finding these barriers or representing them in the maps they produced. Like in medieval Christendom, medieval world maps, also known as mappa mundi, were produced which depicted Gog and Magog in the far corners of the Earth. One tenth-century Arab geographer and chronicler, Ibn Hawqal, produced maps based on his own travels and inspired by earlier ones by Ptolemy. His map was part of his geographical work, the Ṣūrat al-ʾArḍ ("Image of the Earth"), a manuscript for which exists dating to 1086. The "regions of Gog and Magog" in this map is situated in the northwestern part of the world. Muhammad al-Idrisi was an Arab geographer who, in 1154, was commissioned by the Norman king Roger II of Sicily into producing a work that came to be known in Western languages as the Tabula Rogeriana (or "The Excursion of One Eager to Penetrate the Distant Horizons" in Arabic). In this map, a considerable part of the world is in the northernmost section and is inhabited by Gog and Magog. One copy of this map known as the Charta Rogeriana depicts Gog and Magog as being enclosed by a mountain range called the jabal Qūfāia and has an Arabic caption in a Latinized script which reads sadd ḏī 'l karnajin, al musamma bi al rad[ ] (radm?), "The Barrier of Dhū 'l-Qarnayn, called the Rampart". The words sadd and radm were taken from the Quran, 18:94, 95. This practice was followed into Iranian maps, such as the fifteenth-century Mojmal al-Tawārīkh wa 'l-Qeṣaṣ.

Several expeditions in the Muslim world were undertaken to try to find and study Alexander's wall, specifically the Caspian Gates of Derbent. An early expedition to Derbent was ordered by the Caliph Umar (d. 644) himself, during the Arab conquest of Armenia where they heard about Alexander's Wall in Derbent from the conquered Christian Armenians, according to the exegetes Al-Tabarani (873–970 AD) and Ibn Kathir (1301–1373 AD), and by the Muslim geographer Yaqut al-Hamawi (1179–1229 AD):

... Umar sent ... in 22 A.H. [643 AD] ... an expedition to Derbent [Russia] ... `Abdur Rahman bin Rabi`ah [was appointed] as the chief of his vanguard. When 'Abdur Rehman entered Armenia, the ruler Shehrbaz surrendered without fighting. Then when `Abdur Rehman wanted to advance towards Derbent, Shehrbaz [ruler of Armenia] informed him that he had already gathered full information about the wall built by Dhul-Qarnain, through a man, who could supply all the necessary details ...

Two hundred years later, the Abbasid Caliph Al-Wathiq (d. 847) dispatched an expedition to study the wall of Dhu al-Qarnayn in Derbent, Russia. The expedition was led by Sallam-ul-Tarjuman, whose observations were recorded by Yaqut al-Hamawi and by Ibn Kathir:

...this expedition reached ... the Caspian territory. From there they arrived at Derbent and saw the wall [of Dhul-Qarnayn].

The Muslim geographer Yaqut al-Hamawi further confirmed the same view in a number of places in his book on geography; for instance under the heading "Khazar" (Caspian) he writes:

This territory adjoins the Wall of Dhul-Qarnain just behind Bab-ul-Abwab, which is also called Derbent.

The Caliph Harun al-Rashid (763 – 809 AD) even spent some time living in Derbent. Not all Muslim travellers and scholars, however, associated Dhul-Qarnayn's wall with the Caspian Gates of Derbent. For example, the Muslim explorer Ibn Battuta (1304–1369 AD) travelled to China on order of the Sultan of Delhi, Muhammad bin Tughluq and he comments in his travel log that "Between it [the city of Zaitun in Fujian] and the rampart of Yajuj and Majuj [Gog and Magog] is sixty days' travel." The translator of the travel log notes that Ibn Battuta confused the Great Wall of China with that supposedly built by Dhul-Qarnayn.

== Translations ==
An Arabic translation of Pseudo-Callisthenes is evidenced by the Akhbār Al-Iskandar, a brief biography. This text in turn is known from the Mukhtār al-Ḥikam wa-Maḥāsin al-Kalim ('Selection of Proverbs and an Anthology of Sayings') by Mubashshir ibn Fātik. In Europe, this text was known as the Bocados de Oro. The question of the source language for the major Arabic version of Pseudo-Callisthenes, however, has been contentious. According to Theodor Nöldeke in the late 19th century, the lost δ recension of the Greek Romance was translated into Middle Persian (Pahlavi). The Pahlavi version, also lost, was translated into Syriac as the Syriac Alexander Romance and it was the Syriac version that was the ultimate source of the Arabic sometime before the 9th century. More recently, this theory has been questioned and others have suggested that a translation could have been made directly from the Greek.

In Latin, a version of the Alexander Romance known as the Historia de preliis was produced as a recension of the earlier tenth-century Nativitas et victoria Alexandri Magni regis produced by Leo the Archpriest. The Hebrew translation of this text is thought to have been produced not directly from the Latin, but from a now-lost Arabic intermediary translation that must have been produced prior to 1061.

The Tārīkh al-Iskandar al-Makdūni (History of Alexander of Macedon), translated into Arabic by the Melkite bishop Yuwāsif ibn Suwaydān (c. 1669) from the Byzantine ζ-recension of Pseudo-Callisthenes. It is fairly late and so had little influence on the Arabic Alexander tradition.

== History of scholarship ==
The study of the Arabic tradition of the Alexander Romance was founded by Theodor Nöldeke with his publication Beiträge zur geschichte des Alexanderromans in 1890. In 1901, Karl Friederich Weymann published a study on translations of the Romance into Arabic and Ethiopic, titled Die aethiopische und arabische Übersetzung des Pseudocallisthenes. In this study, Weymann proposed a tentative reconstruction of an Arabic version of the Romance which might have served as an intermediary between the Syriac and Ethiopic versions. He dated the Arabic translation, which he thought must exist, to the first half of the 9th century. However, the existence of an Arabic translation would remain conjectural until the accidental discovery of a manuscript of the Hadith Dhulqarnayn (or the Leyenda de Alejandro) in 1929 by Emilio Garcia Gomez. This constituted definitive evidence for the translation, and also demonstrated the importance of the Syriac recension in the transmission of the Romance into Arabic.

Another strand of scholarship focused on Dhu al-Qarnayn traditions, such as Mark Lidzbarski who published an Arabic 'Alexandergeschichte' or, a chapter on Dhu al-Qarnayn, from the Kitab at-Tījān (Book of Crowns) of Ibn Hisham in 1893. Lidzbarski believed that the ultimate (though not direct) source for the traditions in Ibn Hisham's work, at least respect to its description of the Fountain of Life, was to be sought in the Epic of Gilgamesh. Ibn Hisham imputed the traditions he described to a Yemenite king known as Sa'b Dhu Marathid, but Lidzbarski understood that the traditions about Sa'b are derived from traditions of Alexander the Great in the Romance tradition. In 1913, Friedlaender published his volume Die Chadhirlegende und der Alexanderroman, the main topic of which was the fountain of life traditions but was also very informative about a variety of other topics. Despite its importance, the book did not exert much influence on scholarship until later due to the attitude that existed that scholarly work on the Arabic Alexander tradition from the 19th century had already resolved the major questions. After the first half of the 20th century, renewed attention came to the Arabic tradition. One of the primary contributors from this period was Mario Grignaschi; one of his primary contributions was the sensational discovery of a manuscript from the Aya Sofya collection of an Arabic adaptation of the Epistolary Romance cycle, a fictionalized correspondence between Alexander and Aristotle. It was composed during the reign of the caliph Hisham ibn Abd al-Malik in the first half of the 8th century. This finding also confirmed Alexander's place and importance in the Arabic Wisdom literature.

In 1978, Tilman Nagel published his Alexander der Grosse in der frühislamischen Volksliteratur. Nagel pioneered a new way with dealing with the material in Ibn Hisham's Kitab, forsaking the older method of the comparative study of legend and instead aimed at deducing the earliest sources and origins of the different elements of the narrative. He also placed the work in its historical and social context, viewing it as an autonomous literary phenomena that occupied a particular national consciousness. His work would anticipate additional innovations in the study of popular Arabic literature towards the end of the 20th century. In these decades, a few short surveys appeared of the oriental Arabic tradition, including that of Stephen Gero, Hamad Bin Seray, and a proceedings of a congress on Alexander published by Fahd, Mazzaoui, Macuch, and Marin. Other recent developments include the work of the historian François de Polignac and, most importantly of all, the edition and translation of Islamic Legends Concerning Alexander the Great by Z. David Zuwiyya.

Today, the Arabic tradition of Alexander legends is the best-research of all divisions of the eastern tradition about Alexander, in large (but not exclusive) part to the more recent contributions by Faustina Doufikar-Aerts, such as in her book Alexander Magnus Arabicus.

== See also ==
- Alexander the Great in Islamic tradition
- Song of Alexander
