= Alexander the Great in legend =

Legendary accounts surrounding the life of Alexander the Great

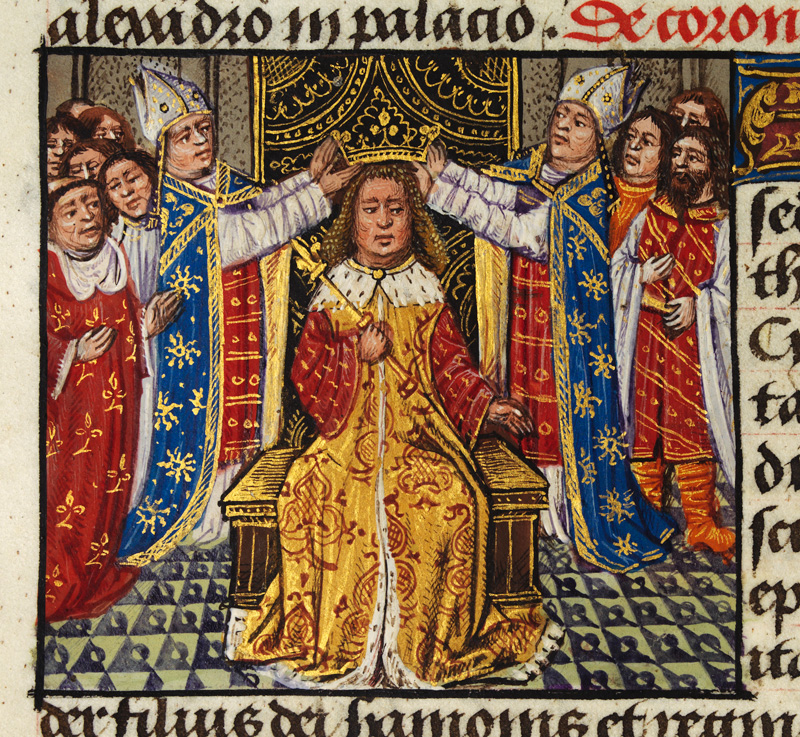
The coronation of Alexander depicted in medieval European style in the 15th century romance The History of Alexander's Battles.

The vast conquests of the Macedonian king Alexander the Great quickly inspired the formation and diffusion of legendary material about his deity, journeys, and tales. These appeared shortly after his death, and some may have already begun forming during his lifetime. Common themes and symbols among legends about Alexander include the Gates of Alexander, the Horns of Alexander, and the Gordian Knot.

In the third century AD, an anonymous author writing in the name of Alexander's court historian Callisthenes (commonly referred to as Pseudo-Callisthenes) authored the Greek Alexander Romance. This work gave rise to a genre of literature chronicling the myths and adventures of Alexander, which evolved through over a hundred versions during premodern times and was translated into nearly every language across European and Islamic civilizations.

== Greek tradition ==
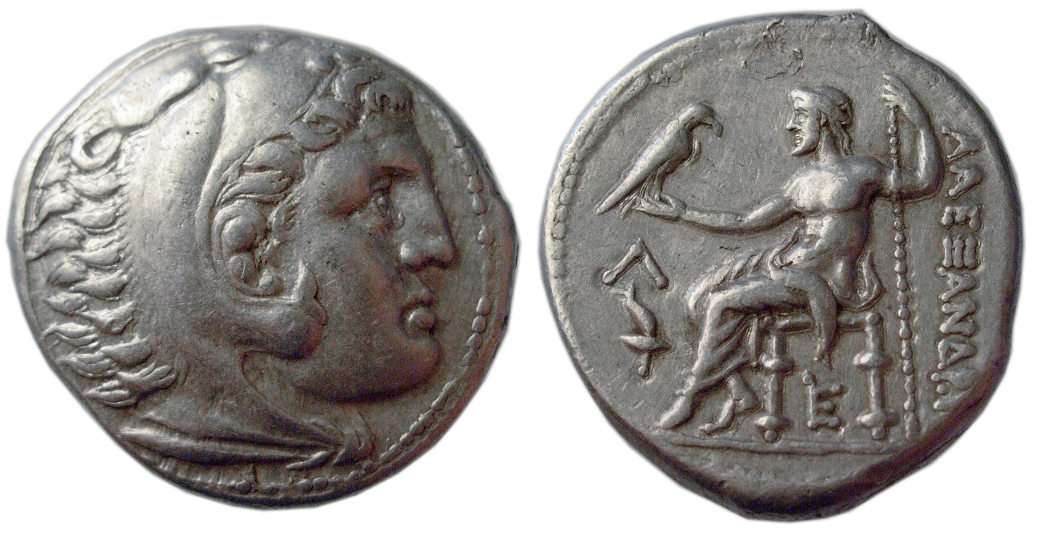
Posthumously issued silver tetradrachm of Alexander III with the inscription ΑΛΕΞΑΝΔΡΟΥ 'of Alexander'; Archaeological Museum of Amphipolis

=== Prophesied conqueror ===
King Philip II had a dream in which he took a wax seal and sealed up the womb of his wife. The seal bore the image of a lion. The seer Aristander interpreted this to mean that Olympias was pregnant, since men do not seal up what is empty, and that she would bring forth a son who would be bold and lion-like.

After Philip took Potidaea in 356 BC, he received word that his horse had just won at the Olympic games, and that Parmenion had defeated the Illyrians. Then he got word of the birth of Alexander. The seers told him that a son whose birth coincided with three victories would always be victorious. When the young Alexander tamed the steed Bucephalus, his father noted that Macedonia would not be large enough for him.

=== Deification ===
When Alexander went to Egypt, he was given the title of Pharaoh and the epithet "Son of Ra" (the Egyptian sun deity). In 331 BC in Egypt, he would visit the oracle of the Siwa Oasis (also known as the Oasis of Amun-Ra). It was at that point, legend holds, that Alexander began to refer to Zeus Ammon as his true father. Returning to Memphis after the oracle visit, he was informed that the prophetess of the Apollonian oracle, the Erythraean Sibyl, had also confirmed his divine paternity as the son of Zeus.

=== Apocryphal letters ===
- Leon of Pella wrote the work On the Gods in Egypt on the basis of an apocryphal letter sent from Alexander to his mother Olympias.
- The Epistola Alexandri ad Aristotelem, described as being a letter sent from Alexander to his mentor Aristotle, concerning his adventures in India.

=== Plutarch ===
Many Alexander legends are found in the writings of the Greek historian Plutarch, such as that Alexander was born in the same day that the Temple of Artemis at Ephesus was burnt down, during which the god Artemis was too preoccupied with his birth to pay the requisite attention needed to save her burning temple. Later in life when Alexander offered to pay for the temple's reconstruction, he was informed that it was not appropriate for gods to dedicate offerings to other gods. In another anecdote, it was said that the priestess of the Temple of Apollo in Delphi exclaimed to him "You are invincible o young!"

=== In Thessalonica ===
In medieval Thessalonica, the largest city in the region of Macedonia, a popular legend arose among the inhabitants of the city connecting Alexander with the sculptures of a Roman-era portico of the city known as Las Incantadas ("the enchanted ones"), which had been erected long after his death. According to the legend, a Thracian king once visited Alexander, and his queen fell in love with him. They arranged to meet at night next to the portico, but the king learnt of this, and had his magician bewitch the portico so that everyone who passed near would be petrified. Alexander was notified not to go by his tutor Aristotle, but the queen and her attendants were not as lucky, and they turned all into sculptures. The king and his magician arrived later to see their work, and they were petrified too.

A popular Greek legend has it that Thessalonike became a mermaid who lived in the Aegean after the death of Alexander the Great. The legend states that Alexander, in his quest for the Fountain of Life, retrieved with great exertion a flask of immortal water. In some versions of the story, he used the water to wash his sister's hair, making her immortal; in others, he forgot to tell her the contents of the flask and so used it to water a wild onion plant. When Alexander died his grief-stricken sister attempted to end her life by jumping into the sea. Instead of drowning, however, she became a mermaid who passes judgment on mariners throughout the centuries and across the seven seas. To the sailors who encounter her, she always poses the same question: "Is king Alexander alive?" (Greek: Ζει ο βασιλεύς Αλέξανδρος;), to which the correct answer would be "He lives and reigns and conquers the world" (Greek: Ζει και βασιλεύει, και τον κόσμο κυριεύει!). Given this answer, she would allow the ship and her crew to sail safely away in calm seas. Any other answer would transform her into the raging Gorgon, bent on sending the ship and every sailor on board to the bottom of the sea.

=== Claudius Aelianus ===
Claudius Aelianus in the Characteristics of Animals wrote that Scythians say that there were horned donkeys, and their horns were holding water from the river Styx. Adding that Sopater brought one of these horns to Alexander, then Alexander set up the horn as a votive offering at Delphi, with an inscription beneath it.

== Indian legends ==
Authentic information brought back by participants in the Indian campaign of Alexander the Great was "refashioned" by contemporary writers who had not been to India and "reinterpreted" in the centuries that followed until in late antiquity there appeared a series of Indian tractates, apocryphal descriptions of India, often interpolated into the Alexander Romance.

In India, the Hunza rulers claimed Alexander the Great as their ancestor.

== Jewish tradition ==
=== Josephus ===
Josephus, a first-century historian, describes the Gates of Alexander (and is the first to mention them after Pliny the Elder). Josephus describes these gates in the context of a barbarian group called the Scythians, for whom the boundary prevents their incursion. Elsewhere, Josephus also clarifies that the Scythians were known among the Jews as Magogites, descendants of the Magog described in the Hebrew Bible. These references occur in two different works. The Jewish War states that the iron gates Alexander erected were controlled by the king of Hyrcania (on the south edge of the Caspian), and allowing passage of the gates to the Alans (whom Josephus considered a Scythic tribe) resulted in the sack of Media. Josephus's Antiquities of the Jews contains two relevant passages, one giving the ancestry of Scythians as descendants of Magog son of Japheth, and another that refers to the Caspian Gates being breached by Scythians allied to Tiberius during the Armenian War.

=== Talmud ===
The Talmud also has many legends relating to Alexander, For example, it mentions that the Samaritans conspired for the destruction of the temple, but Alexander prostrated himself at the feet of the high priest Simon the Just. It also mentions many other legends on Alexander, such as the Ten Questions of Alexander to the Sages of the South, his Journey to the Regions of Darkness, the Amazons, the Gold Bread, Alexander at the Gate of Paradise, his Ascent into the Air, and Descent into the Sea.

The Talmud also records a story that describes Alexander seeking the Fountain of Life, which also has versions appear in the Alexander Romance and in the Syriac Song of Alexander. In the version as it appears in the Talmud, Alexander washes a fish in a spring which immediately jumps to life upon being washed. Realizing that he has discovered the Fountain, he washes his own face in it, though the significance of this is not explained in the story. The Talmudic version differs from the other versions, insofar as only in the Talmud does Alexander succeed in accessing the Fountain, and in this story, Alexander is the one to discover it as opposed to one of his servants.

== European tradition ==
=== Alexander sees the world ===
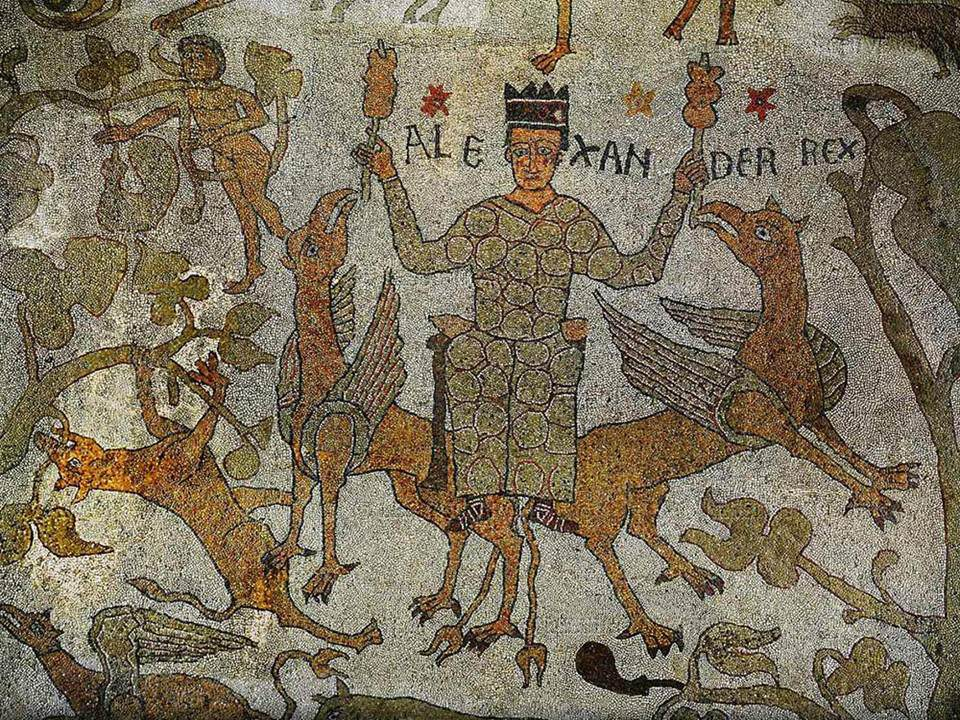
Alexander the Great carried aloft by griffins, Otranto Cathedral floor mosaic

Wishing to see the world, Alexander was thought to have descended into the depths of the ocean in a sort of diving bell. Then in order to see the world from above he harnessed two large griffins between which he was seated. He would hold meat skewers above their heads to entice them to keep flying further up.

Around 1260, Bertold von Regensburg preached, that like Alexander believed that "he could take down the highest stars from the sky by hand, so you too would like to go up in the air if you could." But the story showed where such a climb would lead, and proved that the great Alexander "was one of the greatest fools the world has ever seen."

Rice and Boardman have both argued that the figure on the Anglo-Saxon Alfred Jewel intended to represent this scene in order to represent the notion of one coming to knowledge through sight. Boardman has also argued that the Anglo-Saxon Fuller Brooch carries a similar theme.

=== Slavic folk tales ===
In the Bulgarian folk songs collection published by Dimitar and Konstantin Miladinov in 1861, under the chapter Legends, the first legend is about Tsar Aleksandar seeking the Immortal Water. The tale is recorded in what seems to be an Ohrid-Struga dialect. In the legend, Alexander finds the immortal water behind after walking three days in darkness, behind two mountains that open and close. He leaves the bottle with immortal water to his sister, who breaks it by accident. Alexander chases his sister to the sea, where she escapes and turns into a dolphin.

== Arabic tradition ==
With the Greek Alexander Romance and its translation into numerous languages including Armenian, Syriac, Arabic, Persian, Ethiopic, and more, an entire genre of literature was dedicated to the exploits of Alexander in both Christian and Muslim realms. Alexander was also the one most frequently identified with Dhu al-Qarnayn (Arabic: ذو القرنين; lit. "The Two-Horned One"), a figure that appears in Surah Al-Kahf in the Quran, the holy text of Islam, which greatly expanded the attention paid to him in the traditions of the Muslim world.

Arabic was introduced as the court language of the caliphate during the Umayyad Caliphate around the year 700. One of the first texts translated into Arabic was the Rasāʾil Arisṭāṭālīsa ilāʾl-Iskandar (The Letters of Aristotle to Alexander or the Epistolary Romance), which consist of a letter of apocryphal letters meant to confirm Alexander's reputation as a wise ruler. It was composed during the reign of Hisham ibn Abd al-Malik (r. 724–743) from Greek sources like the Epistola Alexandri ad Aristotelem. Part of this text became a constituent of the Kitāb Sirr al-Asrār (Book of Secret of Secrets) by Yahya ibn al-Batriq (d. 815), a Pseudo-Aristoteliean treatise which became immensely popular and was translated directly from the Arabic into many other (including European) languages. Both Alexander and Aristotle became important figures in Islamic wisdom literature, such as in the chapter dedicated to Alexander in the 9th-century Ādāb al-Falāsifa (Sayings of the Philosophers) written in the name of the famous Christian translator and physician Hunayn ibn Ishaq. Other texts in this tradition from the tenth century onward included Ṣiwān al-Ḥikma (Chest of Wisdom) of Abu Sulayman Sijistani, the al-Ḥikma al-Khālida (Everlasting Wisdom) of Miskawayh, and the al-Kalim al-Rūḥānīya fīʾl-Ḥikam al-Yūnānīya (Spiritual Sayings about Greek Maxims) of Ibn Hindu.

The Alexander Romance literature would enter into the Arabic world through its Syriac language recension (version), known as the Syriac Alexander Legend. It would become the main source for Arabic-language historians who wanted to discuss the role of Alexander in pre-Islamic history. For example, the Kitāb al-Akhbār al-Ṭiwal (Book of Comprehensive History) of Abu Hanifa Dinawari (d. 896), itself based on an older version in Pseudo-Aṣma‛ī's Nihāyat al-Arab (Ultimate Aim), includes a short history of the kingdom of Alexander in this tradition. Other examples include the Tārīkh (Historiae) of al-Yaʿqūbī (d. 897), the al-Rusul waʾl-Mulūk (History of the Prophets and Kings, or simply Annales) of al-Tabbari (d. 923), the Murūj al-Dhahab (Meadows of Gold) of al-Masudi (d. 956), and the Naẓm al-Jawhar (String of Pearls) of Eutychius of Alexandria.

The earliest full-length Arabic Alexander Romance was the Qissat al-Iskandar of ʿUmara ibn Zayd, composed in the late 8th or early 9th century. The other prominent Arabic versions would be the Qissat Dhulqarnayn (9th century), a second Qissat Dhulqarnayn in the Ara'is al-Majalis fi Qisas al-Anbiya' (Book of Prophets) of al-Tha'labi (11th century), the Hadith Dhulqarnayn (15th century), the Sīrat al-Iskandar (15th century), the Sirat al-Malek Eskandar Dhu’ l-Qarneyn, and the Tārīkh al-Iskandar al-Makdūni (History of Alexander of Macedon) (17th century).

== Persian tradition ==
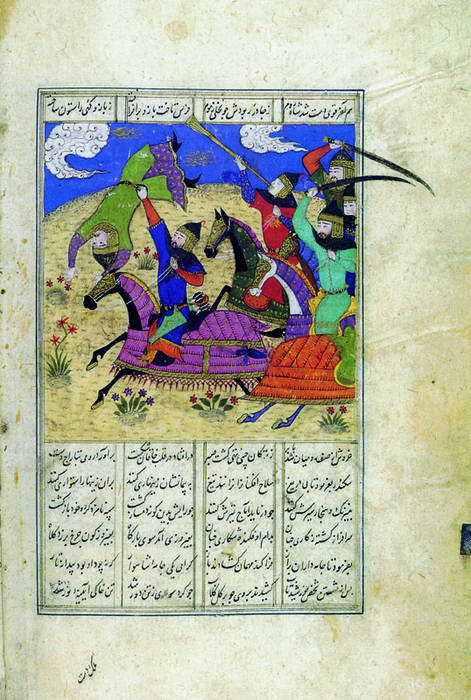
Eskandar fighting the enemy, 15th century Persian miniature, Czartoryski Museum

Pre-Islamic Persian tradition of Alexander is overwhelmingly negative, as in the Book of Arda Viraf and the Bundahishn. In these texts, Alexander is the enemy of Iran and of true religion. For example, the former text at one point says: "Then the accursed, wicked Evil Spirit deluded the accursed (gizistag) Alexander the Roman, who lived in Egypt, in order to cause the people to have doubt about this religion." Early Islamic representations of Alexander retain some vestige of such views, as Alexander is occasionally called a gizistag in the Shahnameh. Theodor Nöldeke has also inferred the existence of a now-lost Middle Persian recension of the Alexander Romance, which he believed was translated into Syriac as the Syriac Alexander Romance, but more recent scholarship has cast doubt on the existence of such an intermediary.

Islamic-era Persian accounts of the Alexander legend, known as the Iskandarnameh, combined the Pseudo-Callisthenes and Syriac material about Alexander, some of which is found in the Qur'an, with Sasanian Persian ideas about Alexander the Great. This is an ironic outcome considering Zoroastrian Persia's hostility to the national enemy who finished the Achaemenid Empire, but was also directly responsible for centuries of Persian domination by Hellenistic "foreign rulers". However, he is sometimes not depicted as a warrior and conqueror, but as a seeker of truth who eventually finds the Ab-i Hayat (Water of Life). Persian sources on the Alexander legend devised a mythical genealogy for him whereby his mother was a concubine of Darius II, making him the half-brother of the last Achaemenid king, Darius III. By the 12th century such important writers as Nezami Ganjavi were making him the subject of their epic poems. The Romance and the Syriac Legend are also the sources of incidents in Ferdowsi's Shahnameh. In the Shahnameh, the Persian epic, Kai Bahman's elder son Dara(b) is killed in battle with Alexander the Great, that is, Dara/Darab is identified as Darius III and which then makes Bahman a figure of the 4th century BC. In another tradition, Alexander is the son of Dara/Darab and his wife Nahid, who is described to be the daughter of "Filfus of Rûm" i.e. "Philip the Greek" (cf. Philip II of Macedon).

== Circassian tradition ==
Circassians had vines growing right in their gardens twining round fruit trees and yielding extremely rich fruit. The Circassian tradition of wine-making has its roots far back, and did not disappear after they adopted Islam, which is known not to welcome wine. Circassians had trees that were planted here, as the legend runs, by Alexander the Great. As early as the 17th century, the Ottoman traveler Evliya Çelebi described an enormous sacred tree that Circassians had:

The tree that this tribe worships is in a green valley located further south of their pişköv. Its poplar-like leaves block the sky, but it is not a poplar tree. The leaves are yellow and smell of musk and saffron crocus, having an almost round shape. When rubbed in hands, its pleasant scent stays on for a week. Moreover, some crafty Circassians put these leaves in their clothes, making them smell like saffron. People take these leaves as gifts from one place to another because their colour or scent does not fade even in a hundred years.

When Çelebi asked about the origins of this tree to the elders of the Ademeys and Nogais, they answered:

"When İskender-i Zülkarneyn (Alexander the Two-Horned) built Sedd-i Ye'cuc (the Wall of Gog) and stopped here, the Angel Gabriel brought this tree to İskender from heaven, saying, 'O İskender, Allah greets you. He sent this tree as a gift. It is sapling of the Tubā tree (a tree in heaven). You shall plant it here so that it stays until the doomsday and you and those who came after you shall pray under this pure tree.' As such, the Angel Gabriel brought this tree from heaven. The Prophet İskender dug the ground and Hızır planted the tree. That is why we burn wax candles and worship under this tree."

This humble one said:

"Did Allah ask [him] to worship this tree?"

"We do not know that much. Yet, this is what we have seen from our ancestors and this is how we do it." As such, they are a sort of people who believe in their ancestors' religion.

Similarly, when Çelebi visited a cave of treasures in the Ademey lands located somewhere close to the source of the Pshekops River and "protected by a bronze silhouette of a giant man holding a mace", the Ademey elders explained the spell by referring to Islamic terminology:

"After İskender-i Zülkarneyn built the Iron Wall against Gog and Magog using various ores and minerals, he came to the present cave and cast this spell. Then, he hoarded all of his treasures here and went on to connect the Black Sea to the Mediterranean."

Many researchers have attempted to search for the treasury mentioned by Çelebi over the centuries, but the searches yielded no result.

== Alexander Romance ==
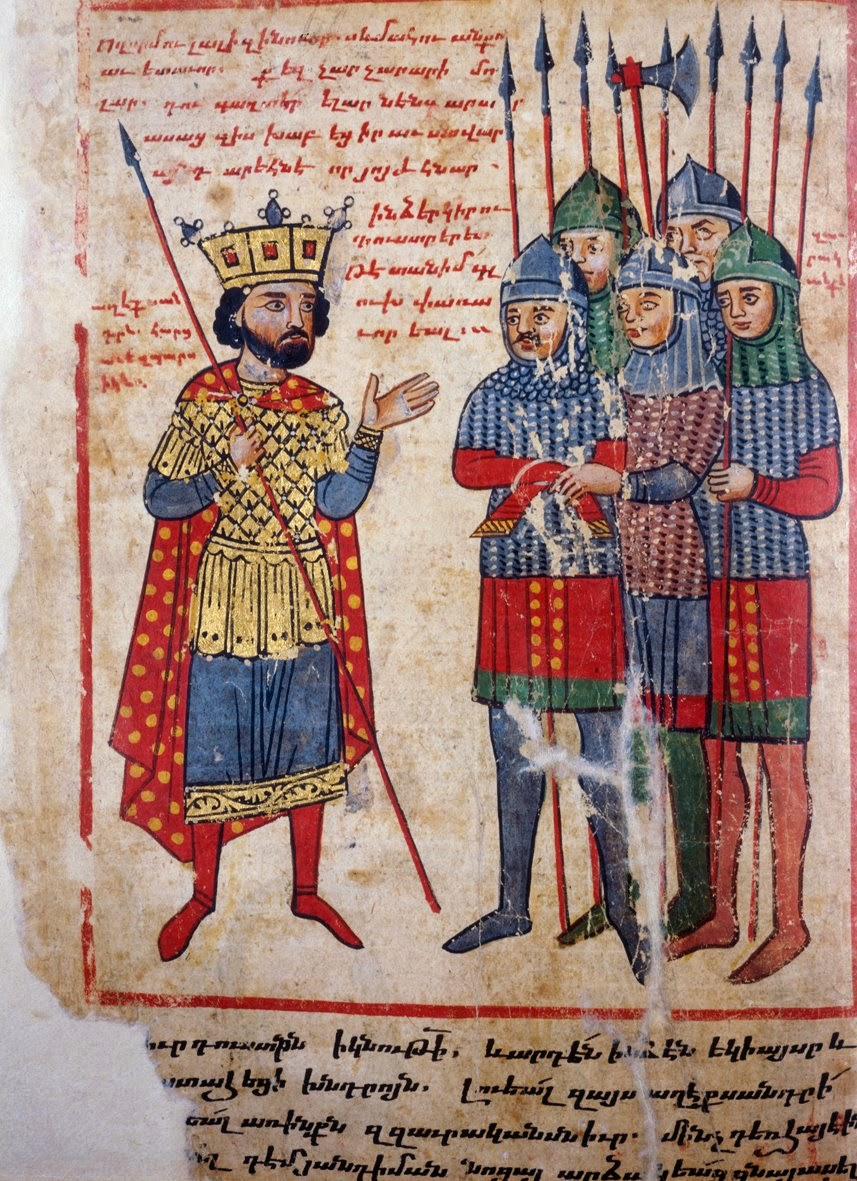
Alexander Romance,14th century Armenian illuminated manuscript.

In the third-century AD, a quantity of legendary and historical material about Alexander the Great coalesced into the production of a text known as the Alexander Romance. The text is pseudonymously attributed to Callisthenes, a court historian of Alexander the Great. For this reason, its author is usually referred to as Pseudo-Callisthenes.

In premodern times, the Alexander Romance underwent more than 100 translations, elaborations, and derivations in 25 languages, including almost all European vernaculars as well as in every language from the Islamicised regions of Asia and Africa, from Mali to Malaysia.

In Europe, the Alexander Romance was forgotten until Leo the Archpriest discovered a Greek copy in Constantinople while he was on a diplomatic missions. He produced a translation into Latin titled the Nativitas et victoria Alexandri Magni regis, which became the basis of the far more successful and expanded version known as the Historia de Proeliis, which went through three recensions between the twelfth and fifteenth centuries and made Alexander a household name throughout the Middle Ages. Another very popular Latin version was the Alexandreis of Walter of Châtillon.

Translations would subsequently be made into all the major languages of Europe as versions of the Alexander romance became the most popular form of medieval European literature after the Bible, such as Old French (12th century), Middle Scots (The Buik of Alexander, 13th century), Italian, Spanish (the Libro de Alexandre), Central German (Lamprecht's Alexanderlied, and a 15th-century version by Johannes Hartlieb), Slavonic, Hungarian, Romanian, Irish, and more.

The Syriac Alexander Legend, composed either in ~630 shortly after Heraclius defeated the Persians or in the mid-6th century during the reign of Justinian I, contains additional motifs not found in the earliest Greek version of the Romance, including the apocalypticization of the wall built against Gog and Magog. Subsequent Middle Eastern recensions of the Alexander legend were generated in the tradition of the Syriac recension, including versions in Arabic, Persian (Iskandarnameh), Ethiopic, Hebrew (in the first part of Sefer HaAggadah), Ottoman Turkish (14th century), and Middle Mongolian (13th-14th century).

=== Eastern reception ===
==== Quran ====
Alexander is Lowered into the Sea, from a Khamsa of Amir Khusrau Dihlavi, an illustrated manuscript from Mughal Empire, attributed to Mukanda c. 1597-98, Metropolitan Museum of Art

Alexander is often identified with Dhu al-Qarnayn, literally "The Two-Horned One", mentioned in the Quran, Al-Kahf 18:83–94. Similarities between the Quranic account and the Syriac Alexander Legend were also found in recent research (see Alexander in the Qur'an). The Arabic tradition also elaborated the legend that Alexander the Great had been the companion of Aristotle and Plato.

==== Persian tradition ====
Persian versions of the Alexander Romance began with depictions covering three sections of Ferdowsi's Shahnameh (Book of Kings). The first full length Persian recension of the Romance appeared in an anonymous work entitled the Iskandarnameh, likely dating to the eleventh century. Nizami Ganjavi would then compose his own Iskandarnameh under significant influence from the representations of Ferdowsi's chronicle. The next major Persian version was the Ayina-i Iskandari (Alexandrine Mirror) of the poet Amir Khusrau, who began first by surveying the earlier works of Ferdowsi and Nizami before proceeding into his own portrait. The final major Persian version was the Kherad-name-ye Eskandari (Alexandrian Book of Wisdom) of Jâmi composed in the 15th century, though numerous other versions would also continue to be written.

==== Malay tradition ====
The Malay Hikayat Iskandar Zulkarnain was written about Alexander the Great as Dhul-Qarnayn and the ancestry of several Southeast Asian royal families is traced from Iskandar Zulkarnain, through Raja Rajendra Chola (Raja Suran, Raja Chola) in the Malay Annals, such as the Sumatra Minangkabau royalty.

=== Western reception ===
Western epics based on the Alexander Romance include:

- Alexandreis (Latin)
- Alexanderlied (German)
- Buik of Alexander (Middle Scots)
- Li romans d'Alixandre (French)
- Libro de Alexandre (Spanish)
- Alexanders saga (Old Norse-Icelandic)

== See also ==
- Dhu al-Qarnayn
- Mythography
- Historiography of Alexander the Great
- History of Greece
- Cultural depictions of Alexander the Great
