= Ethiopic Alexander Romance =

The Ethiopic Alexander Romance, also known as the Ethiopic Pseudo-Callisthenes or the Zēnā Eskender ("History of Alexander the Great"), is the work of an anonymous Christian and is the most important version of the Alexander Romance in the Geʽez language and the Ethiopian tradition. It was translated in the fourteenth century from an Arabic version of the Romance, which itself was translated from the earlier Syriac Alexander Romance. Although it originates from these sources, it does not follow their three-book structure. The text retains the essential plot from earlier romances, and is a witness to common motifs of Alexander such as his horns.

Alexander the Great was first introduced into Ethiopic translation from the translations of the Bible into Ge'ez in the fifth and sixth centuries, as Alexander is indirectly alluded to in the Book of Daniel. Furthermore, Alexander is explicitly mentioned in a deuterocanonical text known as the Books of the Maccabees (including the Meqabyan). The Ethiopic Alexander tradition would continue to grow after the creation of the Ethiopic Alexander Romance, such as with the continued translation of the Arabic works on Alexander Al-Makīn and Abū Shākir. In total, eight such works, including the Romance, are known. Kotar divides them into two main classes of texts: one where legend surrounds a historical stratum, and one that is purely fabulous. Kotar places the Ethiopic Alexander Romance into the former category.

== Religious influences ==
The text begins with a typical Arabic prayer to God asking for mercy and help in telling the story. Following the designation originating from the Quran, Alexander is often referred to by the title Dhu al-Qarnayn ('The Two-Horned One'). Likewise, from Muslim tradition Alexander's association with Khidr is retained. The text also contains many Christianizing elements however (as opposed to a bare translation of the Arabic text), pointing to a Christian authorship of the text. For example, a Christianized Aristotle serves as his counsellor and he eventually converts to Christianity and proclaims the Trinity: "His Persons being three, and His Godhead one." He later inscribes Christian prophecies onto pillars in the city of Alexandria (who he captures in this text as opposed to founds in earlier versions of the romance).

== Manuscripts ==
The text, along with other significant works of Ethiopian literature, is thought to date to the time of the warrior king Amda Seyon I but is known from one nineteenth-century manuscript discovered from the treasury of Tewodros II. The British came to possess his manuscripts in which they discovered the Ethiopic Alexander Romance. The manuscript has been itemized as British Museum Oriental 826ff. 2a–147a. No variant readings are known.

== Editions ==
The only critical edition of the text, including an English translation, is the work of E.A. Wallis Budge published in 1896. It was published in two volumes: the Ethiopic text in the first volume, and the English translation in the second. It was reprinted in 1968. The work was funded by Lady Meux of Theobalds Park.

== See also ==
- Alexander the Great in Arabic tradition
- Qissat al-Iskandar
