= Song of Alexander =

Medieval Syriac homily

The Song of Alexander (known also as the Syriac Alexander Poem or the Metrical Homily) is a 6th or 7th century legend about Alexander the Great in the Syriac literature tradition. Because the author is not known, but was long mistakenly believed to be Jacob of Serugh (451–521), scholars now simply name the author "Pseudo-Jacob".

The Song is believed to have been written shortly after an earlier Syriac legend about Alexander, called the Syriac Alexander Legend, and the dating of the Song has largely depended in scholarship on when the Legend itself has been dated to. There are two views about the relationship between them: dependence of the Song on the Legend, advocated by Theodor Nöldeke and Gerrit Reinink, and the view that they rely on a common source, advocated by Wilhelm Bousset. Most scholars now accept the dependence view, but the debate has not been settled.

The Legend has been traditionally dated to ~628 AD, leading to a date of the 630s for the Song. Many recent scholars have redated the Legend to the mid-6th century, and now place the Song in the late 6th century text.

In antiquity, the Song was translated into an Arabic version known from two manuscripts.

The standard critical edition of the Syriac text today was published by Reinink in 1983. In 1889, Budge published a Syriac edition and English translation.

== Fountain of life ==
The Song elaborates on a popular legend about Alexander the Great also known from the Alexander Romance, Talmud, and other sources. In this legend, Alexander is travelling along with his company in search of the Fountain of Life that grants the drinker immortality. He encounters a wise old man who tells Alexander that he might identify the water of life by washing salted fish in the diverse springs in his region. One of Alexander's cooks named Andrew is one of the ones instructed with the task of testing out the springs. He begins washing one of the fish in the water. Suddenly, the fish springs to life and escapes into the water, swimming away into a river. The cook is worried that this will anger the king, Alexander, and so he tries to catch it but to no avail. He notifies Alexander of the event but also tells him that, during his episode, he had discovered the fountain of life. Alexander is happy and goes to bathe in the water, but in trying to approach the water enters suddenly into a middle of darkness and is unable to reach it. Alexander is sad, but is consoled by the wise old man; at this point the story shifts into questions asked to the wise man by Alexander and the responses he receives. This story draws on Christian iconography, where bathing in the fountain is represented in baptismal terminology, and the fish symbolizes Jesus who rises from the dead.

== Manuscripts ==
The Song is known from five manuscripts, which have been known to group into three recensions:

- Recension 1:
  - Paris, Bibliothèque nationale de France. Paris syriaque 13. Fols. 177r– 187v. 18th–19th century.
  - Mingana Collection at Selly Oak. Birmingham Mingana syr. 88. Fols. 16r–24v (with a lack of 4 fols. after fol. 19). 15th century.
  - Berlin 169 (Sachau 192). Fols. 65v–99v. From Ṭūr ʿAbdīn, 18th century.
- Recension 2:
  - British Library. Add. 14624. Fols. 20v–34r. 9th century.
- Recension 3:
  - BnF. Paris syriaque 243. Fols. 299v.–318r. A Maronite MS from Rome dated in 1610.

In turn, the Song gave rise to an Arabic version which is also known from two manuscripts.

== Editions ==
- G.J. Reinink, Das syrische Alexanderlied: Die drei Rezensionen (CSCO 454, SSyri 195 (text), CSCO 455, SSyri 196 (German transl.); Louvain: Peeters, 1983.

== See also ==
- Alexander the Great in legend
- Horns of Alexander
- Syriac Alexander Romance
