= Horned King =

Horned King may refer to

- Alexander the Great, compare Horns of Alexander
- Horned King (Chronicles of Prydain), a character in Lloyd Alexander’s Chronicles of Prydain
- Horned King, character in Disney's The Black Cauldron, based on the Chronicles of Prydain
- the Golden Horned King (金角大王) and Silver Horned King (銀角大王), characters from the Chinese novel Journey to the West

== See also ==
- Horned deity
