= Zishan Ghaffar =

Quranic studies scholar

Zishan Ahmad Ghaffar
- Born: 1986 (age 39–40)
- Education: Christian-Albrechts-University of Kiel; University of Münster
- Occupation: Quranic studies scholar
- Employer: University of Paderborn
- Known for: Quranic studies

Zishan Ahmad Ghaffar (born 1986) is a Quranic studies scholar and a professor of Quranic exegesis at the Islamic Theological Seminary of the University of Paderborn.

== Biography ==
Zishan Ghaffar received his master's degree from Christian-Albrechts-University of Kiel in 2011, and earned his Ph.D. in Islamic theology at the University of Münster in 2017. He served as a research associate at the Center for Islamic theology in Münster (2012–2016), and later at the Corpus Coranicum project of the Berlin-Brandenburg Academy of Sciences and Humanities (2017–2020). He was acting professor for Quranic exegesis at the University of Paderborn in 2020 and has held the w3 professorship for Quranic exegesis there since 2020. He also serves as chairman of the Center for Comparative Theology and Cultural Studies.

== Selected works ==
=== As author ===
- Der historische Muhammad in der islamischen Theologie (2018)
- Der Koran in seinem religions- und weltgeschichtlichen Kontext. Eschatologie und Apokalyptik in den mittelmekkanischen Suren (2020)

=== As editor ===
- Theology of Prophecy in Dialogue: A Jewish-Christian-Muslim Encounter (2025)
