= Horns of Alexander =

Tradition in depictions of Alexander the Great

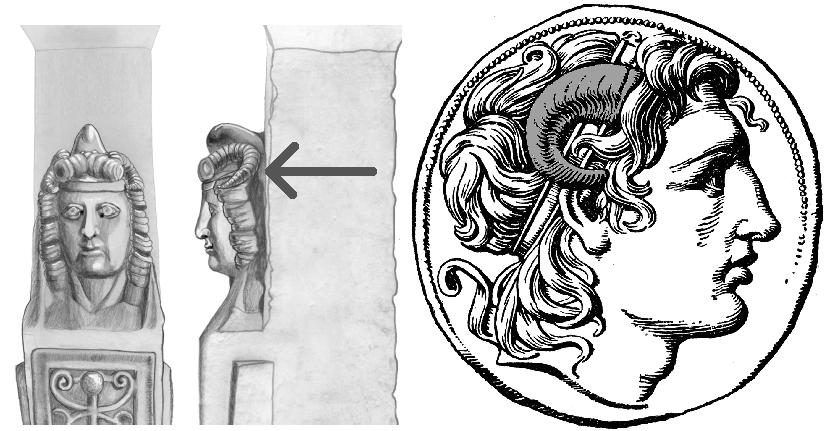
Horned bust of Alexander from Cyprus (left); horned coin portrait of Alexander (right)

The Horns of Alexander represent an artistic tradition that depicted Alexander the Great with two ram horns on his head, a form of expression that evolved out of the Horns of Ammon, associated with the Egypto-Libyan god Ammon that gave divine parentage to Alexander after his pilgrimage to the Siwa Oasis in Egypt in 331 BC. Later, Alexander's horns came to signify the righteous rulership bestowed on him by God.

Alexander's horns came with connotations of political and/or religious legitimacy, including indications of his status as a god, and these representations of Alexander under his successors carried implications of their divine lineage or succession from his reign. Mediums of expression of the horns of Alexander included coinage, sculpture, medallions, textiles, and literary texts, such as in the tradition of the Alexander Romance literature. Rarely was anyone other than Alexander depicted with the two horns as this was considered unique to his imagery.

== Classical antiquity ==
=== Origins of the imagery ===
According to legend, Alexander went on pilgrimage to the Siwa Oasis, the sanctuary of the Greco-Egyptian deity Zeus Ammon in 331 BC. There, he was pronounced by the Oracle to be the son of Zeus Ammon, allowing him to therefore have the Horns of Ammon, which themselves followed from Egyptian iconography of Ammon as a ram-headed god or, in his Greek form, a man with ram horns. The complete imagery may have represented a hybrid depiction that combined the naturalistic face of Zeus' portraiture with Ammon's horns depicting the Egyptian deity in order to signify the emergence of a new political system that encompassed the world, across regions such as Greece, Egypt, Persia, and so forth.

While Alexander likely did not depicted himself with these horns, nor was he depicted this way during his own lifetime, it broadly came to be believed that he did. In the second century AD, the grammarian Athenaeus of Naukratis (Deipnosophistae 12.537e–f) reported that one of Alexander's contemporaries, Ephippus of Olynthus (FGrH 126 F 5), stated that "Alexander used to wear even the sacred vestments at his entertainments; and sometimes he would wear the purple robe, and cloven sandals, and horns of Ammon, as if he had been the god."

=== Coinage ===
Depictions of Alexander with the ram's horns are securely attested for the first time during the reign of his immediate successors who carved out his divided empire among themselves in the aftermath of his death. Among them, coinage of Alexander with the ram horns appear in the domains of Ptolemy I Soter of Egypt (r. 305–282 BC), Lysimachus the king of Thrace (r. 306–281 BC), and Agathocles of Syracuse (r. 317–289 BC). This continued under Arsinoe II (r. 275–268 BC). Two centuries later, in the 1st century BC, the practice reappeared both under Mithridates VI Eupator and on the Roman provincial silver tetradrachms of the quaestor Aesillas in Macedonia (c. 90–70 BC). Numismatic and medallic portraits of Alexander with a ram's horn were revived again in the 3rd century AD, appearing on the pseudo-autonomous bronze coinage of the League of the Macedonians (AD 218–246) and on gold Aboukir medallions from Egypt modeled directly on the earlier tetradrachms of Lysimachus.

While no verified examples exist during Alexander's own lifetime, one disputed exception exists; a unique gold medallion from the Mir Zakah coin hoard in Afghanistan depicting Alexander with both an elephant scalp and the ram's horns of Ammon.

=== Sculptures and other decorations ===
Building sculptures of Alexander with horns became a widespread practice during classical antiquity. In the late second century AD, this practice was commented on, and criticized, by one of the early Christians Clement of Alexandria (in his Exhortation to the Greeks, 4.54.2). For Clement, Alexander's horns represented the pagan practice of self-deification: "Alexander wished to be thought the son of Ammon and to be modeled with horns (κερασφόρος) by sculptors, so eager was he to outrage the beautiful face of a man by a horn."

A life-sized marble head of Alexander with Ammon's ram horns is known from the second half of the second century and is stored at the National Museum of Denmark in Copenhagen.

In April 2024, the discovery of a bronze fitting depicting a two-horned Alexander with wavy hair was announced, discovered in Zealand, an island of Denmark. The artifact is dated to ~200 AD during the reign of the emperor Caracalla, an emperor that believed himself to be the reincarnated Alexander.

== Late antiquity ==
=== Artistic representations ===
Artworks in late antiquity commonly depicted Alexander with horns. Examples of these are found in a gold pendant stored at the Walters Art Museum, Baltimore in addition to a cameo at the British Museum in London that has been dated to between the fourth to seventh centuries. In addition, a sculpture depicting a two-horned Alexander has been discovered at a transept basilica at the site of Katalymata ton Plakoton on Cyprus from the reign of the Byzantine emperor Heraclius during the seventh century.

Artworks in late antiquity continued to depict Alexander with horns reflected in a wider late antique fashion in wearing images of Alexander in the form of personal jewelry and protective amulets/talismans. A few of these physical artifacts have been discovered, like a gold pendant stored now at the Walters Art Museum in Baltimore and a cameo at the British Museum in London, dated to between the fourth and seventh centuries. The late fourth-century Historia Augusta (Tyranni Triginta 14.4–6) reports that members of the Roman Macriani family wore portraits of Alexander engraved in gold and silver on rings, hairnets, bracelets, and other ornaments in the belief that they brought good fortune. John Chrysostom (Catechesis 2.5), around 390 AD, criticized fellow Christians for tying bronze coins of Alexander around their heads and feet. In a Christian setting on seventh-century Cyprus, a stone sculpture depicting a two-horned Alexander has been uncovered at a basilica at the Katalymata ton Plakoton, dated to the reign of the Byzantine emperor Heraclius.

=== Literature ===
==== Alexander Romance ====
In the α recension of the Greek Alexander Romance (attributed to Pseudo-Callisthenes, in the 3rd century AD), Alexander's biological father is the exiled Egyptian pharaoh and magician Nectanebo, who describes the god Ammon as bearing ram's horns above his temples and disguises himself in a ram's fleece and horns to impregnate Alexander's mother, Olympias, then the wife of Philip the Great. After Alexander's death, an oracle instructing Ptolemy (the Pharaoh of Egypt) where to bury him refers to Alexander as "the horned king" (βασιλέα κερασφόρον, 3.34.3).

These literary details are also found in an early 4th-century Latin translation of the Romance by Julius Valerius (in his Res Gestae Alexandri Macedonis 1.4–8), including Nectanebo's disguise with the ram's horns of Ammon (arietis cornibus). The "horned king" epithet appears again in the 5th-century Armenian Alexander Romance, which also has the episode of the construction of the gates against Gog and Magog, and later again in the 7th-century Syriac Alexander Romance.

==== Syriac Alexander Legend ====
At some point in late antiquity, Alexander the Great came to be depicted as a pious Christian. The most prominent witness to this transformation is the Syriac Alexander Legend, previously seen as a work of pro-Heraclian propaganda dating to c. 629–630 AD but in more recent work having been puhed back in its original composition to the mid-sixth century AD from the late reign of Justinian I. In this work, the "horns of Alexander" (ܩܪ̈ܢܬܐ, qarnātā) are referenced two times. The first appears in a prayer offered by Alexander near the beginning of the text:

King Alexander bowed, and worshipping said: “Oh God, master of kings and judges, you who raise up kings and dismiss their power, I perceive with my mind that you made me great among all kings, and that you caused horns to grow on my head, so that I may gore with them the kingdoms of the world. Give me the power from the heavens of your sanctity so that I may receive strength greater than the kingdoms of the world, and I will humiliate them and glorify your name forever, oh Lord!”

The second reference occurs later, when God speaks to Alexander and promises him "horns of iron" (ܩܪ̈ܢܬܐ ܕܦܪܙܠܐ, qarnātā d-parzlā) as weapons against earthly kingdoms:

I made you great among all kings, and I caused horns of iron to grow on your head, so that you may gore with them the kingdoms of the world.

To achieve this horned imagery, the Syriac Alexander Legend reworks and synthesizes Hellenistic iconography with biblical imagery, drawing on the Syriac translation of the Bible (the Peshitta, especially of 1 Kings 22:11 / 2 Chronicles 18:10, Micah 4:13, and Daniel 8). While earlier Christian exegesis of the Book of Daniel interpreted its horned ram to be the empire of Media-Persia and Alexander instead was identified with the one-horned he-goat in Daniel. The Legend therefore had synthesized Danielic apocalypticism with the existing two-horned imagery of Alexander.

==== Quran ====
In the Quran (Surah Al-Kahf/18), a figure called Dhu al-Qarnayn, "The Two Horned One", has been identified as Alexander the Great both in the medieval Arabic tradition and by contemporary historians. A secondary tradition has identified Dhu al-Qarnayn as Sa'b Dhu Marathid, a fictional Himyarite king whose biography was derived from Alexander's.

== Medieval Islam ==
In the medieval Islamic period and in light of the widely held understanding that the Quran was depicting Alexander as being two-horned, Alexander would widely be referred to as the "Two-Horned One" and his name often merged with that phrase. In Arabic-language Alexander traditions, Alexander was variously called "Dhu l-Qarnayn", "al-Iskandar Dhūl-qarnayn", or sometimes just "Dhūlqarnayn". One example is the ninth-century Hispano-Arabic legend known as the Qissat Dhulqarnayn, meaning "Story of the Two-Horned One", whom it identifies as Alexander. Another Qissat Dhulqarnayn was produced in the eleventh century within the Ara'is al-majalis fi Qisas al-anbiya' (Book of Prophets) of al-Tha'labi (d. 1036). The Hadīth Dhī ʾl-Qarnayn, also known as the Leyenda de Alejandro, is a 15th-century Hispano-Arabic legend which also identifies Dhu al-Qarnayn with Alexander and refers to him by that name.

== Ethiopia ==
Alexander's horns are also found in the Ethiopic Alexander Romance (Zēnā Eskender), a Christianized adaptation via an Arabic intermediary into the Ge'ez (Ethiopic) language, rooted in the earlier Syriac Alexander Romance.

The Ethiopic version of Alexander's horned imagery synthesizes elements found both in the original Greek Alexander Romance and Arabic developments. For example, Nectanebo is still described as disguising himself in the fleece of a ram and its horns to impersonate the god Ammon in his pursuit of Phillip's wife, but it also calls Alexander by the epithet Dhū al-Qarnayn ("Two-Horned One"). Later Ethiopic tradition further reinterpreted this title; these works glossed the title as a cosmographic representation instead solely as depicting physical horns. Alexander was called "Two-Horned" because he ruled over "the two horns of the sun, the east and the west."

== See also ==
- Gates of Alexander
- Hadith Dhulqarnayn
- Horns of Moses
