= Armenian Alexander Romance =

Armenian version of the Alexander Romance

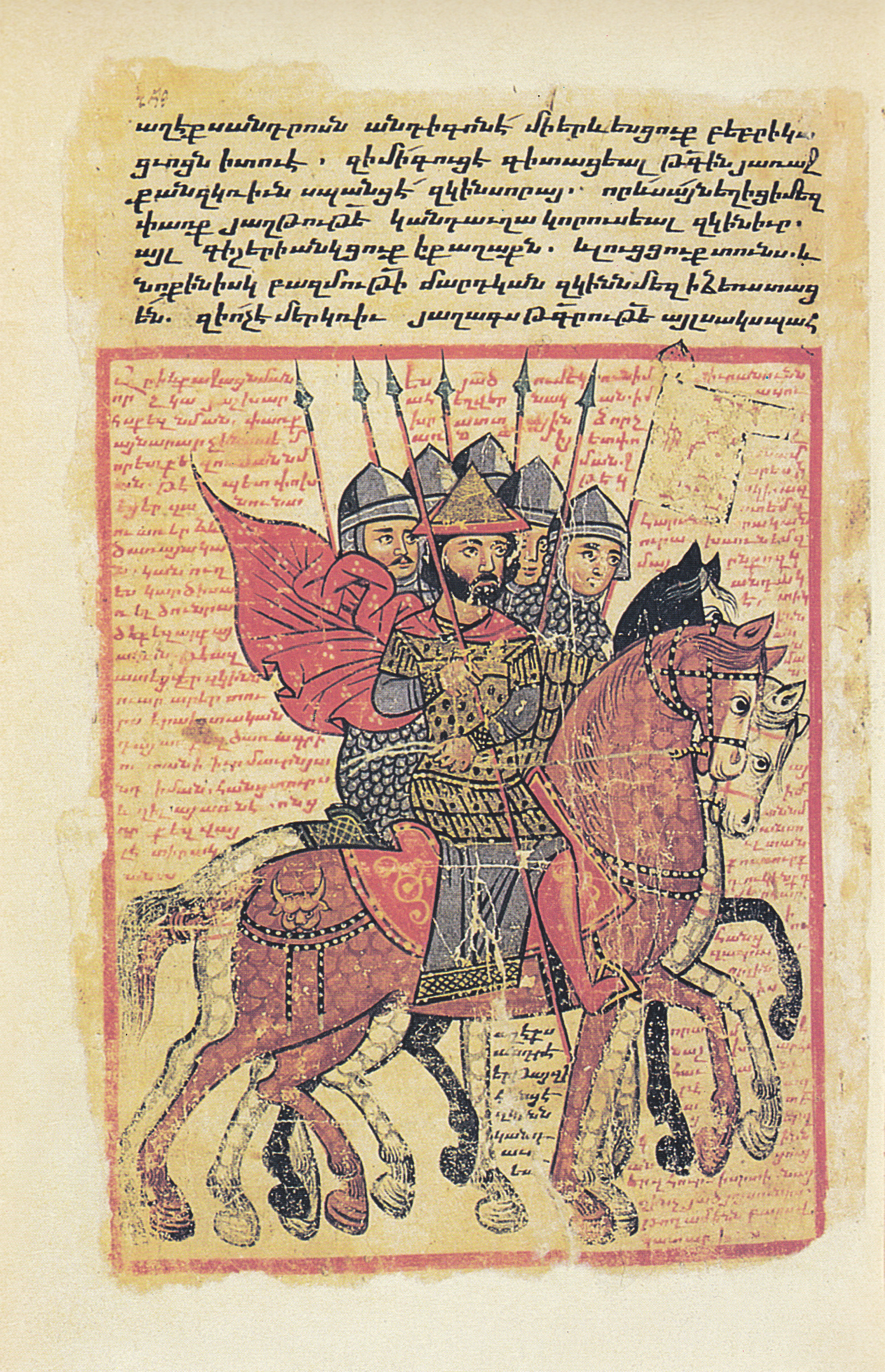
Armenian illuminated manuscript of the 14th century

The Armenian Alexander Romance, known in Armenian as The History of Alexander of Macedon, is an Armenian recension (or version) of the Greek Alexander Romance (in its α recension) from the fifth-century. It incorporates many of its own elements, materials, and narratives not found in the original Greek version. While the text did not substantively influence Eastern legend, it is considered highly important for reconstructing the text of the original Greek romance. The text continued to be copied until the eighteenth century, and the first Armenian and scholar to write a detailed study of the text was Father Raphael Tʿreanc. He published an Armenian edition of it in 1842.

In original Greek romance, Alexander is posthumously described as "the horned king" (βασιλέα κερασφόρον) by an oracle instructing one of his generals, Ptolemy, on where to bury him. The Armenian version repeats this statement, making it a witness of the motif of the horns of Alexander, alongside the Syriac Alexander Legend and other versions of Alexander legends. Unlike the horns motif, no tradition of building a wall against Gog and Magog is found in the text.

The Armenian Romance greatly influenced the History of the Armenians of Movses Khorenatsi, with which it shares up to thirty direct parallels.

== Manuscripts ==
There are at least 80 manuscripts of the Armenian Alexander Romance, of which 14 are illuminated — heavily so, with an average of 125 scenes each — although no survey has yet been able to account for the number of copies of the romance worldwide. The earliest are two from the 13th or 14th centuries (M10151 and V424), with the rest being from the 16th century onwards. In 2015, Kouymijian published a study of the iconography found in the Armenian manuscripts.

== Dating ==
The translator is thought by some to have been the Armenian historian Movses of Khoren. Some scholars more argue that a date more precisely in the 480s is most probable. A dating of the fifth century is usually posited for two reasons: one is the association with Movses in some attributions, who lived in the fifth century. Some scholars most recently have tended to date the life of Movses to the 8th and 9th centuries, but a good reason to continue to date it to the fifth century is its style of translation, which is characteristic of Armenian translations that were being produced soon after the development of the Armenian alphabet around 400 by Mesrop Mashtots.

== Other Armenian Alexander legends ==
A second Armenian version of the Alexander Romance is also known. The first one went through various closely related versions up until the thirteenth century. However, a second version was produced sometime during the fourteenth to sixteenth centuries. It became popular in an edition produced of it by Khachatur Kesaratsi between 1280 and 1310. The earliest manuscript is from the 12th century, called San Lazzaro MS 424 - Alexander romance (see ), and a published edition of it came out in 2001.

With the passage of time, Armenian manuscripts of the Alexander Romance begin to be accompanied and interpolated by original and once independent short monorhymed poems (called kafas) about Alexander legends. This began in the 13th century with the Armenian poet Xačʽatur Kečʽaṙecʽi, who added more than 150 short poems to the manuscript he produced, and it went on until the 16th century, primarily with Katʽołikos Grigoris Ałtʽamarcʽi and his pupil Zakʽaria Gnunecʽi. These poems depict how the Armenian romance was understood, and on occasion offer direct interpretations. The poems began to find their way into manuscripts of other texts as well. For example, a 17th-century manuscript M7709 of the Armenian History of the City of Brass is accompanied by a few Alexander poems by an unknown scribe.

== Editions and translations ==
- In 1969, a translation of the Armenian recension into English was published by Albert Mugrdich Wolohojian.
- A critical edition of the Armenian text is available in: H. Simonyan, Patmowt’iwn Alek’sandri Makedonac ’woy, haykakan xmbagrowt'iwnner [Storia di Alessandro il Macedone, redazioni armene], Erevan 1989.

== See also ==
- Alexander the Great in legend
- Qissat al-Iskandar
