= Horns of Ammon =

Curling ram horns in Egyptian mythology

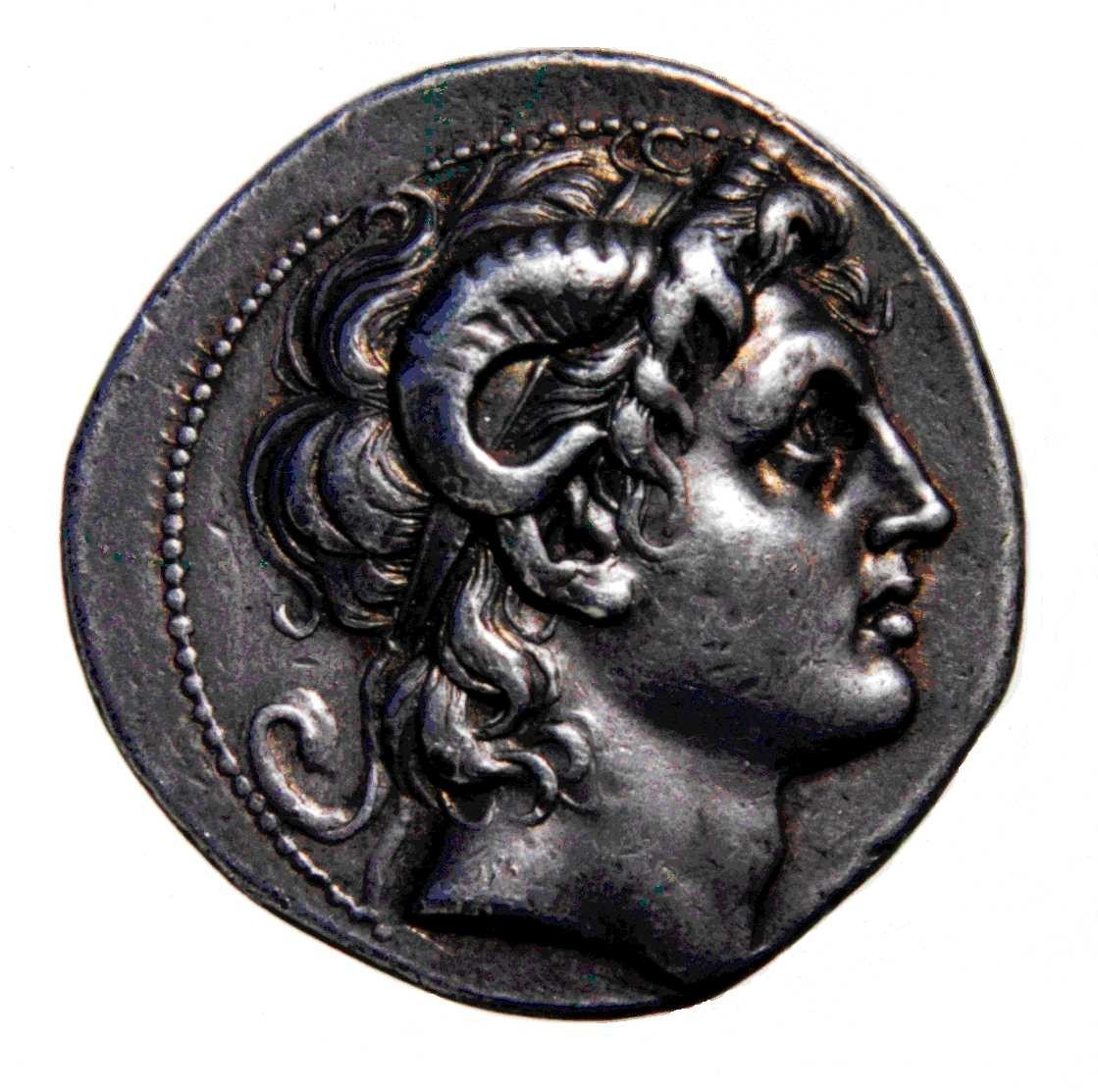
A coin depicting Alexander the Great, conqueror of Egypt, with Horns of Ammon on his head

The horns of Ammon were curling ram horns, used as a symbol of the Egyptian deity Ammon (also spelled Amun or Amon). Because of the visual similarity, they were also associated with the fossil shells of ancient snails and cephalopods, the latter now known as ammonite because of that historical connection. This symbolism later inspired the horns of Alexander due to the legend of Alexander the Great's descent from Zeus-Ammon.

== Classical iconography ==
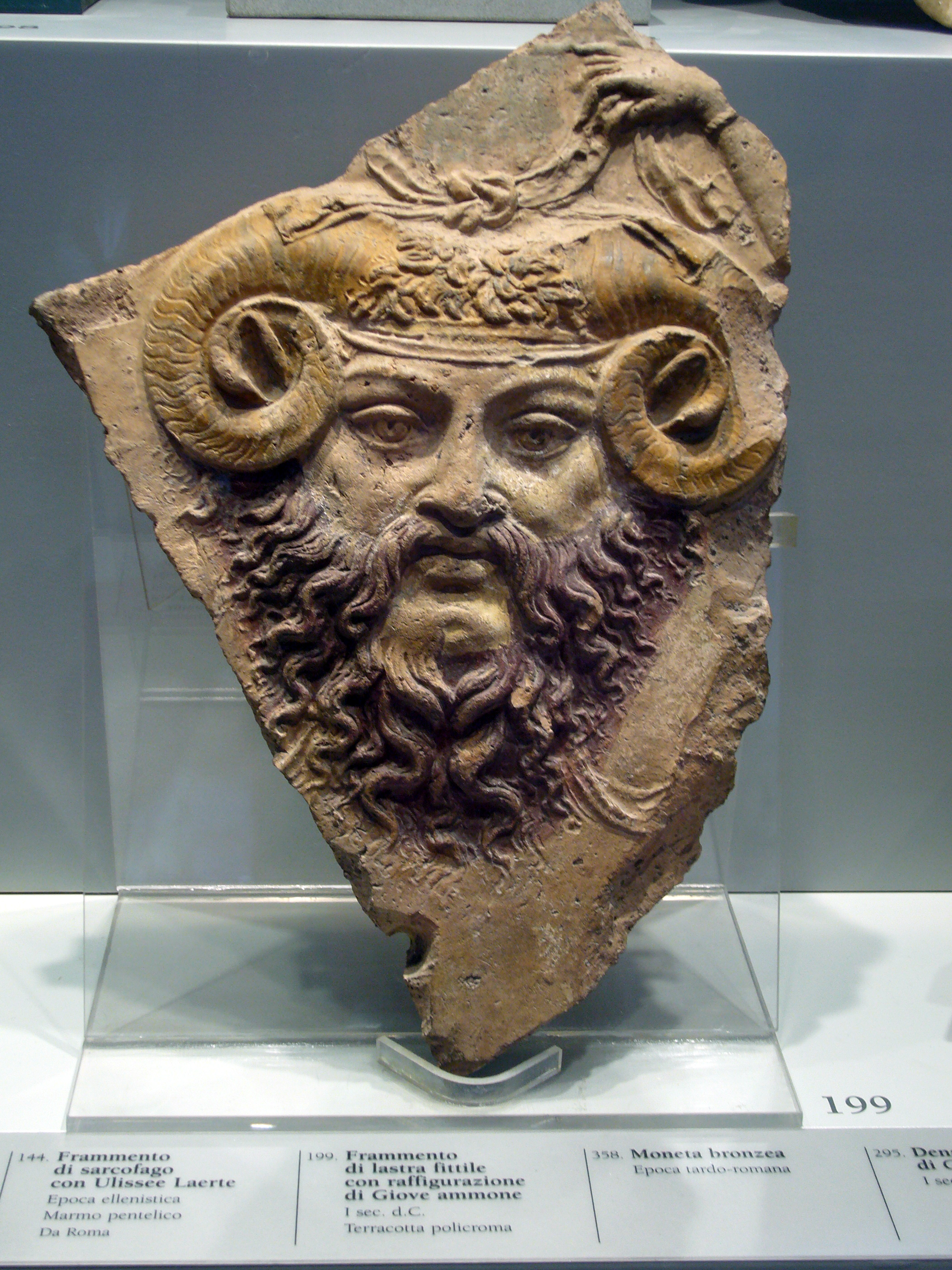
Jupiter Ammon, depicted in a terracotta fragment.

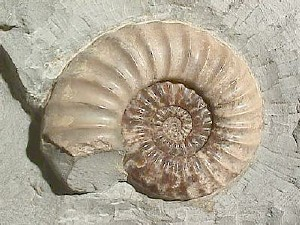
A fossil ammonite, showing its horn-like spiral

Ammon, eventually Amon-Ra, was a deity in the Egyptian pantheon whose popularity grew over the years, until growing into a monotheistic religion in a way similar to the proposal that the Judeo-Christian-Islamic deity evolved out of the Ancient Semitic pantheon. Egyptian pharaohs came to follow this religion for a while, Amenhotep and Tutankhamun taking their names from their deity. This trend caught on, with other Egyptian gods also sometimes being described as aspects of Amun.

Ammon was often depicted with ram's horns, so that as this deity became a symbol of supremacy, kings and emperors came to be depicted with Horns of Ammon on the sides of their head in profile, as well as the deities not only of Egypt, but other areas, so that Jupiter was sometimes depicted as "Jupiter Ammon", replete with Horns of Ammon, after Rome conquered Egypt, as was the Greek supreme deity Zeus. Alexander the Great's deification as a conqueror had involved being declared the metaphorical "Son of Ammon" by the Oracle at Siwa. This tradition is thought by some to have continued for centuries, with Alexander the Great being allegedly referred to in the Quran as “Dhu al-Qarnayn” (The Two-Horned One), a supposed reference to his depiction on Middle Eastern coins and statuary as having horns, consistent with the view of most scholars on Islamic exegesis that Dhu al-Qarnayn was Alexander the Great.

Pliny the Elder was among the earliest writers known to have associated spiral shells with the deity Ammon, referring to them as ammonis cornua (horns of Ammon) in his book Naturalis Historia. Considering the relative rarity of ammonite fossils in Egypt, this may have originated with fossil snail shells like Natica hybrida found in Mokattam limestone near Cairo.

The direct attribution of the Horns of Ammon with fossil cephalopod shells became common during Medieval times with mentions by writers like Georgius Agricola and Conrad Gesner. These led to a widespread association that climaxed with paleontologist Karl Alfred von Zittel naming the class of animals Ammonoidea in 1848.
