= Katalymata ton Plakoton =

Archeological site in Cyprus

Coordinates: 34°35′00″N 032°56′45″E

Katalymata ton Plakoton (Greek: Καταλύματα των Πλακωτών) is an archeological site in the vicinity of Akrotiri, on the island of Cyprus.

The first archaeological surveys began in 2007–2010 by the Department of Antiquities of Cyprus. The archaeological site contained a complex of two religious temples, wholly approximately 100 meters in length. The first temple consists of a three-aisled basilica with a transverse aisle, and is 36 meters wide and 29 meters long.

In December 2018, a Byzantine church with mosaics including inscriptions in perfect condition dating back to the reign of Emperor Heraclius was discovered during the twelfth excavation season under the supervision of Dr Eleni Procopiouat the site of Katalymata ton Plakoton, according to an Athens Macedonia News Agency. The Greek Christian mosaic panels included a text—"My Lord help those who honour thy name".
