= Dhu'l-Qarnayn =

Figure in the Quran

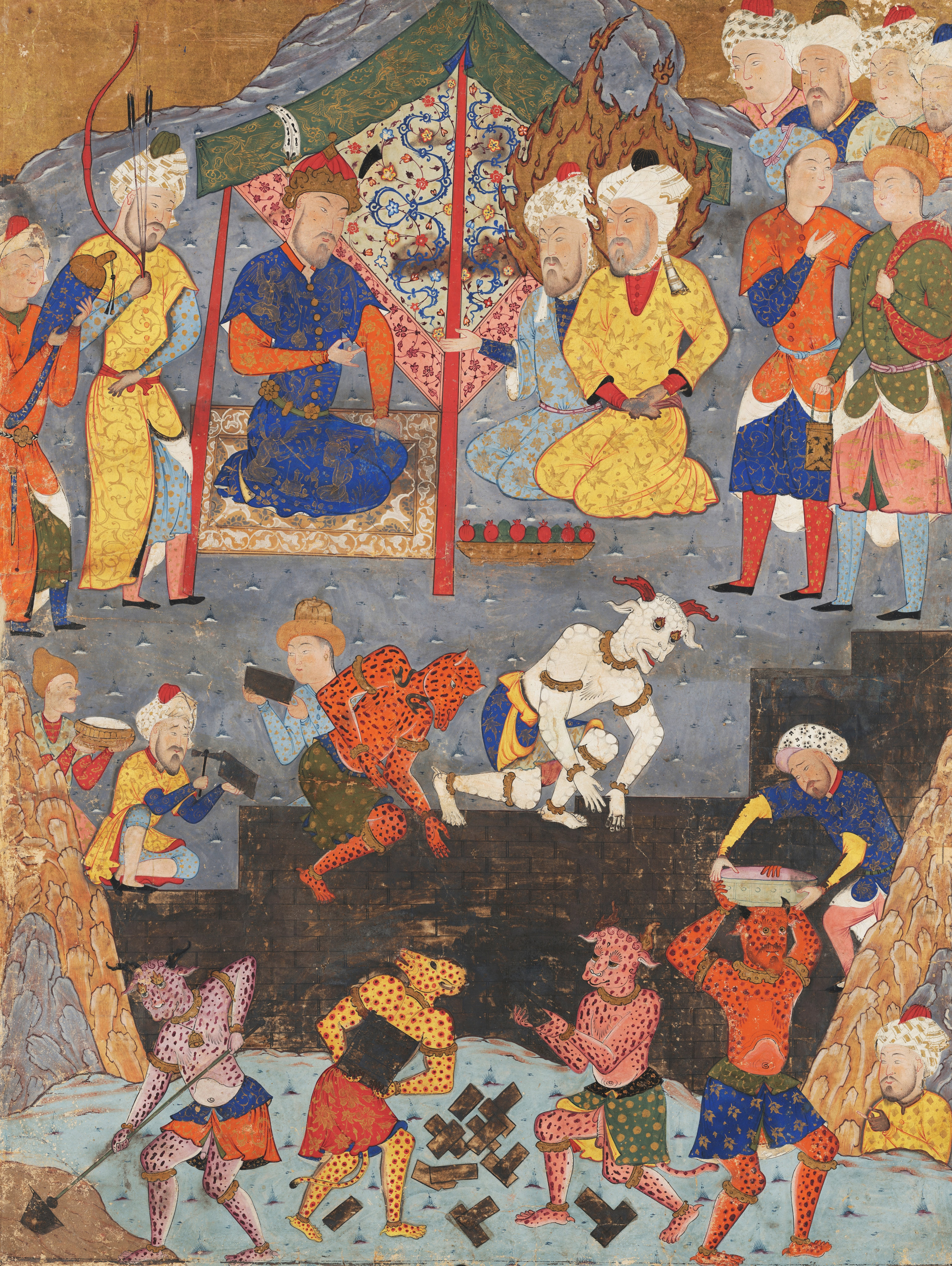
Dhu al-Qarnayn building a wall with the help of the jinns to keep away Gog and Magog. Persian miniature from a book of Falnama copied for the Safavid emperor Tahmasp I (r. 1524–1576), currently preserved in the Chester Beatty Library, Dublin.

Dhu'l-Qarnayn (Arabic: ذُو ٱلْقَرْنَيْن, romanized: Dhū l-Qarnayn IPA: [ðu‿l.qarˈnajn]; lit. "The Owner of Two-Horns") is a leader who appears in the Quran, Surah al-Kahf (18), Ayahs 83–101, as one who travels to the east and west and sets up a barrier between a certain people and Gog and Magog (يَأْجُوجُ وَمَأْجُوجُ, Yaʾjūj wa-Maʾjūj). Elsewhere, the Quran tells how the End Times will be signaled by the release of Gog and Magog from behind the barrier. Other apocalyptic writings predict that their destruction by God in a single night will usher in the Day of Resurrection (یوم القيامة, Yawm al-Qiyāmah).

Most Western historians and traditional Muslim scholars have identified Dhu'l-Qarnayn as Alexander the Great, while its Quranic portrayal as a prophet-king has been associated with the Syriac Alexander Legend. More recently, the theory of Cyrus the Great as Dhu'l-Qarnayn has gained popularity among modern Muslim commentators. Historically, some traditions has parted from these identifications in favor of others, like Sa'b Dhu Marathid of Himyar or al-Mundhir III ibn al-Nu'man of the Lakhmid kingdom.

== Quran 18:83–101 ==
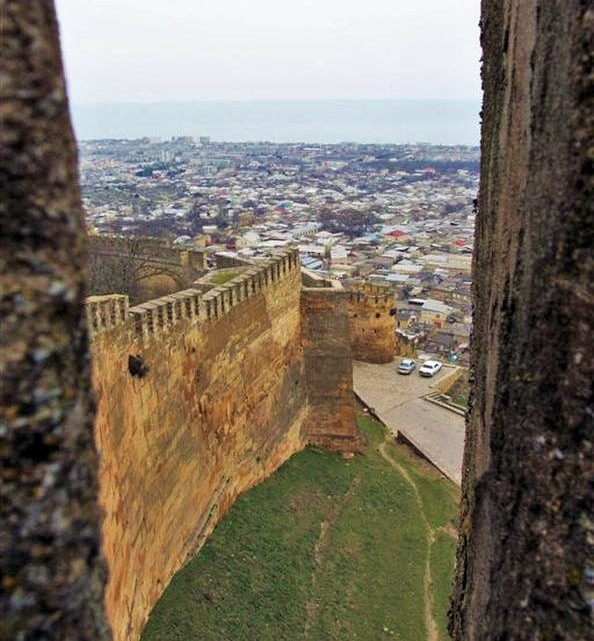
The Caspian Gates in Derbent, Russia, part of the defence systems built by the Sasanian Empire, often identified with the Gates of Alexander.

Recitation of al-Kahf, verses 83-101, taken from a full recitation of Al-Kahf.

The verses of the chapter reproduced below show Dhu al-Qarnayn traveling first to the Western limit of travel where he sees the sun set in a muddy spring, then to the furthest East where he sees it rise from the ocean, and finally northward to a place in the mountains where he finds a people oppressed by Gog and Magog:

Verse Number	Arabic (Uthmani script)	English (Marmaduke Pickthall)
18:83	وَيَسْـَٔلُونَكَ عَن ذِى ٱلْقَرْنَيْنِ ۖ قُلْ سَأَتْلُوا۟ عَلَيْكُم مِّنْهُ ذِكْرًا	"They will ask you about Dhu'l-Qarneyn. Say: I shall recite unto you a remembrance of him."^{[Quran 18:83]}
18:84	إِنَّا مَكَّنَّا لَهُۥ فِى ٱلْأَرْضِ وَءَاتَيْنَٰهُ مِن كُلِّ شَىْءٍ سَبَبًا	"We established him in the land, and gave him the means to all things."^{[Quran 18:84]}
18:85	فَأَتْبَعَ سَبَبًا	"And he followed a road."^{[Quran 18:85]}
18:86	حَتَّىٰٓ إِذَا بَلَغَ مَغْرِبَ ٱلشَّمْسِ وَجَدَهَا تَغْرُبُ فِى عَيْنٍ حَمِئَةٍ وَوَجَدَ عِندَهَا قَوْمًا ۗ قُلْنَا يَٰذَا ٱلْقَرْنَيْنِ إِمَّآ أَن تُعَذِّبَ وَإِمَّآ أَن تَتَّخِذَ فِيهِمْ حُسْنًا	"Till, when he reached the setting-place of the sun, he found it setting in a muddy spring, and found a people thereabout. We said: O Dhu'l-Qarneyn! Either punish or show them kindness."^{[Quran 18:86]}
18:87	قَالَ أَمَّا مَن ظَلَمَ فَسَوْفَ نُعَذِّبُهُۥ ثُمَّ يُرَدُّ إِلَىٰ رَبِّهِۦ فَيُعَذِّبُهُۥ عَذَابًا نُّكْرًا	"He said: As for him who doeth wrong, we shall punish him, and then he will be brought back unto his Lord, Who will punish him with awful punishment!"^{[Quran 18:87]}
18:88	وَأَمَّا مَنْ ءَامَنَ وَعَمِلَ صَٰلِحًا فَلَهُۥ جَزَآءً ٱلْحُسْنَىٰ ۖ وَسَنَقُولُ لَهُۥ مِنْ أَمْرِنَا يُسْرًا	"But as for him who believeth and doeth right, good will be his reward, and We shall speak unto him a mild command."^{[Quran 18:88]}
18:89	ثُمَّ أَتْبَعَ سَبَبًا	"Then he followed a road."^{[Quran 18:89]}
18:90	حَتَّىٰٓ إِذَا بَلَغَ مَطْلِعَ ٱلشَّمْسِ وَجَدَهَا تَطْلُعُ عَلَىٰ قَوْمٍ لَّمْ نَجْعَل لَّهُم مِّن دُونِهَا سِتْرًا	"Till, when he reached the rising-place of the sun, he found it rising on a people for whom We had appointed no shelter therefrom."^{[Quran 18:90]}
18:91	كَذَٰلِكَ وَقَدْ أَحَطْنَا بِمَا لَدَيْهِ خُبْرًا	"So (it was). And We knew all concerning him."^{[Quran 18:91]}
18:92	ثُمَّ أَتْبَعَ سَبَبًا	"Then he followed a road."^{[Quran 18:92]}
18:93	حَتَّىٰٓ إِذَا بَلَغَ بَيْنَ ٱلسَّدَّيْنِ وَجَدَ مِن دُونِهِمَا قَوْمًا لَّا يَكَادُونَ يَفْقَهُونَ قَوْلًا	"Till, when he came between the two mountains, he found upon their hither side a folk that scarce could understand a saying."^{[Quran 18:93]}
18:94	قَالُوا۟ يَٰذَا ٱلْقَرْنَيْنِ إِنَّ يَأْجُوجَ وَمَأْجُوجَ مُفْسِدُونَ فِى ٱلْأَرْضِ فَهَلْ نَجْعَلُ لَكَ خَرْجًا عَلَىٰٓ أَن تَجْعَلَ بَيْنَنَا وَبَيْنَهُمْ سَدًّا	"They said: O Dhu'l-Qarneyn! Gog and Magog are spoiling the land. So may we pay thee tribute on condition that thou set a barrier between us and them?"^{[Quran 18:94]}
18:95	قَالَ مَا مَكَّنِّى فِيهِ رَبِّى خَيْرٌ فَأَعِينُونِى بِقُوَّةٍ أَجْعَلْ بَيْنَكُمْ وَبَيْنَهُمْ رَدْمًا	"He said: That wherein my Lord hath established me is better (than your tribute). Do but help me with strength (of men), I will set between you and them a bank."^{[Quran 18:95]}
18:96	ءَاتُونِى زُبَرَ ٱلْحَدِيدِ ۖ حَتَّىٰٓ إِذَا سَاوَىٰ بَيْنَ ٱلصَّدَفَيْنِ قَالَ ٱنفُخُوا۟ ۖ حَتَّىٰٓ إِذَا جَعَلَهُۥ نَارًا قَالَ ءَاتُونِىٓ أُفْرِغْ عَلَيْهِ قِطْرًا	"Give me pieces of iron - till, when he had levelled up (the gap) between the cliffs, he said: Blow! - till, when he had made it a fire, he said: Bring me molten copper to pour thereon."^{[Quran 18:96]}
18:97	فَمَا ٱسْطَٰعُوٓا۟ أَن يَظْهَرُوهُ وَمَا ٱسْتَطَٰعُوا۟ لَهُۥ نَقْبًا	"And (Gog and Magog) were not able to surmount, nor could they pierce (it)."^{[Quran 18:97]}
18:98	قَالَ هَٰذَا رَحْمَةٌ مِّن رَّبِّى ۖ فَإِذَا جَآءَ وَعْدُ رَبِّى جَعَلَهُۥ دَكَّآءَ ۖ وَكَانَ وَعْدُ رَبِّى حَقًّا	"He said: This is a mercy from my Lord; but when the promise of my Lord cometh to pass, He will lay it low, for the promise of my Lord is true."^{[Quran 18:98]}
18:99	وَتَرَكْنَا بَعْضَهُمْ يَوْمَئِذٍ يَمُوجُ فِى بَعْضٍ ۖ وَنُفِخَ فِى ٱلصُّورِ فَجَمَعْنَٰهُمْ جَمْعًا	"And on that day we shall let some of them surge against others, and the Trumpet will be blown. Then We shall gather them together in one gathering."^{[Quran 18:99]}
18:100	وَعَرَضْنَا جَهَنَّمَ يَوْمَئِذٍ لِّلْكَٰفِرِينَ عَرْضًا	"On that day we shall present hell to the disbelievers, plain to view,"^{[Quran 18:100]}
18:101	ٱلَّذِينَ كَانَتْ أَعْيُنُهُمْ فِى غِطَآءٍ عَن ذِكْرِى وَكَانُوا۟ لَا يَسْتَطِيعُونَ سَمْعًا	"Those whose eyes were hoodwinked from My reminder, and who could not bear to hear."^{[Quran 18:101]}

== Quranic exegesis ==
=== Occasion of revelation ===
The story of Dhu al-Qarnayn is related in chapter 18 of the Qur'an, al-Kahf, revealed to Muhammad when his tribe, Al-Quraysh, sent two men to discover whether the Jews, with their superior knowledge of the scriptures, could advise them on whether Muhammad was truly a prophet of God. The rabbis told the Quraysh to ask Muhammad about three things, one of them "about a man who travelled and reached the east and the west of the earth, ask what his story was. If he tells you about these things, then he is a prophet, so follow him, but if he does not tell you, then he is a man who is making things up, so deal with him as you see fit." (Qur'an 18:83-98).

=== Qarnayn ===
A well known narration from a Companion of Muhammad, Ali denies that the term "Qarnayn" literally meant horns. He instead narrates that the term "Dhul Qarnayn" was not a literal term but instead referred to injuries that took place on the two sides of the head of the ruler.

Cyril Glasse writes that the reference to "He of the two horns" also has a symbolical interpretation: “He of the two Ages”, which reflects the eschatological shadow that Alexander casts from his time, which preceded Islam by many centuries, until the end of the world. The Arabian word qarn means both "horn" and “period” or “century”. Classical commentary from Al-Qurtubi has reported the narration from Al-Suhayli commentaries that he favored the identification that Dhu al-Qarnayn were actually two different persons, where one lived during the time of Abraham, while the other has lived during the time of Jesus.

=== Gog and Magog ===
Regarding the Gog and Magog, a minority of Muslim commentators argue that Gog and Magog here refers to some barbaric North Asian tribes from pre-Biblical times which have been free from Dhu al-Qarnayn's wall for a long time. Modern Islamic apocalyptic writers put forward various explanations for the absence of the wall from the modern world, such as "not everything in existence can be seen", similar to human intelligence and angels, or that God has concealed the Gog and Magog from human eyes.

== People identified as Dhu al-Qarnayn ==
=== Alexander the Great ===
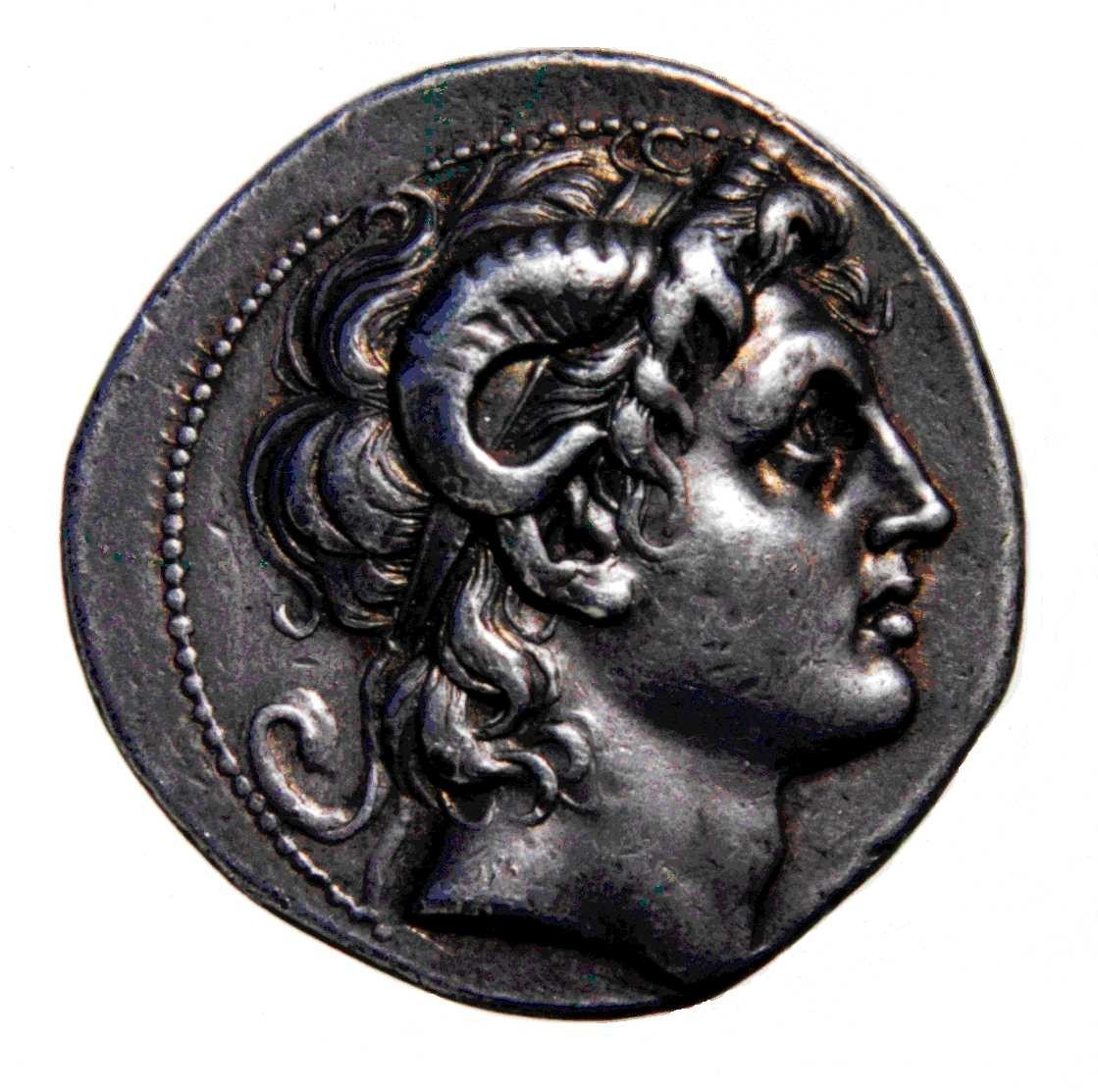
Silver tetradrachm of Alexander the Great shown wearing the horns of the ram-god Zeus-Ammon.

According to most historians, the story of Dhu al-Qarnayn has its origins in legends of Alexander the Great current in the Middle East, namely the Syriac Alexander Legend. From this derives the Quranic presentation of Dhu al-Qarnayn as a prophet-king who travels the world and calls for belief.The first century Josephus repeats a legend whereby Alexander builds an iron wall at a mountain pass (potentially at the Caucasus Mountains) to prevent an incursion by a barbarian group known as the Scythians, whom elsewhere he identified as Magog. The legend went through much further elaboration in subsequent centuries before eventually finding its way into the Quran through a Syrian version. However, some have questioned whether the Syriac Legend influenced the Quran on the basis of dating inconsistencies and missing key motifs, although others have in turn rebutted these arguments.

While the Syriac Alexander Legend references the horns of Alexander, it consistently refers to the hero by his Greek name, not using a variant epithet. The use of the Islamic epithet Dhu al-Qarnayn "Two-Horned", first occurred in the Quran. The reasons behind the name "Two-Horned" are somewhat obscure: the scholar al-Tabari (839-923 CE) held it was because he went from one extremity ("horn") of the world to the other, but it may ultimately derive from imagery of the horns of Alexander, inspired by the tradition of his descent from the ram-god Zeus-Ammon, as popularised on coins throughout the Hellenistic Near East.

The wall Dhu al-Qarnayn builds on his northern journey may have reflected a distant knowledge of the Great Wall of China (the 12th-century scholar Muhammad al-Idrisi drew a map for Roger II of Sicily showing the "Land of Gog and Magog" in Mongolia), or of various Sasanian walls built in the Caspian Sea region against the northern barbarians, or a conflation of the two.

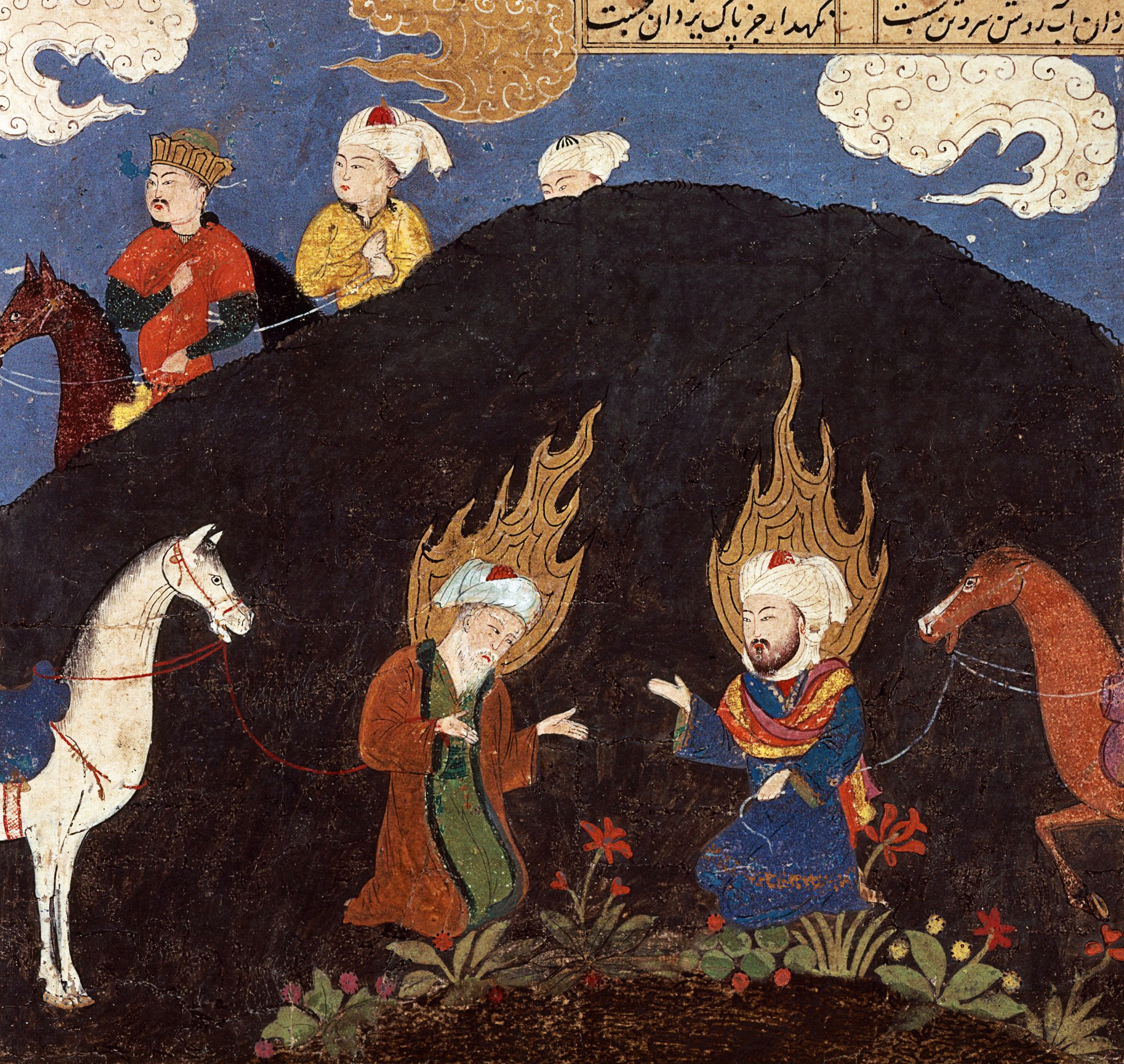
Persian miniature of Alexander (top left) visiting the fountain of Youth and meeting Khidr and Ilyas there

Dhu al-Qarnayn also journeys to the western and eastern extremities ("qarns", tips) of the Earth. Ernst claims that Dhu al-Qarnayn finding the sun setting in a "muddy spring" in the West is equivalent to the "poisonous sea" found by Alexander in the Syriac legend. In the Syriac story Alexander tested the sea by sending condemned prisoners into it, while the Quran refers to this as an administration of justice. In the East both the Syrian legend and the Quran, according to Ernst, have Alexander/Dhu al-Qarnayn find a people who live so close to the rising sun that they have no protection from its heat.

Some exegetes believed that Dhu al-Qarnayn lived near the time of Abraham following accounts by al-Azraqi and Ibn Abi Hatim. To avoid this chronological discrepancy, several medieval exegetes and historians did not identify Dhu al-Qarnayn with Alexander. Al-Tabari inferred that there were two Dhu al-Qarnayn's: the earlier one, called Dhu al-Qarnayn al-Akbar, who lived in the time of Abraham, and the later one, who was Alexander. In one account concerning Abraham building a well at Beersheba, Dhu al-Qarnayn seems to have been placed in the role of Abimelech as described in Gen 21:22–34.

Other notable Muslim commentators, including ibn Kathir,^{:100-101} ibn Taymiyyah,^{:101} Naser Makarem Shirazi, and Ebrahim Desai, have used theological arguments to reject the Alexander identification: Alexander lived only a short time whereas Dhu al-Qarnayn (according to some traditions) lived for 700 years as a sign of God's blessing, though this is not mentioned in the Quran, and Dhu al-Qarnayn worshipped only one God, while Alexander was a polytheist.

=== Ṣaʿb Dhu-Marāthid ===
The various campaigns of Dhu al-Qarnayn mentioned in Q:18:83-101 have also been attributed to the South Arabian Himyarite King Ṣaʿb Dhu-Marāthid (also known as al-Rāʾid). Ibn Hisham gives an extensive forty-five page account of King Ṣaʿb in his work The Book of Crowns on the Kings of Himyar, relying on the Yemeni author Wahb ibn Munabbih (b. 655 CE). In this account, King Ṣaʿb was a conqueror who was given the epithet Dhu al-Qarnayn after meeting a figure named Musa al Khidr in Jerusalem. He then travels to the ends of the earth, conquering or converting people until being led by al Khidr through the Land of Darkness. Other elements include a journey to a valley of diamonds, a castle with glass walls, and a campaign as far as the Andalusia region (classical era Spain). However, according to Al-Qurtubi, the original opinion of Wahb ibn Munabbih identified the legendary conqueror as a Roman, contradicting Ibn Hisham's commentary. Al-Tabari also reports that Wahb believed Dhu al-Qarnayn was a man from Byzantium named Iskandar (Alexander).

Academic scholars consider the Sa'b story to be an appropriation of the Syriac Alexander Legend. While Ibn Hisham's book made use of Wahb's material, Tilman Nagel doubts that Wahb's text included this particular story given Ibn Hisham's sceptical attitude to the claims of Southern Arabians, and notes that al-Tabari relied on Wahb's Alexander story yet included no Himyarite (South Arabian) elements. Following a detailed analysis, Nagel instead defines the milieu in which this version emerged as that of South Arabians in early eighth-century Egypt, and observes that Southern Arabs were one of two factions who vied for power in the Umayyad empire.

Richard Stoneman notes that Wahb was known for the composition of qisas, in which folklore is served up as history. According to Stoneman, the South Arabian legend was composed within the context of the division between the South Arabs and North Arabs that began with the Battle of Marj Rahit in 684 AD and consolidated over two centuries. He too dates the story to the 8th century CE, intended to give a parallel for, and to justify, the Islamic conquests in the west, representing a glorification of the South Arabian traditions and their conquests in Egypt. Anna Akasoy agrees with Alfred Beeston that Sa'b's entire existence is fictional and a product of Yemeni chauvinism, noting that later Yemeni Kings whose existence is confirmed were assigned similar exploits borrowed from legends of Alexander. According to Wheeler, it is possible that some elements of these accounts that were originally associated with Ṣaʿb have been incorporated into stories which identify Dhu al-Qarnayn with Alexander.

=== Cyrus the Great ===
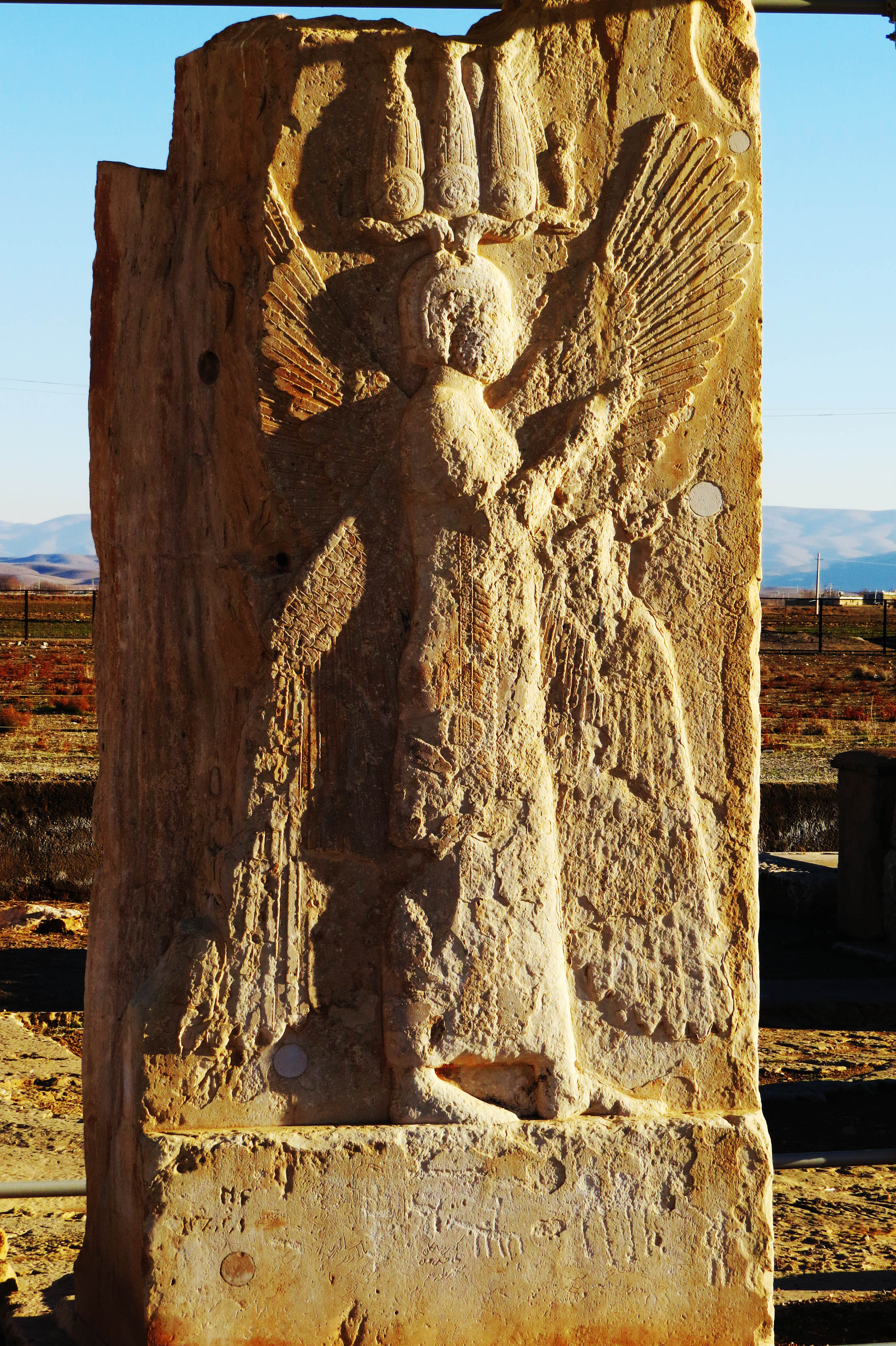
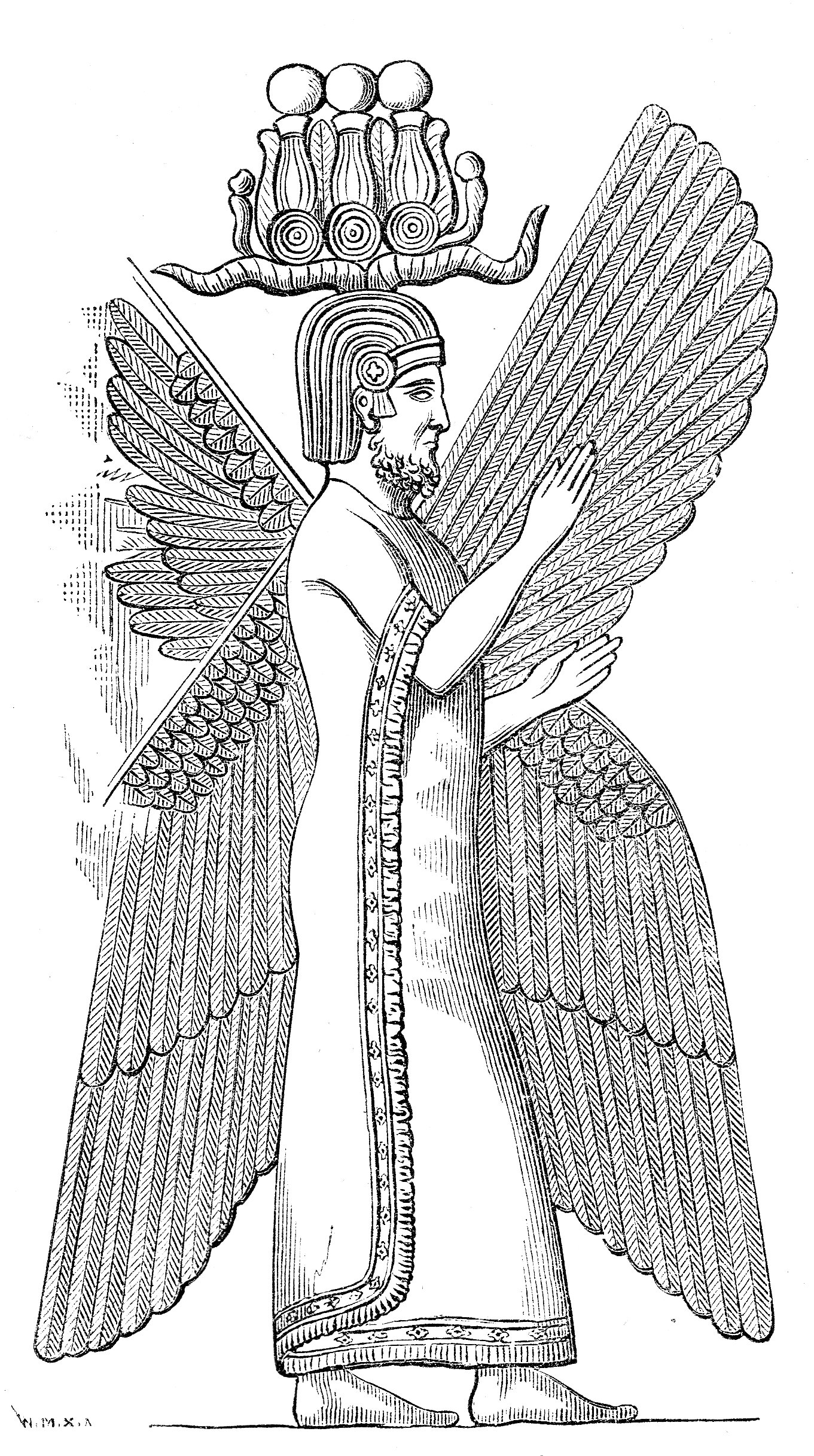
The relief of a winged genie, or according to some scholars, Cyrus the Great, in Pasargadae. The two horns of the Hemhem crown have been related to the name "Dhu al-Qarnayn".

In modern times, some Muslim scholars have argued in favour of Dhu al-Qarnayn being Cyrus the Great, the founder of the Achaemenid Empire and conqueror of Babylon. Proponents of this view cite Daniel's vision in the Old Testament where he saw a two-horned ram that represents "the kings of Media and Persia" (Daniel 8:20). They also cite the Hemhem crown (a type of ancient Egyptian crown mounted on a pair of long spiral ram's horns) of the Pasargadae winged genie, once thought by some to be a representation of Cyrus, though this is no longer accepted.

This theory was proposed in 1855 by the German philologist G. M. Redslob, but it did not gain followers in the west. Among Muslim commentators, it was first promoted by Sayyed Ahmad Khan (d. 1889), then by Maulana Abul Kalam Azad, whose commentary became popular in 1970s Pahlavi Iran, and generated wider acceptance over the years.

Brannon Wheeler argues that it would be possible to make that identification based on what is known of the conquests of Cyrus. However, the Arabic histories did not view Cyrus as a conqueror in the sense described in Q 18:83-102, and the early Quran commentaries did not identify Cyrus with Dhu al-Qarnayn.

=== Others ===
Other persons who either were identified with the Quranic figure or given the title Dhu al-Qarnayn:

- Afrīqish al-Ḥimyarī, king of Himyar. Al-Biruni in his book, The Remaining Signs of Past Centuries, listed a number of figures whom people thought to be Dhu al-Qarnayn. He favoured the opinion that Dhu al-Qarnayn was the Yamani prince Afrīqish, who conquered the Mediterranean and established a city called Afrīqiah. He was called Dhu al-Qarnayn because he ruled the lands of the rising and setting sun. To support his argument, al-Biruni cited Arabic onomastics, noting that compound names beginning with Dhū, such as Dhū Nuwās and Dhū Yazan, were common among the kings of Himyar.
- Fereydun. According to al-Tabari's Tarikh, some say Dhu al-Qarnayn the Elder (al-akbar), who lived in the era of Abraham, was the mythical Persian king Fereydun, whose name al-Tabari rendered as Afrīdhūn ibn Athfiyān.
- In an account attributed to Umar bin Khattab, Dhu al-Qarnayn is said to be an angel or part angel.
- Imru'l-Qays (died 328 CE), a prince of the Lakhmids of southern Mesopotamia, an ally first of Persia and then of Rome, celebrated in romance for his exploits.
- Messiah ben Joseph, a fabulous military saviour expected by Yemenite Jews.
- Darius the Great.
- Kisrounis, Parthian king.
- Abu Karib, another Himyarite king, is identified as Dhu'l-Qarnayn by Mustafa Khattab, in his translation of the Quran.
- Akhenaten, Pharaoh of Egypt who established the monotheistic Cult of Aten

== In later literature ==
Dhu al-Qarnayn, the traveller, proved a popular subject for later writers. In Al-Andalus, for instance, an Arabic translation of the Syriac Alexander Legend appeared, entitled Qissat Dhulqarnayn. This work explores Dhu al-Qarnayn's life – his upbringing, journeys, and eventual death. The text identifies Dhu al-Qarnayn with Alexander the Great and portrays him as the first person to complete the Hajj pilgrimage.

Another Hispano-Arabic legend featuring Dhu al-Qarnayn, representing Alexander, is the Hadith Dhulqarnayn (or the Leyenda de Alejandro). In one of the many Arabic and Persian versions depicting Alexander's encounter with Indian sages, the Persian Sunni Sufi theologian al-Ghazali (1058–1111) describes a scene where Dhu al-Qarnayn meets a people who own nothing but dig graves outside their homes. Their king explains that death is life's only certainty, a reason for their practices. Ghazali's interpretation found its way into the One Thousand and One Nights.

The esteemed medieval Persian poet Rumi (1207-1273) wrote about Dhu al-Qarnayn's eastward travels. Here, the hero climbs Mount Qaf, the emerald 'mother' of all mountains encircling the Earth, its veins spreading below every land. Upon Dhu al-Qarnayn's request, the mountain reveals how earthquakes occur: when God wills it, one of its veins pulsates, triggering a tremor. Atop this grand mountain, Dhu al-Qarnayn encounters Israfil (archangel Raphael), prepared to sound the trumpet on Judgement Day.

The Malay epic Hikayat Iskandar Zulkarnain links several Southeast Asian royal lines to Iskandar Zulkarnain; this includes the Minangkabau royalty of Central Sumatra and the Cholan emperor Rajendra I in the Malay Annals.

The scholarly consensus on the story of Dhul Qarnayn is that the authors of the Qur'an adapted from the Syriac story of Alexander the Great as part of their Scriptures during the end of Muhammad's lifetime.

As Van Blade puts it in his conclusion:

"The main conclusion reached here is that a Syriax text quite current and important

in the last years of Muhammad's life was adapted for twenty verses of the Qur'an. This is not entirely new, since Noldeke made a similar argument in 1890. Nor is it surprising, since the Qur'an relates· many other well known ancient stories in its own way to deliver its own message, as Muslims generally accept. However, it is now shown beyond any reasonable doubt that this is the case for a text contemporary with Muhammad. Moreover, what is most important for our understanding of the adaptation of the Alexander Legend in the Qur'an is not the fact of the borrowing but rather the way in which the particular religious and political message associated with the Alexander legend was used, truncated, and altered for new purposes."

== See also ==
- Gates of Alexander
- Iron Gate (Central Asia)
- Ergenekon

== Sources ==
- Ball, Warwick (2002). Rome in the East: The Transformation of an Empire. Routledge. ISBN 9781134823871. Archived from the original on 23 May 2024.
- Berberian, Manuel (2014). Earthquakes and Coseismic Surface Faulting on the Iranian Plateau. Elsevier. ISBN 978-0444632975.
- Bietenholz, Peter G. (1994). Historia and fabula: myths and legends in historical thought from antiquity to the modern age. Brill. ISBN 978-9004100633. Archived from the original on 23 May 2024.
- Cook, David B. (2005). Contemporary Muslim Apocalyptic Literature. Syracuse University Press. ISBN 9780815630586. Archived from the original on 23 May 2024.
- Durmaz, Reyhan (2022). Stories Between Islam and Christianity. University of California Press.
- Cook, David B. (2013). "Gog and Magog". In Fleet, Kate; Krämer, Gudrun; Matringe, Denis; Nawas, John; Rowson, Everett (eds.). Encyclopaedia of Islam, Three. doi:10.1163/1573-3912_ei3_COM_27495.
- Ernst, Carl W. (2011). How to Read the Qur'an: A New Guide, with Select Translations. University of North Carolina Press. ISBN 9781134823871.
- Glassé, Cyril; Smith, Huston (2003). The New Encyclopedia of Islam. Rowman Altamira. ISBN 9780759101906. Archived from the original on 23 May 2024.
- Merhavy, Menahem (2015). "Religious Appropriation of National Symbols in Iran: Searching for Cyrus the Great". Iranian Studies. 48 (6): 933–948. doi:10.1080/00210862.2014.922277. S2CID 144725336.
- Netton, Ian Richard (2006). A Popular Dictionary of Islam. Routledge. ISBN 9781135797737. Archived from the original on 23 May 2024.
- Pinault, David (1992). Story-Telling Techniques in the Arabian Nights. BRILL. ISBN 978-9004095304. Archived from the original on 23 May 2024.
- Sekunda, Nicholas (2010). "Changes in Achaemenid Royal Dress". In Curtis, John; Simpson, St John (eds.). The World of Achaemenid Persia. History, Art and Society in Iran and the Ancient Near East. I. B. Taurus. ISBN 9781848853461.
- Stoneman, Richard (2003). "Alexander the Great in Arabic Tradition". In Panayotakis, Stelios; Zimmerman, Maaike; Keulen, Wytse (eds.). The Ancient Novel and Beyond. Brill Academic Publishers NV. ISBN 978-90-04-12999-3.
- Van Donzel, Emeri J.; Schmidt, Andrea Barbara (2010). Gog and Magog in Early Eastern Christian and Islamic Sources. Brill. ISBN 978-9004174160. Archived from the original on 23 May 2024.
- Wasserstrom, Steven M. (2014). Between Muslim and Jew: The Problem of Symbiosis Under Early Islam. Princeton University Press. ISBN 9781400864133. Archived from the original on 23 May 2024.
- Watt, W. Montgomery (1960–2007). "al-Iskandar". In Bearman, P.; Bianquis, Th.; Bosworth, C.E.; van Donzel, E.; Heinrichs, W.P. (eds.). Encyclopaedia of Islam, Second Edition. doi:10.1163/1573-3912_islam_SIM_3630.
- Wheeler, Brannon M. (1998). "Moses or Alexander? Early Islamic Exegesis of Qurʾān 18:60-65". Journal of Near Eastern Studies. 57 (3): 191–215. doi:10.1086/468638. S2CID 162366963. Archived from the original on 14 December 2021.
- Wheeler, Brannon M. (2002). Moses in the Qur'an and Islamic Exegesis. Routledge. ISBN 9781136128905. Archived from the original on 23 May 2024.
- Yamanaka, Yuriko; Nishio, Tetsuo (2006). The Arabian Nights and Orientalism: Perspectives from East and West. I.B.Tauris. ISBN 9781850437680. Archived from the original on 23 May 2024.
- Daneshgar, Majid (10 June 2016). "Dhū l-Qarnayn in modern Malay commentaries". In Daneshgar, Majid; Riddell, Peter G.; Rippin, Andrew (eds.). The Qur'an in the Malay-Indonesian World: Context and Interpretation. Routledge. ISBN 978-1-317-29476-4.
- Van Bladel, Kevin (2008). "The Alexander Legend in the Qur'an 18:83-102". In Reynolds, Gabriel Said (ed.). The Qurʼān in Its Historical Context. Routledge. Archived from the original on 13 February 2022.
