= Hadith Dhi'l-Qarnayn =

The Hadith Dhi'l-Qarnayn (Note: Dhi'l-Qarnayn is the genitive of Dhu'l-Qarnayn in Arabic.) (Arabic: حديث ذي القرنين Ḥadīṯ Ḏī l-Qarnayn), also known as the Leyenda de Alejandro, is an anonymous Hispano-Arabic legend of Alexander the Great (whom it identifies as Dhu'l-Qarnayn, a figure known from the eighteenth chapter of the Quran). It dates to the 15th century.

As with other Arabic Alexander legends in the tradition of the Alexander Romance literature, the story describes Alexander's journeys across the world (such as an encounter with the king of China), his relationship with the mystical prophet Khidr, and the piety of the main character, Alexander.

It is closely related to the Sīrat al-Iskandar, including in how both texts interpolate from the Syriac Alexander Legend, such as in how it describes the construction of the Gates of Alexander designed to keep out and confine Gog and Magog. The text identifies Gog and Magog with the Khazars, a semi-nomadic Turkic ethnic group.

== Manuscripts and editions ==
The Hadith Dhi'l-Qarnayn is known from one manuscript, though that manuscript is missing the first five folios; as such, the extant version begins mid-sentence. An Arabic edition with a translation into Spanish was published in 1929 by E. García Gómez.

== See also ==
- Horns of Alexander
- Iskandarnama
- Qissat al-Iskandar
