= Abu Sulayman Sijistani =

10th century Persian Islamic humanist philosopher

Abu Sulayman Muhammad al-Sijistani, (Arabic: أبو محمد سليمان السجستاني) nicknamed al-Mantiqi ('the Logician'; Arabic: المنطقي), c. 912 – c. 985 CE, named for his origins in the Sijistan or Sistan region in present-day Eastern Iran and Southern Afghanistan, was a leading Islamic humanist philosopher in Baghdad.

Deeply religious, he regarded both religion and philosophy as valid and true, but separate, concerned with different issues, and proceeding by different means. He thus rejected the claims of the theologians employing Ilm al-Kalam as having built a theology "proved" by rationality and of the Brethren of Purity as offering a synthesis of philosophy and religion.

His best-known work is Siwān al-Ḥikma "Vessel of Wisdom", a history of philosophy from the beginning to his own time.
