= Ibn Hindu =

11th-century Persian poet, statesman and physician

Abū Al-Faraj ʿAlī ibn al-Husayn ibn Hindū (d. 1032) was a Persian poet, a man of letters, and a practitioner of Galenic medicine coming from Rey. Scholars have posited multiple explanations for his name, including that he was Persian and from Hindujān, his possible Indian heritage, and that he was an Arab descendant of the Islamic prophet, Muhammad.

== Education ==
His philosophical and medical training was extensive and he studied under Abu al-Hassan al-Amiri, Abū Al-Khayr al-Hasan ibn Siwār, and Abū al-Khayr ibn al-Khammār. He traveled to Arrajan in 965, where he continued his services for the Buwayhids.

He wrote in Arabic. He was most famous for his works of poetry than as a physician. He was also held in high esteem by his students who would travel to study with him. He was employed at 'Adud al-Dawla's dīwān. His approach to religion has been described as open-minded.

== Publications ==
Ibn Hindū. Miftah al-tibb wa-minhaj al-tullab. [The key to the science of medicine and the students' guide]. Mohaghegh M, Daneshpajuh MT, eds. Tehran: Institute of Islamic Studies, McGill University Tehran Branch, in collaboration with Tehran University, 1989.

Later translated by Aidi Tibi as The Key to Medicine and a Guide for Students. The book, espousing the virtues of medicine, has three primary arguments. The first is to demonstrate the noble qualities of being a physician, and to locate the role of physicians within a hierarchy of prestigious professions. The second is to reinforce a hierarchy between those who see reason and accept medicine and the erroneous logic of disbeliever. And finally, ibn Hindū seeks to show the superiority of Dogmatists over Methodists and Empiricists.

The above work makes mention to the existence of A Treatise Encouraging the Study of Philosophy, but only a few excerpts of it survive today.

Abū al-Faraj ibn Hindū, al-Kalim al-rūḥānīyah fī al-ḥikam al-Yūnānīyah (Bayrūt, 2001).
