= Syriac Alexander Romance =

Alexander legend in Syriac

The Syriac Alexander Romance (known in Syriac as the Tašʿītā d̄ʾAleksandrōs) is an anonymous work of Christian Syriac literature, translated into Syriac in the sixth or seventh century from the earlier Greek tradition of the Alexander Romance. A different text, the Syriac Alexander Legend, appears as an appendix in manuscripts of the Syriac Alexander Romance, but the inclusion of the Legend into manuscripts of the Romance is the work of later redactors and does not reflect an original relationship between the two.

The Syriac Romance had an enormous influence, with versions of it being produced across late antiquity, the Middle Ages, and the early modern period in Europe, Asia, and Africa. In one study by Friedrich Pfister, over two hundred derivations, translations, and versions of it were recorded.

The text was first translated into English in 1889 by E. A. Wallis Budge.

== Provenance and date ==
The Syriac Romance belongs to the α recension of the Greek Romance, as is represented by the Greek manuscript A (Paris. 1711). In this way, it is like other works of the Alexander literature tradition, like the Res gestae Alexandri Macedonis of Julius Valerius Alexander Polemius, the Armenian Alexander Romance and the Historia de preliis of Leo the Archpriest.

Based on its surviving manuscripts, some historians have suggested it originated in upper Mesopotamia and that its author was a Nestorian religious figure (like a priest or monk). Nevertheless, its manuscripts are rather late and may provide little support to this theory, and many Syriac speaking Christian communities other than Nestorians were available as candidates for the creation of the text. At the same time, almost all identifiable Syriac authors were clergymen, and so the view that the author of the Romance was also a clergyman remains justified. Scholars also continue to believe that the text was produced sometime from the late sixth to the first half of the seventh century, potentially in the aftermath of the Byzantine–Sasanian War of 602–628 which some believe is a plausible political context for the genesis of the text. Little internal evidence exists for the dating of the text, although the name Khusrau is used instead of Xerxes, which most likely refers either to Khosrow I (r. 531–579) or Khosrow II (r. 590–628).

Theodor Nöldeke has influentially argued that it was translated from a lost Middle-Persian (Pahlavi) version of the Alexander Romance, though this theory has been disputed in recent decades in favor of the alternative hypothesis that it represents a direct translation from the Greek, which now represents the consensus.

The terminus ante quem for the date of the text is the 8th century, as the first translations of the Syriac Alexander Romance into Arabic were made in the 8th and 9th centuries, such as the Qissat al-Iskandar. By correlating the style of the translation in line with the phases of Greek-to-Syriac translations defined by Sebastian Brock, and by pinpointing particular historical figures mentioned in the text, a date for the composition of the text very early in the seventh century can be proposed.

== Structure ==
As with the Greek Romance, the Syriac version is divided into three main sections (or books). In the Syriac, the first book contains 47 chapters, the second 14 chapters, and the third 24 chapters (for a total of 85 chapters). The Syriac text lacks a prologue but does have a conclusion which appears in the 22nd chapter of the third book in Budge's edition. The content is structured into various themes or topoi, such as battles, geoanthropological information, biographical elements and so forth.

== Plot ==
Generally speaking, the Syriac Romance follows the Greek closely in terms of the overall plot. It is a pluri-thematic text and can be divided into three main narratives:

- Alexander's youth and education
- His military workings against Greeks, Macedonians, Persians, and Indians
- Alexander's testament and death

The story begins by describing how the Egyptian Pharaoh Nectanebo II, learning of the treason of the gods against him, escapes from Egypt to Macedonia. He comes into contact with the king, Philip II, and his wife Olympias. Pretending to be the god Amun, he impregnates Olympias, and Philip is unsuspecting that the child is not his. Once the child is born, Philip names him Alexander. Alexander begins to be educated by the wisest men available to the court, and at an early age displays his military prowess, such as at a horse racing competition. It is not long before Alexander begins to desire establishing a universal empire. He goes on to conquer the Greek and Macedonian cities and the Achaemenid (Persian) Empire. During the "farewell discourse", a vaticinium ex eventu prophecy unveils the plot to kill Alexander. The narrative-cycle of Alexander's death is formed by his last will and death. He is buried in Alexandria, Egypt, the greatest city he founded during his journey and conquests.

The plot as recounted above follows that of the Greek Romance. However, the Syriac Romance also contains several of its own episodes not found in the original, such as Alexander's journey to China, the killing of a dragon by feeding it an oxen filled with gypsum, pitch, and sulfur, Alexander's desert-journey fighting nomads, founding the cities of Samarkand and Merv, and construction of a temple of Rhea/Nâni. Other changes include a loss of several contents of the Greek, a significant transformation and expansion of Alexander's letter to Aristotle (the 'miracle letter'), and unique adventures recorded after the episode of the 'night of horrors'. The story that was to be gain the greatest resonance in later literature would be Alexander's visit to China; though entirely fictitious, it emerged as a product of some (limited) cultural exchanges with the region in periods after Alexander lived. No substantive knowledge of China exists in the text, although it is aware that an important export from the region was silk.

== Manuscripts ==
Five manuscripts of the Syriac Romance are known, which have been termed A through E. The following comments and description of the manuscripts are quoted from Monferrer-Sala 2011.

- A = BL. Add. 25875. Paper. 36 quires. 362 leaves divided in two columns of 28 lines, about 8 7/8 in. by 6 1/8 in. Good strangelā writing with numerous vowel points. Dated in 1708–9 A.D. (= AG 2020–21).
- B = American Oriental Society. Paper. 18 quires. 185 leaves with 20 lines per page, about 8 3/8 in. by 6 5/8 in. Good strangelā writing with numerous vowel points. Dated in 1844 A.D. (= AG 2155). It is a copy made by the Rev J. Perkins in Urmia from an unknown older MS.27 The MS B El MS B has several glosses in fellīḥī, the neoAramaic dialectal variety in Urmia.
- D = Owned by E.A. Wallis Budge. Paper. 12 quires. 123 leaves paginated in Syriac graphemes (ʾ-rkg) with 22 lines per page, about 14 in. by 8 ½. accurate bold strangelā writing with numerous vowel points. The text is the copy ordered by Budge in 1886 to a scribe called ʾŌšaʿnā from a MS dated in 1848 A.D. (= AG 2159), whose errors were corrected by the copyist at several places.
- E = Owned by E.A. Wallis Budge. Paper. 15 quires. 160 leaves with 20 lines per page, about 9 ¼ in. by 6 ¾. It is another copy of a text ordered by Budge, also from 1886, from an old Nestorian MS, kept in the Library of Alqōš. The copy, made by a “first-rate scribe” was contrasted with the original and corrected by the Chaldean Patriarch.30 It is another text whose copy was commissioned by Budge, also in 1886, starting from an old Nestorian MS that remains in the Alqōš library. The copy made by a ‘first rate scribe’ was contrasted with the original and corrected by the Chaldean Patriarch.

== See also ==
- Alexander the Great in legend
- Qissat al-Iskandar
