= Collatio Alexandri et Dindimi =

The Collatio Alexandri et Dindimi (or Correspondence of Alexander and Dindimus) is one of the ancient Greek Indian tractates. It consists of a fictional correspondence between Alexander the Great, king of Macedon, and Dindimus, king of the Brahmans. There are five letters, three by Alexander, who begins and ends the correspondence, and two by Dindimus. The Greek text is lost; it survives only in Latin translation.

Introductory epigram by Alcuin, who sent a copy of the Collatio to Charlemagne

Start of the Collatio in a manuscript from the 820s

Although composed only in Late Antiquity, the Collatio originated in the Cynics' criticism of Alexander. The finished form of the work, however, is a defence of Alexander against such criticism or possibly against early Christian criticism. Over time the replies of Dindimus came to be appreciated more and the text even edited to weaken Alexander's arguments. Three stages in the text's history, represented by three versions, have been identified.

== Title ==
The full Latin title of the work in the earliest manuscripts is Alexandri, regis Macedonum, et Dindimi, regis Bragmanorum, de philosophia per litteras facta collatio, which supports the short form Collatio Alexandri et Dindimi. The common form in the ablative case, Collatio Alexandri cum Dindimo per litteras facta (often shortened to Collatio Alexandri cum Dindimo), originates with Bernhard Kübler in 1888.

The work is not consistently titled in the manuscripts. The word collatio (correspondence) in particular is sometimes replaced with epistola(e) (letter[s]). It is sometimes impossible to tell from a title alone or a table of contents whether the work indicated is the Collatio or rather the De moribus Bragmanorum, which is not a letter but does contain a dialogue between Alexander and Dindimus. Attested titles of the Collatio include:

- Alexandri Magni regis Macedonum et Dindimi regis Bragmanorum de philosophia per litteras facta collatio
- Alexandri regis Macedonum et Dindimi regis Bragmanorum de philosophia per litteras facta collatio
- Epistola Alexandri Magni ad Dindimum regem Bragmanorum
- Epistola Alexandri ad Dindimum magistrum Bragmanorum
- Epistola Alexandri ad Bragmannos

Richard Stoneman translates the title Correspondence of Alexander and Dindimus.

== Origin and purpose ==
The Collatio is an imaginary or fictional work. It was composed somewhere between the 4th and 6th centuries AD, with most estimates placing it around the year 400. It was probably written in response to the Commonitorium Palladii, a work in which Dindimus serves as "an implicitly Christian spokesman" against Alexander. David Ross sees it as a rhetorical exercise, in which Dindimus' promise in the Commonitorium to continue writing to Alexander is taken as a launch point for a correspondence debating two civilizations.

As the work gives Alexander the final word, it is usually read as a defence of him and of Greek civilization. The criticism embodied in Dindimus' letters originates with the Cynics in ancient Greece, although by the time the Collatio was written that criticism had been picked up by early Christianity. Over time the replies of Dindimus came to be appreciated more and the text even edited to weaken Alexander's arguments.

== Synopsis ==
The Collatio consists of five letters of uneven length, being 2, 21, 1, 3 and 6 paragraphs long, respectively. Alexander begins and ends the correspondence. Dindimus praises his people's asceticism and criticizes the idolatry of the Macedonians. Alexander, who began as curious, defends his people and criticizes the Brahmans.

=== First letter ===
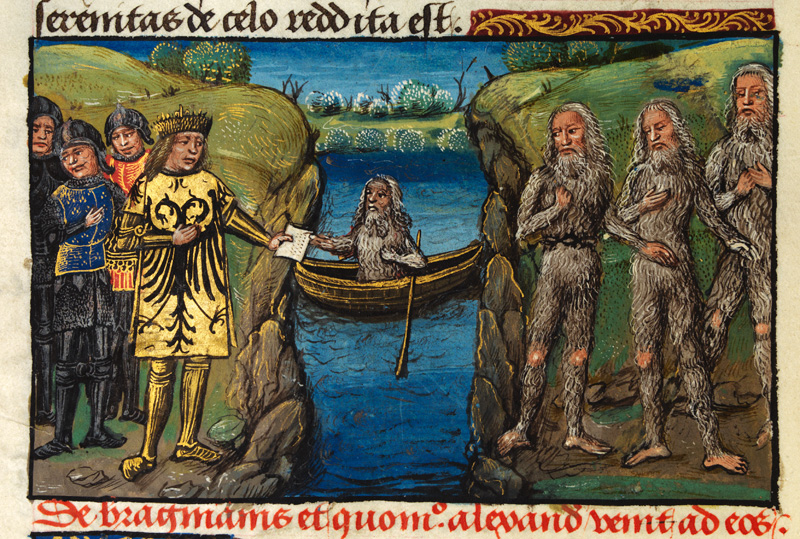
Alexander sends a letter to the Brahmans, an illustration of the Collatio III from the manuscript Peniarth 481

Alexander opens the correspondence by asking Dindimus about the habits and lifestyle of the Brahmans. He particularly wants to know if it is true what he has heard, that the Brahamans do not exploit the land and sea. He teases the idea that he may, "if possible ... follow your way of life." To secure a response, he writes:

It is a good and useful practice that men should share with one another, and no man suffers any loss in his goodness when he does good to another, however he does it. It is just as if one man were carrying a lit torch and other men were to come and light other torches from the first: it would not lose its own light. So it is with goodness.

=== Second letter ===
Dindimus is not persuaded, "since it will be of no advantage for me to describe our life and customs: you will have no time to read my letter, busy as you are with waging wars." Nevertheless, he responds. His first letter is two thirds of the total length of the Collatio.

The Brahmans, Dindimus claims, take only what nature provides, know no illnesses and are all equal in poverty. As they are not slaves of wealth, they are free. They do not hunt, fish or plough. They have no laws and no buildings, but live in caves. They cover themselves in papyrus or else go about naked and they have intercourse only to procreate. Incest, adultery and abortion are unknown to them. They do not make weapons or go to war. They do not meditate and do not bathe. They reject slavery, since "it is cruel to press a man into slavery whom nature has decreed to be our brother, and who has been created by the same heavenly father as we are." They bury their dead. They do not have the art of theatre—since nature offers better spectacles—or the sport of horse racing, do not engage in trade by sea and do not colonize new lands. Their religion does not have sacrifices, temples or altars, since God the creator is word, spirit and mind. His worship is bloodless.

Dindimus criticizes the Macedonians for their polytheism. They can expect to wind up in hell with Tantalus, Cerberus and the Hydra. Their philosophy is "all lies". He also criticizes their exploration of the ocean, which leads them to "say that Asia and Africa come to an end after a little distance", and their trade with distant lands. If Brahmans wish to laugh, they read the deeds of the Macedonians. They lack the Greeks' "amusements", but they have many pleasures:

We see the sky resplendent with stars, the sun glowing in his aerial chariot and his rays illumining the whole world. We see the sea maintain its constant dark hue; and when it is roused by tempests, it does not overwhelm the neighbouring land but embraces it like a sister; and every day we can see the various kinds of fish, and the dolphins leaping and sporting in its waves. We delight in seeing the fields in flower, and the sweet scents which rise from them to our nostrils, so that our eyes are satiated with the sight as well as our bodies; and we enjoy all places where there are groves and springs, and love to hear the birds sing.

=== Third letter ===
Alexander's messenger deliver's the first reply to Dindimus, from the Middle Engilsh Alexander and Dindimus

In his short response, Alexander concludes that the Brahmans' "life and customs are closer to stupidity than to wisdom." They lack normal human dispositions and so wish to destroy all human customs and arts. For this reason, Alexander accuses them of either pride (considering themselves gods) or envy (desiring to be equal to God): "You must either think that you are gods yourselves or have some grudge against our gods."

=== Fourth letter ===
In his defence, Dindimus argues that the Brahmans are foreigners in this world and destined for more. God "acted so that the world could not stand without a great variety of things, and gave man judgement in order to distinguish between" good and bad. The Brahmans are not proud for abjuring evil and following good. Dindimus flings Alexander's accusation of pride back at him: "When you are so inflated with excessive prosperity, you forget that you are only born of man."

Dindimuis also criticizes the Macedonians for claiming "that God does not care for human affairs", yet building temples and engaging in sacrifices, which are not pleasing to God in any case. For their pride, the same fate awaits them as befell Enceladus and Salmoneus, "according to the philosophers".

=== Fifth letter ===
In the final letter, Alexander attacks the asceticism of the Brahmans. His tone is harsh. The Brahmans' homeland is inaccessible, so they boast of their moderation. They lack iron and do not cultivate the land, so are dependent on nature and unfree, like animals. Like animals, they lack laws and literacy. Their women are unadorned because they are poor. Even their chastity, because it is mere rule-following, is not praiseworthy. The Brahmans are not blessed but imprisoned in an impoverished land. The Macedonians philosophy of life is completely different:

You say that your women wear no ornaments, and that there is no fornication or adultery among you. It would be cause for amazement if you were to practise this restraint voluntarily; but in fact you do it because you find no pleasure in the appearance of your women, unadorned as they are; you remain chaste because of the absence of any stimulus to be otherwise. You say that you have no interest in study and that you require no pity nor pity others. All these are things you have in common with the beasts, which, because they are unable to recognise what is good, take no pleasure in anything good. But we rational men, who have free will, have been provided by nature with many comforts to improve our lives.

The Macedonians revel in the joys of the senses. Sensuality rather than asceticism is at the heart of their lives. Dancing, singing, sweet tastes, gentle touch are all gifts to be enjoyed. Alexander criticizes the Brahmans for failing to enjoy all that nature offers. They will be judged either proud (for rejecting the gifts) or envious (since the Macedonains are better endowed than they).

== Themes and interpretations ==
The concept of natural law (lex naturalis) is central to the Collatio. The Brahmans live in harmony with nature and equality with each other, living pure but impoverished lives. In Dindimus' philosophy, nature must not be contaminated or violated. He accuses the Macedonians of have discoloured the rivers Pactolus and Hermus among other abominations, such as navigating the ocean. Alexander considers the Brahmans' natural law to be torture and argues that in no case can humanity live without taking from the resources of nature.

The Collatio presents the disagreement between Alexander and Dindimus as a contest of philosophies. The Brahman philosophy avoids inflicting pain and raises continence to a necessity. To Alexander, the Brahmans impose on themselves punishment as if they wer criminals. The Macedonians, on the other hand, do not live naturally but rationally. They are free to choose how to live the best life. According to Chiara Di Serio, "it is the possibility of choosing that characterizes the Macedonians, and not the necessity of constriction."

The Brahmans of the Collatio are constructed to "lead an existence absolutely deprived of all the features which are the characteristics of Western civilization and that appear in the text as redundant and annoying." The realm of Dindimus is a utopia that does not exist in reality and Macedonian civilization is made to look good by comparison.

== Sources ==
The historical Dindimus is Dandamis, an Indian sage encountered by the Macedonian army at Taxila during its Indian campaign in 326 BC. This historical encounter, which may or may not have involved a personal meeting with Alexander himself, is recorded in the Indica of Megasthenes (as cited by Strabo), in Arrian's Anabasis, in the work of Onesicritus cited by Strabo and in Plutarch's Parallel Lives. The only writings attributed to Dandamis are the two letters in the Collatio, which are not authentic.

The account of Onesicritus in particular has been seen as an influence on the Collatio by Lellia Cracco Ruggini. According to Thomas Hahn, however, it is "a totally imaginative work" in its details, with only its main figures and setting borrowed from historical sources.

The figure of Dindimus as critic of polytheism and defender of asceticism has been seen as influenced by Christianity. Julius Makowsky and Camillo Morelli saw its author as a Christian rhetorician or ascetic, respectively. Edmond Liénard argued that the responses of Dindimus were based in part on by the Apologeticus of Tertullian.

== Textual history ==
Given its complex textual history, it is "difficult to speak of the Collatio without becoming confused." The Greek original of the Collatio is lost. All surviving versions of the text go back to a single Latin translation. Three versions of the Latin text are known:

- Collatio I, the oldest form, is often found in manuscripts attached to the Zacher Epitome of the Res gestae Alexandri Macedonis, Julius Valerius's translation of Pseudo-Callisthenes's Alexander Romance, and to the Epistola Alexandri ad Aristotelem. It may date to as early as the 4th century, but was certainly circulating by 700. Marc Steinmann proposes to date it to the 410s. Unlike the later forms, Collatio I is not generally interpolated into other works. Its incipit is Saepius ad aures meas fando pervenit and its explicit quod a meliore praestentur.
- Collatio II is known from a single manuscript from Bamberg. It is a revision of Collatio I with a less rhetorical style and its paganism toned down. It was probably produced in or near Naples in the 10th century, at the same time as Leo the Archpriest's new translation of the Romance, Nativitas et victoria Alexandri Magni regis, with which it shares the manuscript.

Dindimus receives a letter from a messenger, as illustrated in a copy of Alexander and Dindimus

- Collatio III is an elaboration of Collatio II that was interpolated into later recensions of Leo's Nativitas et vitoria, which go under the title Historia de preliis. It is found in the J^{1}, J^{2} and J^{3} recensions of the Historia, specifically. Only very rarely was the Collatio III was transmitted independently of the Historia. Since the Historia was widely translated into European vernaculars, Collatio III was also. Translations include:
  - the Old French Roman d'Alexandre en prose
  - the Middle High German version of Rudolf von Ems
  - the Middle English Prose Life of Alexander and three alliterative poems: Romance of Alisaunder, Alexander and Dindimus and Wars of Alexander

The Middle Irish Scéla Alaxandair maic Pilip, perhaps from the 11th century, incorporates the Collatio, which was excerpted and sometimes circulated independently. In the early 15th century, Wichwolt included a version of the Collatio in his Middle High German Cronica Allexandri des grossen konigs. It was extracted under the title Dindimus Buch. Later in the 15th century, Johann Hartlieb incorporated the Collatio into his German translation and reworking of the Alexander Romance, called Das Buch der Geschicht des Grossen Allexanders, of which the relevant portion was extracted and circulated independently as the Konig Dindimus Buech. The Wichwolt and Hartlieb versions are distinct.

The Collatio was sometimes epitomized, in which abbreviated form it is often preceded in manuscripts by the Epistula Bragmanorum ad Alexandrum, a letter sent by the Brahmans to Alexander to dissuade him from attacking them. This combination——Epistula and Collatio epitome—is incorporated into the Speculum historiale of Vincent of Beauvais, the Polychronicon of Ranulph Higden and the Eulogium historiarum sive temporis (based on Ranulph).

Richard Stoneman has translated the Collatio into modern English.

== Manuscripts ==
Although the Collatio is frequently found alongside the Romance (in one of its many forms) or the letter to Aristotle, it is an independent creation and not directly related to them textually. There are about 100 known manuscripts of the Collatio I. In David Ross's 1956 analysis, it appears alongside the Zacher Epitome and the Epistola in 30 manuscripts, alongside the Epistola alone in eight, alongside the Epitome alone in one and alongside neither in 26 manuscripts. The earliest manuscripts, dating to the 9th century, are:

- Brussels, Royal Library of Belgium, 2839-43, the earliest manuscript, from the 820s
- The Hague, Royal Library of the Netherlands, 830
- The Hague, Royal Library of the Netherlands, 73 B 23
- Leiden, University Library, Voss. Q 20
- Paris, Bibliothèque nationale de France, Lat. 7561
- Paris, Bibliothèque nationale de France, Lat. 7886

As Collationes II and III are only found as interpolations in versions of the Alexander Romance, they do not have a manuscript tradition independent of those versions (Nativitas et victoria and Historia de preliis). Collatio II is found in a single manuscript:

- Bamberg, Staatsbibliothek, Msc.Hist.3 (olim E.III.14)

Collatio III was occasionally excerpted from the Historia de preliis. Excerpts of this kind occur in Godfrey of Viterbo's Pantheon and James of Vitry's Historia Hierosolymitana. Godfrey's versions appears, with modifications, excerpted in a single manuscript, while James's version is excerpted with modifications in three manuscripts. In Godfrey's edited version, the Christianization of Dindimus is complete and Alexander is reduced to an arrogant blowhard. A sixth letter is also added, giving Dindimus the last word. In James's version, Alexander's replies are eliminated.

The independently transmitted Middle German versions are found in four manuscripts:

- Sankt Gallen, Stiftsbibliothek, 628 (Wichwolt)
- Berlin, Staatsbibliothek, mgf 548 (Hartlieb)
- Heidelberg, University Library, Cpg 172 (Hartlieb)
- Vienna, Austrian National Library, Ser. nova 3825 (Hartlieb)

The Collatio was rarely illustrated. There are no known illustrated copies of Collationes I or II. There are two manuscripts that contain illustrations for the interpolated version Collatio III:

- Aberystwyth, National Library of Wales, Peniarth 481, has one miniature
- Leipzig, University Library, Rep. II 143, has three miniatures

Dindimus reproving Alexander for worshipping an idol, a representation of Cupid

The Middle English verse adaptation Alexander and Dindimus is also illustrated in a single manuscript:

- Oxford, Bodleian Library, Bodley 264, has eight miniatures

== Reception and influence ==
Of the Indian tractates, the Collatio is exceeded in influence only by the Epistola Alexandri ad Aristotelem, a fictional letter from Alexander to Aristotle. According to Ross, it "was regarded as a useful tract on the ascetic life and so makes a frequent appearance in collections of a moral and religious character." In the Middle Ages, Dindimus was a standard example of the virtuous heathen.

Older than any surviving manuscript is a reference to the Collatio in an epigram of Alcuin of York addressed to Charlemagne, to whom he is sending copies of the correspondence of Paul and Seneca and that between Alexander and Dindimus. Among Alcuin's poems, this epigram is Carmen 81. Alcuin died in 804 and this epigram is also evidence of the early circulation of the Collatio in England. The epigram reads:

Gens Bragmanna quidem miris quae moribus extat
Hic legitur; lector mente fidem videat.
Hic Pauli et Senecae breviter responsa leguntur:
Quaenam notavit nomine quisque suo.
Quae tibi, magne decus mundi et clarissime Caesar,
Albinus misit munera parva tuus.

Translation:

Here: read about the Brahmans' extraordinary ways;
Reader: picture their faith in your mind's eye.
Here: read the brief exchanges from Seneca and Paul,
Each letter signed by name.
Caesar, known to all, great glory of the world:
Albinus, yours alone, sent them as a token to you.

Alcuin may have been impressed by the asceticism of the Brahmans, but he may also have been motivated to send the work to Charlemagne by the picture of Alexander as a philosopher-king. Peter Abelard quotes from the Collatio to demonstrate that Dindimus was one of the four kings who foresaw the coming of Christ. Later medieval sources that cite the Collatio include Jacobus de Cessolis, the Travels of Sir John Mandeville and the Confessio Amantis of John Gower. In his chronicle, Martin of Opava condenses both of Dindimus' replies into a single letter and only mentions that an indignant Alexander responded. Renart le contrefait cites the Collatio against idolatry. Vincent of Beauvais in his Speculum historiale turns Alexander's final response into praise of Dindimus. The anonymous Eulogium historiarum sive temporis swaps the places of the correspondents, giving Dindimus three letters, including the opening and closing. Dindimus also gets the last word in the compilation of Alexander material in the manuscript Sloane 289. In general, in the opinion of George Cary, the

... various Christian perversions of the Collatio signify the adaptation of a rhetorial controversy to a moral use; the answers of Alexander to be found in the original text are too disturbing, too convincing, and too subtly pagan to be allowed a place. ... The dull fervour of Dindimus in the Collatio was swallowed by Christian moralists; they cut away the controversy from the episode, and brought him forward as the conventional mediaeval ascetic. Alexander appears as the man who received his strictures ...

The Collatio continued to be cited into the modern era. The playwright behind The Drinking Academy (c. 1626), possibly Thomas Randolph, used it. The Upright Lives of the Heathens, Briefly Noted: Or, Epistles and Discourses Betwixt Alexander the Conqueror, and Dindimius, King of the Brachmans, a chapbook possibly by Thomas Tryon and published in 1683, is a late traditional treatment of the Collatio as a moralizing work. Robert Dodsley adapted it for his Oeconomy of Human Life in 1751.

== See also ==
- Letters of Alexander the Great
- Alexander the Great in legend

== Works cited ==
- Arnold, F. E. A. (1964). "The Source of the Alexander History in B.M. MS Sloane 289". Medium Ævum. 33 (3): 195–199. JSTOR 43627115.
- Barlow, Claude W. (1938). Epistolae Senecae ad Paulum et Pauli ad Senecam <Quae Vocantur>. American Academy in Rome.
- Bullough, Donald (2004). Alcuin: Achievement and Reputation. Brill.
- Cary, George (1954). "A Note on the Mediaeval History of the Collatio Alexandri cum Dindimo". Classica et Mediaevalia. 15: 124–129.
- Cary, George (1956). The Medieval Alexander. Cambridge University Press.
- Di Serio, Chiara (2018). "The Collatio Alexandri et Dindimi: The 'Natural' Space of the Brahmans". Forma Breve. 15: 135–141.
- Hahn, Thomas (1978). "The Indian Tradition in Western Medieval Intellectual History". Viator. 9: 213–234. doi:10.1484/J.VIATOR.2.301547.
- Hahn, Thomas (1980). "Notes on Ross's Check-list of Alexander Texts". Scriptorium. 34 (2): 275–278.
- Magoun, Francis Peabody, ed. (1929). The Gests of King Alexander of Macedon: Two Middle-English Alliterative Fragments, Alexander A and Alexander B. Harvard University Press.
- Muckensturm-Poulle, Claire (2006). "Dandamis". Brill's New Pauly Online. Brill. doi:10.1163/1574-9347_bnp_e310710.
- Pritchard, Telfryn (1995). "The Collatio Alexandri et Dindimi: A Revised Text". Classica et Mediaevalia. 46: 255–283.
- Pucci, Joseph, ed. (2024). The Poetry of Alcuin of York: A Translation with Introduction and Commentary. Routledge.
- Ross, David J. A. (1956). "A Check-list of Manuscripts of Three Alexander Texts: The Julius Valerius Epitome, the Epistola ad Aristotelem and the Collatio cum Dindimo". Scriptorium. 10 (1): 127–132.
- Ross, David J. A. (1963). Alexander Historiatus: A Guide to Medieval Illustrated Alexander Literature. The Warburg Institute, University of London.
- Steinmann, Marc (2014). "Some Remarks on the Manuscripts of the Collatio Alexandri et Dindimi: Addenda and Corrigenda to Ross's Check-list of Alexander Texts". Scriptorium. 68 (1): 102–110.
- Steinmann, Marc (2015). "Eine fiktive Depesche der Gymnosophisten an Alexander den Großen: die Epistula Bragmanorum ad Alexandrum als Einleitung zu einer moralisch-ethnographischen Epitome". Classica et Mediaevalia. 66: 221–242.
- Steinmann, Marc (2017). "Further Remarks on the Manuscripts of the Collatio Alexandri et Dindimi: Some More Addenda to Ross's Check-list of Alexander Texts". Scriptorium. 71 (1): 124–127.
- Stoneman, Richard (2008). Alexander the Great: A Life in Legend. Yale University Press.
- Stoneman, Richard (2012) [1994]. Legends of Alexander the Great. I. B. Tauris.
- Voorbij, Johannes Benedictus (1984). "Additions to Ross's Check-list of Alexander Texts". Scriptorium. 38 (1): 116–120.
