= Indian tractates =

The Indian tractates are set of short ancient Greek writings about India associated with Alexander the Great. They are not authentic in terms of their supposed authors and addressees, but rather are part of the extensive legends about Alexander.

The four tractates are:

- Commonitorium Palladii, an essay on the Indians attributed to Palladius of Helenopolis
- Dindimus on the Brahmans, an essay comparing the Indians and Macedonians attributed to Arrian
- Collatio Alexandri cum Dindimo per litteras facta, correspondence between Alexander and the Indian king Dindimus
- Epistola Alexandri ad Aristotelem, a letter from Alexander to Aristotle on the marvels of India

All four were interpolated at some point into the Latin text of the Alexander Romance. The earliest manuscript with a version of the Romance including all of the Indian tractates is in Bamberg, Staatsbibliothek, Msc.Hist.3 (olim E.III.14) of the 10th century. Unconnected with Alexander but also fictitious is the Letter of Pharasmanes to Hadrian, which describes the marvels of the East. It was also used as a basis for augmenting the Romance.

== Works cited ==
- Cary, George (1956). The Medieval Alexander. Cambridge University Press.
- Hahn, Thomas (1978). "The Indian Tradition in Western Medieval Intellectual History". Viator. 9: 213–234. doi:10.1484/J.VIATOR.2.301547.
- Magoun, Francis Peabody, ed. (1929). The Gests of King Alexander of Macedon: Two Middle-English Alliterative Fragments, Alexander A and Alexander B. Harvard University Press.
