= Alexander and Dindimus (poem) =

The first illustration of Alexander and Dindimus. The caption (unpictured, at the bottom of the left column) reads: How Alixandre remewid to a flod þat is called Phison

Alexander and Dindimus (or the Alexander B) is a Middle English alliterative verse adaptation of the Latin Collatio Alexandri et Dindimi, the fictional correspondence of the Macedonian king Alexander the Great and the Indian king Dandamis. The version of the Collatio on which it is based was embedded in the longer romance called Historia de preliis. The poem was written in the period 1340–1370.

Alexander and Dindimus is preserved in a single illuminated manuscript, now Oxford, Bodleian Library, Bodley 264, where it is accompanied by nine miniatures with rubricated captions. The surviving text is fragmentary. It is inserted in the middle of the Roman d'Alisandre after a note in English explaining that the text was missing. In fact, the Roman did not have the account of Alexander and Dindimus' correspondence.

Alexander and Dindimus has been edited four times.

== Bibliography ==
- Cary, George (1956). The Medieval Alexander. Cambridge University Press.
- Hahn, Thomas (1978). "The Indian Tradition in Western Medieval Intellectual History". Viator. 9: 213–234. doi:10.1484/J.VIATOR.2.301547.
- Khalaf, Omar, ed. (2017). Alexander and Dindimus: Edited from Oxford, Bodleian Library, MS Bodley 264. Universitätsverlag Winter.
- Magoun, Francis Peabody, ed. (1929). The Gests of King Alexander of Macedon: Two Middle-English Alliterative Fragments, Alexander A and Alexander B. Harvard University Press.
- Ruthenbürger, Carolina (2019). "Review of Khalaf 2017". Anglia. 137 (3): 498–501. doi:10.1515/ang-2019-0045.
- Ruthenbürger, Carolina (2026). "New Light on the Source of the Middle English Alexander and Dindimus (Alexander B)". Notes and Queries. 73 (1): 19–24. doi:10.1093/notesj/gjaf140.
- Ross, David J. A. (1963). Alexander Historiatus: A Guide to Medieval Illustrated Alexander Literature. The Warburg Institute, University of London.
- Skeat, Walter W., ed. (1878). The Alliterative Romance of Alexander and Dindimus. Early English Text Society.
- Stevenson, Joseph, ed. (1849). The Alliterative Romance of Alexander. Roxburghe Club.
