= Epistula Bragmanorum ad Alexandrum =

Short Latin text

Brahmins in simple dress living in a cave in a partially-damaged illustration from a medieval bestiary that incorporated the Epistula

The Epistula Bragmanorum ad Alexandrum ('Letter of the Brahmins to Alexander') is a short Latin text that presents itself as a letter sent by the Brahmins of India to Alexander the Great in order to persuade him not to conquer their island. It was actually composed no earlier than the middle of the 5th century AD, since it borrows some words from the Correspondence of Alexander and Dindimus, a series of five fictional letters between Alexander and Dindimus, king of the Brahmins, which was written earlier in the century.

== Synopsis ==
The Epistula consists of a title, a short introduction, the letter itself and a short conclusion—three short paragraphs in the critical edition. A few manuscript omit the title.

Alexander is said to be "scouring the farthest coast of the Ocean" intending to conquer the island of the Brahmins. They send him a letter, the purpose of which becomes clear from its contents. They have heard of Alexander's victories. "But what will suffice the man for whom the whole world is not enough?" The Brahmins have no riches or luxuries. In one version they are said to hold all the goods in common. They live in caves, where they also bury their dead. Their women do nothing to enhance their natural beauty. Finally, they "have a king not for the preservation of justice, but of nobility", since their is no injustice among them.

"Struck by these words", Alexander concludes that it would not be a worthy victory to conquer them. Some versions add that "innocence is not easily overcome and the truth which is firmly based upon its own strength triumphs over malice however armed."

== Sources ==
Although the manuscript tradition of the Epistula is late, its details are typical of the late antique flowering of Alexander literature. According to Thomas Hahn, the Epistula is based on the Commonitorium Palladii. According to Chiara Di Serio, it is a reworking of material from the Correspondence. According to Marc Steinmann, it may have been intended from the beginning to serve as an introduction to the Correspondence.

== Analysis ==
The Epistula is unique among Latin texts of Alexander legends that it places the Brahmins on an island, a localization otherwise found only in Byzantine texts, namely, the ε recension of the Alexander Romance, George Hamartolos and the Suda. Historically, Alexander the Great encountered the Brahmins near Taxila. Their transfer in legend from the Punjab to an island in the ocean may result reflect the influence of the legendary Isles of the Blessed or conflation of the Brahmin homeland with the island of Taprobane (Sri Lanka), since both are mentioned in the Commonitorium.

Steinmann notes that the final remark of the Brahmins, that they have a king, undercuts their argument by ostensibly giving Alexander an equal to defeat. He suggests that it may be a change from the original closing of the letter. John of Salisbury quote the Epistula for the fact that the Brahmins have a king without having need of one. The king's fuction is to preserve a people nobility in a sense that "is not political but moral, that is to preserve the integrity of their customs".

The Epistula was influential out of proportion to its length. In the 16th century, it seems to have influenced Thomas More in writing his Utopia.

== Manuscripts ==
The textual history of the Epistula "remains to be written". It could have been written as early as the 5th century or several centuries later. The earliest attestation of the Epistula is by John of Salisbury, who quotes it in his Policraticus in 1159. It has even been suggested that John composed it. Five other authors also quote it: Gilbert of Tournai, Eruditio regum et principum; Vincent of Beauvais, Speculum historiale; Bonaventure, Sermones de tempore; Ranulph Higden, Polychronicon; and the anonymous Eulogium historiarum sive temporis (c. 1366).

In the manuscripts, the Epistula almost always precedes an epitome of the Correspondence and serves as an introduction. It never appears with the unabridged Correspondence and is transmitted as a standalone text in only one known manuscript. Vincent, Ranulph and the Eulogium also quote the epitome of the Correspondence. Steinmann has published a critical edition based on the six authors who quote it and the following twelve manuscripts:

- Brussels, Royal Library of Belgium, MS II.2294 (15th century), folio 199v
- Cambridge, Gonville and Caius College, MS 154 (12th–13th century), pp. 137–138 – the only manuscript to preserve the Epistula as a standalone text
- Cambridge, Corpus Christi College, MS 450 (13th–14th century), folio 141r
- Cambridge, University Library, MS Kk.4.25 (c. 1230), folio 52v (fragment 49) – fragmentary but illustrated text in a bestiary of the third family
- Giessen, Universitätsbibliothek, MS 1256 (15th century), folio 232v
- Ithaca, Cornell University Library, Rare Bd. MS. 4648 no. 31+ (c. 1450), folio 141v
- London, British Library, MS Royal 6 E III (15th century), folio 111v
- London, British Library, MS Royal 7 A I (15th century), folio 108v
- London, British Library, MS Royal Add. 40676 (16th century), folio 2v
- Marburg, Universitätsbibliothek, MS 9 (14th century), folio 156v
- Oxford, Bodleian Library, MS Canon. Pat. Lat. 43 (15th century), folio 95v
- Vienna, Austrian National Library, MS 3164 (15th century), folio 214v

Across these manuscripts, there are two main versions of the text, α and β. In the β version, the end of the Epistula is removed to allow a seamless transition to the epitome of the Correspondence. There is also a highly divergent version found in Oxford, Bodleian Library, MS Douce 299, which Steinmann excluded from his edition. Di Serio provides the text of the Policraticus and a translation. Lellia Ruggini published a diplomatic edition of the text from the Vienna manuscript in 1961, but her intended critical edition of the text never appeared.

The influence of the Epistula can be seen in Jacobus de Cessolis and the Travels of Sir John Mandeville.

== Bibliography ==
- Cary, George (1956). The Medieval Alexander. Cambridge University Press.
- Crisma, Luca (2020). "Ubi nulla fit iniustitia: le royaume des Brahmanes dans le Policraticus de Jean de Salisbury". Cahiers de civilisation médiévale (250–251): 105–124.
- Di Serio, Chiara (2021). "The Brahmans' Utopia from the Greek Sources to John of Salisbury's Policraticus" (PDF). Gremium. 15: 97–113.
- Hahn, Thomas (1980). "Notes on Ross's Check-list of Alexander Texts". Scriptorium. 34 (2): 275–278.
- Ruggini, Lellia (1961). "L'Epitoma rerum gestarum Alexandri Magni e il Liber de morte testamentoque eius". Athenaeum. 39: 285–357.
- Steinmann, Marc (2015). "Eine fiktive Depesche der Gymnosophisten an Alexander den Großen: die Epistula Bragmanorum ad Alexandrum als Einleitung zu einer moralisch-ethnographischen Epitome". Classica et Mediaevalia. 66: 221–242.
- Steinmann, Marc (2017). "Further Remarks on the Manuscripts of the Collatio Alexandri et Dindimi: Some More Addenda to Ross's Check-list of Alexander Texts". Scriptorium. 71 (1): 124–127.
