= Grace Smith =

Grace Smith may refer to:

- Grace Partridge Smith (1869–1959), American educator
- Grace Cossington Smith (1892–1984), Australian artist

== See also ==
- Briar Grace-Smith, New Zealand screenwriter, director, actor, and short story writer
