= Names of the Maldives =

Maldives has been known by many different names during its long history of more than two thousand years. Although several different names are given, the location and the description of the islands confirm the fact that they are part of the Maldives Archipelago.

In ancient times Malé was also called Mahal, considered to be the origin of Mahal Dvipa or Maléldvip. Throughout known history, Malé or Mahal was always the most important island, the island where the king resided. It is therefore a logical assumption that the name given to the islands, Mahal Dvipa, contained a reference to the chief island of Mahal.. A study of the names shows that in the 9th, 10th and 11th centuries, the original Mahal Dvipa became Arabicised by Middle Eastern travellers, to Mahaldib, and later became Anglicised by the British Empire to emerge in its present form of Maldives. However, throughout history the Maldivians have used the name Dhivehi Raajje to refer to their country, meaning 'the country of the Dhivehi people'.

== List ==
Given below are some of the names by which Maldives was known through the centuries.

- In the early fifth century AD, Palladius, Bishop of Hellenopolis (AD 360–430), a classical Greek bishop, refers to Maldives as Maniolae, in his treatise On the Races of India and the Brahmans, adding that the magnet stone which attracts iron was produced in these islands.
- One of the first known references to Maldives is given in the Mahavamsa (5th century), the ancient chronicle of the people of Sri Lanka. In these records Maldives is referred to as Mahinda-dvipa.
- In ancient South Indian Pallava dynasty inscriptions of the 7th century AD, Maldives was called Dvipa Laksham 'a hundred thousand islands'.
- Hiuen-Tsang, a Buddhist monk who travelled in India for religious studies in the years AD 629 to 645, was the first Chinese writer to mention Maldives. He called the islands Na-lo-ki-lo-chou 'coconut islands'.
- A Chinese document from the Tang dynasty records the visit of Maldivians to China, bringing with them gifts from their king, Baladitiya, in AD 658 and also in AD 662. Maldives is referred to as Mo-lai in this document.
- In a 10th-century Tamil record of the Chola dynasty, Maldives is given the name Munnir Palantivu Pannirayiram 'twelve thousand islands and the ocean where three waters meet'.
- Sulaiman was a Persian merchant and sea-captain who lived in the first half of the ninth century AD. His manuscripts describing his travels and the places he visited were found in France in the 1700s. In his description of Maldives, he gives it the name Dibajat. Al-Biruni in the 11th century and Muhammad al-Idrisi in the 12th century AD also referred to Maldives by the name of Dibajat.
- Abu Zayd, who lived in Iraq in the years AD 850 to 934, writes of Maldives as Dyvah Kouzah 'cowrie islands'.
- In the Tamil commentary Tolkattiyam of the 13th century AD, Maldives is called Palpalamtivu 'many old islands'.
- The Chinese writer Wang Ta-Yuan, writing in 1349, gave Maldives the name Pei Liu. In AD 1414, Zheng He, the famous Chinese commander, came to Maldives, bringing with him a scribe by the name of Ma Huan to record their travels. In Ma Huan's records, Maldives is called Lu Shan Tieh-kan (陆山) 'the countries of the island mountains'. In AD 1436, the Chinese writer Fei Hsin called the islands Lu Shan Yang 'atolls of the Maldives'.
- The 13th-century Kudahuvadhoo Loamaafaanu gives the name of Maldives as Panandheepu. The Bodugalu Miskiiy Loamaafaanu gives the same name as Fanandheebu.
- Ibn Battuta, who visited Maldives in 1343 and stayed for 18 months, and returned in AD 1346, called the islands by the name Dhibat al-Mahal.
- When the first Portuguese arrived in the East in the early 16th century, Maldives was referred to by them as Ilha Dywe.
- In AD 1573, when Muhammad Thakurufaanu Al-Azam became sultan after the defeat of the Portuguese occupants, he Arabised the official name to Al Daulat min al-Mahaldibiyat.
- In the late 18th and early 19th centuries, Maldives was called Maldiva Islands in many English records, but by the beginning of the 20th century, Maldives or Maldive Islands had become the commonly used name.

== See also ==
- History of Maldives
