= John Gregory (scholar) =

English orientalist

John Gregory (10 November 1607 – 13 March 1646/47), also written John Gregorie, was an English orientalist.

== Life ==
He was born at Amersham, Buckinghamshire, on 10 November 1607, and was from a humble background. He became a servitor of Christ Church, Oxford, in 1624, being placed along with his ‘master,’ Sir William Drake of Amersham, under the tuition of George Morley, afterwards bishop of Winchester. For several years he spent sixteen hours a day in study. His only teacher was John Dod, who directed his Hebrew studies during one vacation at his benefice in Northamptonshire. After graduating B.A. 11 October 1628, and M.A. 22 June 1631, he took holy orders. Brian Duppa, then dean of Christ Church, made him chaplain of the cathedral, and, on becoming a bishop, his own domestic chaplain.

The First English Civil War deprived him of patron and stipend. He retired to an alehouse at Kidlington, near Oxford. There he died on 13 March 1646; his remains were carried to Oxford and buried on the left side of the grave of William Cartwright, in the aisle adjoining the south side of the choir of Christ Church Cathedral. Anthony Wood called Gregory "the miracle of his age for critical and curious learning".

== Works ==
Collected editions of his writings were:

- Gregorii Posthuma : or certain learned Tracts: written by John Gregorie. … Together with a short Account of the Author's Life; and Elegies on his much-lamented Death, published by his friend John Gurgany, London, 1649. Some copies bear the date 1650 on the title-page. There are eight separate tracts, each with a separate title-page, but the whole is continuously paged. One of them, entitled "Discours declaring what time the Nicene Creed began to bee sung in the Church," contains a brief notice of early organs. The dedication states that Sir Edward Bysshe had been a patron of Gregory and Gurgany.
- Gregorii Opuscula : or, Notes & Observations upon some Passages of Scripture, with other learned Tracts; the second edition (‘Gregorii Posthuma,’ &c.), London, 1650.
- Works, in two parts, include the preceding, London, 1665; another edition, 2 pts. London, 1671; 4th edition, 2 pts. London, 1684–83.

Two of his treatises were published separately:

- Notes on Sir Thomas Ridley's "View of the Civile and Ecclesiasticall Law". The second edition, by J. G[regory], Oxford, 1634; other editions were issued in 1662, 1675, and 1676. (Ridley's work was published in 1607).
- Notes and Observations upon some Passages of Scripture. By I. G., &c., Oxford, 1646, inscribed to Bishop Duppa. It was translated into Latin by Richard Stokes and inserted in Bishop Pearson's Critici Sacri.

Gregory assisted Augustine Lindsell in preparing an edition of Theophylacti in D. Pauli Epistolas Commentarii, 1636.

He left in manuscript:

- "Observationes in Loca quædam excerpta ex Joh. Malalæ Chronographia" (which Wood stated to be in the Oxford Public Library)
- "Al-Kibla", a treatise on adoration towards the east, which went to the Bodleian Library.

Gregory also translated from Greek into Latin:

- Palladius, 'De Gentibus Indiæ et Brachmanibus.'
- S. Ambrosius, 'De Moribus Brachmanorum.'
- Anonymous, 'De Brachmanibus.'

These translations passed after his death to Edmund Chilmead, and subsequently to Sir Edward Bysshe, who published them under his own name in 1665.
