= Alexander Haggerty Krappe =

American folklorist (1894-1947)

- Born: July 11, 1894; Boston, Massachusetts, U.S.
- Died: November 30, 1947 (aged 53); Princeton, New Jersey, U.S.
- Education: University of Berlin; University of Iowa; University of Chicago
- Occupation: Translator
- Relatives: Grace Partridge Smith (mother-in-law)
- Writing career
- Genre: Folklore

Alexander Haggerty Krappe (July 6, 1894 – November 30, 1947) was a folklorist and writer. Along with Francis Peabody Magoun, he was the first translator of folktales collected by the Brothers Grimm into the English language. He was also a linguist, teacher, translator of scientific and other materials, a Roman philologist, a comparative mythologist, a classicist, and a Scandinavianist.

Despite his contributions and academic writing, his work has been overlooked in the modern Folklore discipline as he staunchly denied the existence of American Folklore.

== Biography ==
Alexander Haggerty Krappe was born in Boston, Massachusetts, in 1894. His childhood was said to be unhappy, and after his parents divorced, he was taken back to Europe by his German-born father. Krappe received his education in the Leibniz und Siemen's Oberealschuel in Charlottenberg, Berlin. An accomplished student, he remained at the university until 1915 upon his decision to study modern languages. Thus Krappe spent 1915-1916 studying medieval history and Romance languages at the University of Berlin.

Krappe went on to enter the University of Iowa in Iowa City on a graduate fellowship, and received his M.A. with a major in French and a minor in Italian. The capstone of his M.A., his thesis was entitled "The Chronology of the old French Chanson de Geste." In January 1918, he began doctoral work at the University of Chicago on another graduate fellowship. In 1919, Krappe received a Ph.D. His work in university established his interest in epic and medieval literature.

In 1919, Krappe married Edith Smith, the daughter of folklorist Grace Partridge Smith. Edith would go on to describe her husband as "brilliant, but deeply troubled and enigmatic man when all of the sources are combined, it is the picture that emerges."

Krappe died on November 30, 1947, in Iowa City, Iowa, leaving three book-length manuscripts. The most significant of these, and only one published, was a translation of Grimm's Collected Fairy Tales in conjunction with Francis Peabody Magoun.

== Definitions ==
In his book The Science of Folklore he stated:

Folklore is a historical science, having its own methods of research and admitting of the same system of checks and verifications as any other. With its sister sciences it may combine to make up the cycle of our knowledge of man's past life. From this follows that it may assume the rank of an ancillary science to any or all of them, and it has done so repeatedly, notably to the various philogies, history, ethnography, and the history of religion.

Krappe's work also extended into the field of folksong, with his own scholarly definition:

The folksong is a song, i.e a lyric poem with melody, which originated anonymously, among unlettered folk in times past and which remained in currency for a considerable time, as a rule for centuries . . . The American Kentucky Home, though it is supposed to have originated in circle of a somewhat darker hue than is popular in certain sections of the country, is a genuine folksong of both colored and white people

This also serves as a prime example of Krappe's unpopularity among Folklorists and anthropologists, as Krappe's work many times shows him to be racist and sexist.

== Works ==
- The Ploughman King: a comparative study in literature and folklore, 1919
- Alliteration in the Chanson de Roland and in the Carmen de Prodicione Guenonis, 1921
- The Legend of Roderick, Last of the Visigoth Kings, and the Ermanarich Cycle, 1923
- Krappe, A.H. (1930), "The Science of Folk-lore", Nature, 126 (3182): 644, Bibcode:1930Natur.126Q.644., doi:10.1038/126644b0
- Hispanic Notes & Monotitle = Hispanic Notes & Monographs; Essays, Studies, and Brief Biographies Issued by the Hispanic Society of America, 1930
- Balor with the Evil Eye. Studies in Celtic and French Literature, 1927

== Obituary ==
- Taylor, Archer (April–June 1948), "Alexander Haggerty Krappe (1894-1947)", Journal of American Folklore (obituary), 61 (240): 201–202
