= Grace Partridge Smith =

American folklorist (1869–1959)

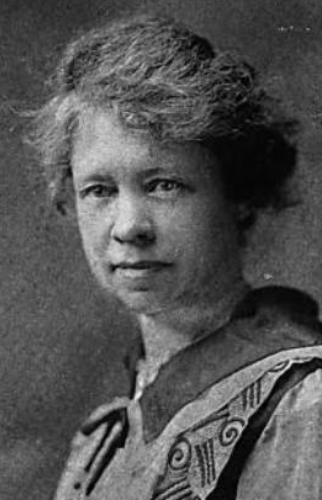
- Grace Partridge Smith, from the 1924 yearbook of the University of Iowa
- Born: Grace Otis Partridge; April 24, 1869; Templeton, Massachusetts
- Died: May 3, 1959 (age 90); Anna, Illinois
- Occupation: Folklorist
- Relatives: Alexander Haggerty Krappe (son-in-law)

Grace Otis Partridge Smith (April 24, 1869 – May 3, 1959) was an American folklorist and educator. She studied American regional folk cultures, especially that of "Egypt", a local nickname of Southern Illinois.

== Early life and education ==
Partridge was born in Templeton, Massachusetts, the daughter of James Otis Partridge and Arvilla Pauline Kimball Partridge. She graduated from the University of Iowa in 1891, and earned a master's degree in German and Greek in 1921, with a thesis titled "The Characteristics of the Dorfnovelle". She was a member of Phi Beta Kappa. She also studied piano at the conservatory in Leipzig.

== Career ==
Smith taught Greek at the University of Iowa, and held various other positions, while her husband was a mathematics professor there. She was editor of The Iowa Alumnus magazine in the 1920s. She retired from the University of Iowa in 1938, and in her later years studied the American regional stories, language, and songs, especially the distinct folklore of southern Illinois, known as "Egypt" locally and in many of her publications. In 1946, she was a founder and the first president of the Illinois Folklore Society.

== Publications ==
Smith's folklore studies were published in scholarly journals including Folklore, The Journal of American Folklore, American Speech, Midwest Folklore, Wisconsin Magazine of History, Journal of the Illinois State Historical Society, Southern Folklore Quarterly, and Names. She also contributed dozens of entries to Funk & Wagnalls' Standard Dictionary of Folklore, Mythology, and Legend (1949–1950).

- "Movies Now a Vital Force in University Education" (1922)
- "An Anecdote from Hampshire" (1938)
- "A Vermont Variant of 'The Frog's Courting'" (1939)
- "Folklore from 'Egypt'" (1941)
- "Speech Currents in 'Egypt'" (1942)
- "A Glimpse of Early Merrimack" (1945)
- "Wayland Female Institute (Alton, 1853-1856)" (1945)
- "Four Irish Ballads from 'Egypt'" (1946)
- "Jack-Stones Again" (1949)
- "Egyptian 'Lies'" (1951)
- "Heard in the Illinois Ozarks" (1951)
- "Negro Lore in Southern Illinois" (1952)
- "If All The World Were …" (1954)
- "They Call it Egypt" (1954)
- "More Lincoln Lore" (1954)

== Personal life ==
Partridge married mathematics professor Arthur George Smith in 1896. The Smiths had three daughters: Edith, Ilse and Edna. Ilse and Edna were twins; Edna died at age 2 in 1906. Grace Partridge Smith's husband, Arthur George Smith, died of Leukemia in 1916. Her daughter Edith married folklorist and translator Alexander Haggerty Krappe. Smith died in 1959, at the age of 90, in Anna, Illinois.
