= On the Races of India and the Brahmans =

Greek treatise on India attributed to Palladius of Helenopolis

Alexander the Great meets the Brahmans and asks them who their leader is, illustration from the Trebizond Alexander Romance

On the Races of India and the Brahmans (Greek: Περὶ τῶν τῆς Ἰνδίας ἐθνῶν καὶ τῶν Βραγμάνων; Latin: De gentibus Indiae et Bragmanibus) is a Greek treatise on India attributed to Palladius of Helenopolis. It consists of two parts. In the first, the author relates information about India drawn from many sources including the account of a traveller he knew. In the second, the author quotes a text attributed to Arrian of Nicomedia, which itself contains a long dialogue between Alexander the Great and the Indian sage Dandamis. The attribution of both parts is disputed. The first part is often known as the Commonitorium Palladii, a title sometimes applied to the work as a whole. The second part is sometimes known as Dindimus de Bragmanibus.

== Synopsis ==
On the Races of India and the Brahmans is divided into two parts and subdivided into short chapters or paragraphs. There are 15 in the first part and 57 in the second. The text is usually cited by part and paragraph (e.g., 1.2 or 2.39).

=== Part 1 – Commonitorium Palladii ===
The treatise is addressed to an unnamed person with philosophic interests. Its topic is the Brahmans who live "on the borders of India and China, on the banks of the Ganges", which is identified with the biblical Pishon. The author does not claim firsthand knowledge, only to have "visited the near extremities of India ... a few years ago" with Moses, bishop of Adulis. He notes that Alexander, too, did not cross the Ganges but got as far as Serica, where he erected a pillar.

The author claims to have gotten his information about the Brahmans "from a certain Theban scholar" (scholastikos, 'man of law'). The Theban visited Adulis and Axum in the company of an older man. He desired to visit Taprobane, the island where "the so-called Long-livers" and "the great king of the Indians" dwell, but was unable to do so. Taprobane is one of around a thousand islands called the Manioloi, where natural magnet is abundant and ships must be made with wooden pegs rather than iron nails.

The Theban fell in with some Indian merchants at Axum and went with them back to India, but, when he tried to enter the country of the Bedsades, he was arrested. Although he could not speak the language, he was put on trial and convicted. During his six years of captivity, he was put to work in a bakery and learned the language. The Theban describes how he was freed:

I obtained my release in the following way. Another king was making war with the one who held me prisoner, and he informed on him to the great king, the one who has his seat in the island of Taprobane: he told the great king that this king was holding a distinguished Roman prisoner and forcing him to ignominious labour. The great king then sent one of his judges to investigate, and on discovering the truth ordered him to be flayed alive for abusing a Roman citizen. They are, you see, very afraid and respectful of the power of Rome, believing that Rome could easily conquer their country because of its superior strength in men and engines of war.

The author then relates what the Theban told him about the lifestyle of the Brahmans. They are set apart by God and live in forests on the banks of the Ganges, the men on the far side, the women on the nearer (Indian) side. They are habitually naked. They neither farm the ground nor rear animals. They have no metallurgy, no fire, no alcohol and no houses. They lie on nests of leaves. They do not bake bread but eat only wild plants. They pray looking up at the sky. Of their religion, he says: "They reverence God and have some slight knowledge of him, and although they are unable to analyse the ways of Providence in a sophisticated manner, they nevertheless pray unceasingly."

The Brahmans have unusual sexual practices. The men cross over in July–August to have intercourse with their wives for forty days. After two children are born, the men practice abstinence and send substitutes to pleasure their wives. If a woman does not conceive after five years, the man ceases trying. "As a result, that race is not very numerous". Their land is full of elephants and dangerous creatures, including river monsters like the Odontotyrannus, which can swallow an elephant, and a type of giant snake, the skin of which the Theban claims to have seen.

=== Part 2 – Dindimus de Bragmanibus ===
Onesicritus finds Dandamis

Alexander and companions go to visit Dandamis

Alexander takes his leave, along with his gifts

For purposes of edification, the author of the treatise appends what he calls "a little work I have acquired by Arrian, the student of the philosopher Epictetus ... and historian of Alexander". The excerpt begins by quoting Dandamis. He describes Alexander as spreading false rumours of his divine birth. Having learned about the Brahmans from Kalanos, Alexander came to India to learn from them. There follows a dialogue between Alexander and the Brahmans, which the latter open by denouncing Kalanos for his greed. They denounce wealth—"the enemy of the soul"—and war, for "there is no manliness in killing men".

True manliness consists in fighting the changes of climate with the naked body, removing the lusts of the belly and conquering the warfare within, rather than being overcome by desire and the search for glory, wealth and pleasure. These, Alexander, are what you must first conquer, these you must kill. If you conquer these, you will have no need to fight against external foes. The purpose of fighting external foes is only to bring tribute to these internal desires. Do you not see that you conquer your external foes but are conquered by the internal ones? How many kings of foolishness do you think rule over fools? Sight, hearing, smell, taste, touch, tongue, stomach, genitals, the entire flesh of your body. There are many of them within, like implacable mistresses and insatiable tyrants, making endless demands; desires, avarice, love of pleasure, murder, assassination, meanness, dispute: to all of these and more men are enslaved, for these they kill and are killed.

Having won the inner battle, the Brahmans enjoy the outer world—in nudity and silence. They denounce the lifestyle of the Macedonians for its greed, gluttony and addiction to finery. The desire for gold comes in for extended criticism: "Every human desire ceases when it is satisfied, because this is inherent in nature. But the desire for wealth knows no satiety, because it is against nature." When Alexander asks to see the Brahmans' leader, he is directed to Dandamis, but cannot find him. Alexander then sends Onesicritus, who locates the sage and gives him an ultimatum: come to Alexander and receive riches or be killed. Dandamis, however, mocks Alexander's claim to be lord of all men:

God, the great king, is the source of no violence, but of light, peace, life, water, and of the human body and soul; and he receives the souls that have not been conquered by desire, when fate releases them. This is my only lord and god, who sets his face against murder and does not take part in warfare. Alexander is no god, for he knows that he must die. How can he be lord of all men, when he has not yet crossed the Tiberoboam or the Cossoalus, when he has not set up his throne in Palibothra, when he has not passed Zonenades, nor seen the course of the sun either in Mesopotamia, or in the Borderlands or the Karisoborioi. Scythia has not yet learnt his name. If the land over there is not enough for him, let him cross the Ganges and he will find a land capable of bearing men, if the land over there is no longer able to hold him.

Dandamis answers Onesicritus that Alexander must come to him. Impressed, Alexander takes fifteen friends and visits Dandamis in his forest. He asks for wisdom. There follows an extended discourse on wisdom which is highly critical of Alexander for his conquests. Because his "soul is full of unfulfilled desires, insatiable avarice and superstitious love of power", Alexander has "no room ... to accommodate the gift of God" that Dandamis could share with him. Dandamis warns him that he cannot escape the judgement of the all-seeing God and is guilty of destroying what God creates. Dandamis nevertheless encourages him to abandon all his wealth and conquests, his lifetyle and his Macedonians and come live as a Brahman. This section includes a strong rebuke of eating meat. Dandamis says, "I do not become a grave of dead animals."

Learn this piece of wisdom from me, Alexander: desire nothing, and everything will be yours, and you will lack nothing. Desire is the mother of penury; penury is the result of indiscipline treated with bad medicines. It is miserable because it never finds what it seeks, is never content with what it has, but is tortured with lust for what it does not have.

Imagining Alexander in posthumous torment, Dandamis derides his epithet "the Great", since "he who set out to conquer the world will be conquered at last." Arrian (or whoever wrote the treatise attributed to him) notes that Alexander was not angry with Dandamis because he had a divine spark in himself that was only perverted by an evil demon into conquering the world. Alexander responds and tries to give Dandamis gifts, but they are rejected save for the oil, which Dandamis immediately burns up in a bonfire.

The treatise attributed to Arrian ends with a second long discourse by Dandamis on the wisdom and lifestyle of the Brahmans. Dandamis believes "we shall give an account of our lives to God when we depart to meet him". The Macedonians are again condemned as slaves to their desires who cannot give orders to the truly free. Vegetarianism is reaffirmed even more strongly and all use of domestic animals is condemned, including, e.g., raising sheep for wool. Hunting and fishing are also condemned. Dandamis launches an attack on alcohol and gluttony as severe as that on meat-eating. Greek philosophy is also attacked. The Epicureans are condemned for effeminacy and artificiality, while the Stoics are blasted as greedy. The Greeks are also condemned for creating eunuchs.

== Authorship and authenticity ==
On the Races of India and the Brahmans is attributed to a certain Palladius, usually identified with Bishop Palladius of Helenopolis (died 431), the author of the Lausiac History. In manuscript π, the attribution is to Palladius, bishop of Cappadocia. The Lausiac History and On the Races appear together in several manuscripts. The attribution to Palladius of Helenopolis is widely accepted. When it is not, the author may be known as Pseudo-Palladius.

The author of On the Races introduces the latter part of his treatise as a work of Arrian of Nicomedia (fl. 89–145), the historian who wrote the Anabasis of Alexander and the Indica. Scholars agree that it is an originally separate work that is older than the first part. The author, however, does not supply a title. He introduces Arrian by reference to his teacher, Epictetus, which is unusual, and adds that Epictetus lived during the reign of Nero, who put to death the apostles Peter and Paul. J. D. M. Derrett suggests that the original title may have contained a reference to Epictetus. The references to Peter and Paul and to the Brahmans' incomplete grasp of Providence indicate that the author was a Christian, which supports the attribution to Palladius of Helenopolis.

In his Anabasis, Arrian promises to write a work on the Brahmans, which Richard Stoneman argues is unlikely to be the work in question. Derrett argues that the work is more likely a product of Arrian's student period under Epictetus than a mature work. Several authors have questioned whether the tract attributed to Arrian is not in fact the work of Palladius or the author of the first part because of certain Christian characteristics, including similarities with the writings of Palladius' teacher, Evagrius of Pontus.

== Sources ==
Whether or not Part 2 is a work of Arrian himself or derived from such a work, it is related to the fragmentary text on Geneva Papyrus 271, which dates to the mid-2nd century AD. This text is a diatribe of Cynic origin and could date to as early as the 2nd century BC. Derrett argues that the papyrus preserves the work of Arrian, but this is unlikely. In any case, the papyrus and Part 2 of On the Races show "remarkable verbal similarity".

At 2.39, Dandamis sings a hymn:

Immortal God, I thank you for all things. You alone are the true ruler of all things, and your creation provides abundance of all nourishment. You created this universe, you watch over and wait for the souls you have sent here, so that you may give honour like a god to those who live properly, and hand over to the judgement those who disobey your commandments. All right judgement is in your hands, and eternal life is prepared beside you; in your everlasting goodness you have mercy on everyone.

This hymn seems to be of Christian origin.

== Textual history ==
On the Races of India and the Brahmans has a "complex and confusing history". It was edited several times, resulting in different versions. It was interpolated into Pseudo-Callisthenes' Alexander Romance and translated more than once into Latin and thence into European vernaculars.

The manuscripts of On the Races are known by sigla, conventionally a mixture upper-case Latin letters and lower-case Greek letters. The original version of the text by (or attributed to) Palladius was embellished twice to produce two versions:

- Versio Augmentata, which does not survive as such but was the source for a collection of excerpts known as the Excerpta Palladii, which survives in five manuscripts, known as K, R, ν, ι and ο
- Versio Ornatior, also called recension Θ, which survives in only two Greek manuscripts, Q and Z, but which was twice translated into Latin (the translation attributed to Ambrose of Milan found in manuscripts S, T, W and V, the other in B); epitomized as the Summarium Palladii (found in one manuscript, F); and also embellished further to produce the Versio Ornatior et Interpolata, also called recension Σ (found in manuscripts L, P, π, ψ, α, ε, θ and ζ), which was in turn interpolated at some stage into the Alexander Romance (found as such in manuscripts D, C, A and β)

Alexander meets Dandamis, from Morgan M.782 (Histori von dem Grossen Alexander)

Alexander meets Dandamis, from BSB Cgm 581 (Histori von dem Grossen Alexander)

Manuscript A is the only copy of redaction α of the Romance. Manuscripts D, C and β all belong to redaction γ. The position of the interpolated text varies between the redactions. The Old Serbian Alexander Romance, which is based on redaction γ, also includes the Versio Ornatior et Interpolata. Manuscript D and three Russian copies of the Old Serbian text have illustrations corresponding to On the Races.

The authenticity of the attribution to Ambrose of the more popular Latin translation is disputed. Its Latinity is of a high standard, but has been argued to be inferior to that of Ambrose. On the Races is also found in certain Latin versions of the Alexander Romance, from which it made its way into Johannes Hartlieb's German translation, Histori von dem Grossen Alexander, where it is illustrated in two manuscripts.

Stoneman's English translation is based on the Versio Ornatior.

== Publication history ==
The Greek text of On the Races of India and the Brahmans was first published by Joachim Camerarius alongside his own Latin translation in 1569. An edition by Edward Bysshe appeared in 1665, based on a Greek manuscript owned by John Gregory. This edition was intended ostensibly to inform the English public about India after Charles II had acquired Bombay through the Marriage Treaty of 1661. Gregory's manuscript is now lost. Bysshe's edition was reprinted in 1668.

Both printings of Bysshe's edition included the Latin translation attributed to Ambrose. This was first published in 1585 under the title De moribus Brachmanorum, but that edition is highly corrupt. It was part of the so-called Sixtine (or Sistine) edition of Ambrose's complete works edited by Pope Sixtus V. Its manuscript basis is unknown.

Hartlieb's Histori von dem Grossen Alexander was printed by Johannes Bämler in 1473. This incunable edition has illustrations matching those in the manuscripts.

== Bibliography ==
- Berg, Beverly (1974). "The Letter of Palladius on India". Byzantion. 44 (1): 5–16. JSTOR 44170424.
- Berghoff, Wilhelm, ed. (1967). Palladius: De gentibus Indiae et Bragmanibus. A. Hain.
- Cary, George (1954). "A Note on the Mediaeval History of the Collatio Alexandri cum Dindimo". Classica et Mediaevalia. 15: 124–129.
- Cary, George (1956). The Medieval Alexander. Cambridge University Press.
- Coleman-Norton, Paul Robinson (1926). "The Authorship of the Epistola de Indicis gentibus et de Bragmanibus". Classical Philology. 21 (2): 154–160.
- Derrett, J. Duncan M. (1960a). "The History of 'Palladius on the Races of India and the Brahmans'". Classica et Mediaevalia. 21: 64–99.
- Derrett, J. Duncan M. (1960b). "Palladius: De Vita Bragmanorum Narratio, alias Palladii de Gentibus Indiae et Bragmanibus Commonitorii necnon Arriani Opusculi Versio Ornatior". Classica et Mediaevalia. 21: 100–135.
- Di Serio, Chiara (2020). "De gentibus Indiae et Bragmanibus". Brill Encyclopedia of Early Christianity Online. Brill. doi:10.1163/2589-7993_EECO_SIM_045233.
- Hahn, Thomas (1978). "The Indian Tradition in Western Medieval Intellectual History". Viator. 9: 213–234. doi:10.1484/J.VIATOR.2.301547.
- Magoun, Francis Peabody, ed. (1929). The Gests of King Alexander of Macedon: Two Middle-English Alliterative Fragments, Alexander A and Alexander B. Harvard University Press.
- Pritchard, Roger Telfryn (1993a). "Another MS of the Alexander–Dindimus Debate: London, Lambeth Palace Library 499". Scriptorium. 47 (1): 48–52.
- Pritchard, Roger Telfryn (1993b). "The 'Ambrose' Text of Alexander and the Brahmans". Classica et Mediaevalia. 44: 109–139.
- Pritchard, Roger Telfryn (1995). "The Collatio Alexandri et Dindimi: A Revised Text". Classica et Mediaevalia. 46: 255–283.
- Ross, David J. A. (1963). Alexander Historiatus: A Guide to Medieval Illustrated Alexander Literature. The Warburg Institute, University of London.
- Stadter, Philip A. (1980). Arrian of Nicomedia. University of North Carolina Press.
- Steinmann, Marc (2014). "Some Remarks on the Manuscripts of the Collatio Alexandri et Dindimi: Addenda and Corrigenda to Ross's Check-list of Alexander Texts". Scriptorium. 68 (1): 102–110.
- Steinmann, Marc (2015). "Eine fiktive Depesche der Gymnosophisten an Alexander den Großen: die Epistula Bragmanorum ad Alexandrum als Einleitung zu einer moralisch-ethnographischen Epitome". Classica et Mediaevalia. 66: 221–242.
- Stoneman, Richard (1994). "Who are the Brahmans? Indian Lore and Cynic Doctrine in Palladius' De Bragmanibus and Its Models". The Classical Quarterly. 44: 500–510. doi:10.1017/S0009838800043950.
- Stoneman, Richard (2008). Alexander the Great: A Life in Legend. Yale University Press.
- Stoneman, Richard (2012) [1994]. Legends of Alexander the Great. I. B. Tauris.
