= Peniarth 481 =

15th-century illuminated manuscript

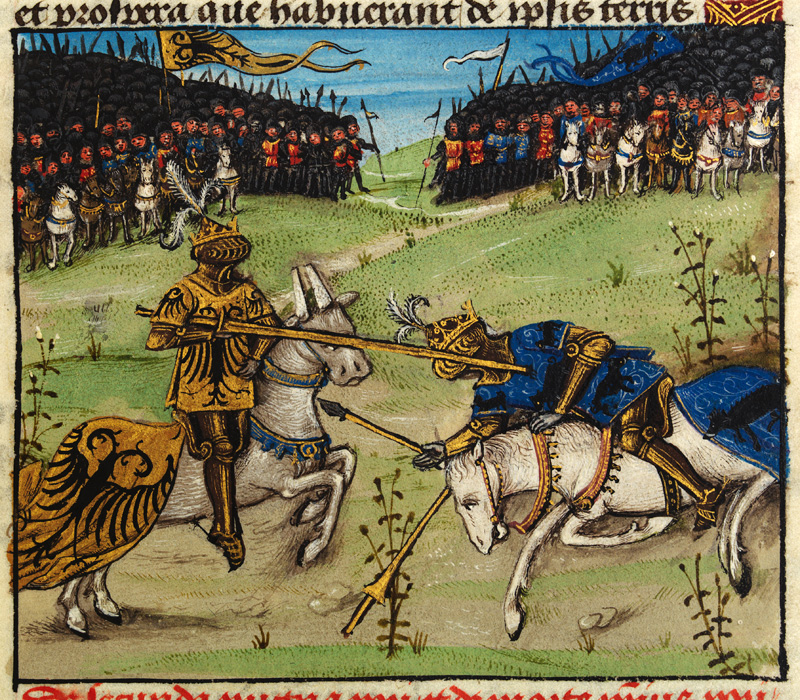
Folio 70r.: Alexander killing Porus in single combat before their armies.

Peniarth 481D is a late 15th-century illuminated manuscript in its original binding that is held at the National Library of Wales. It is also known as The Battles of Alexander the Great, a reference to the twenty-six miniatures that accompany the Latin text Historia de preliis Alexandri Magni. The volume also contains Disticha Catonis, and Historia trium Regum (History of the Three Kings). The manuscript, which is one of the most lavishly decorated in the National Library, has examples of the work of an English scribe, a Flemish illuminator and a workshop in Cologne.

== Gallery ==
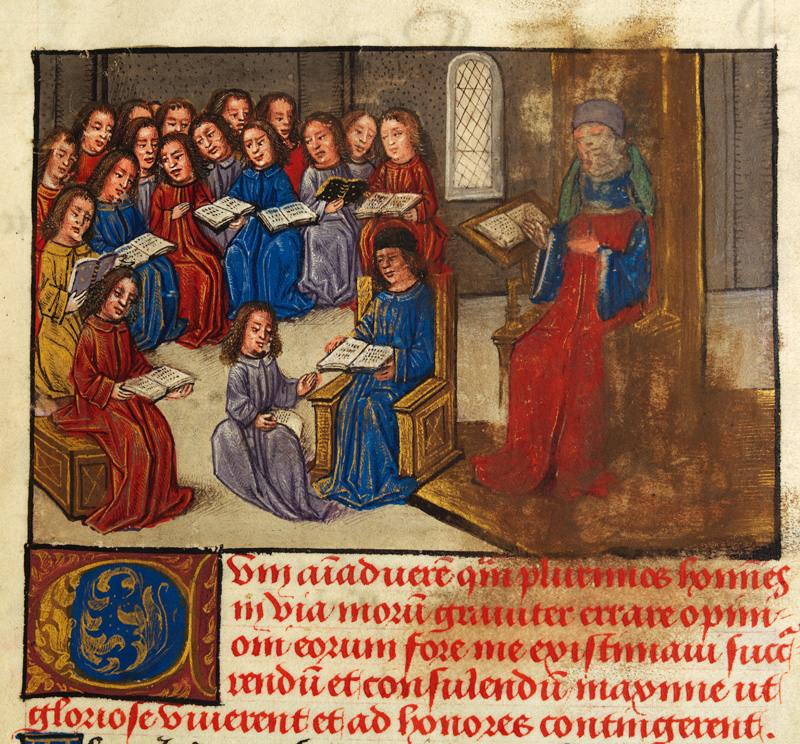
Folio 1r.: School, with Cato and his translator (seated below) instructing pupils.

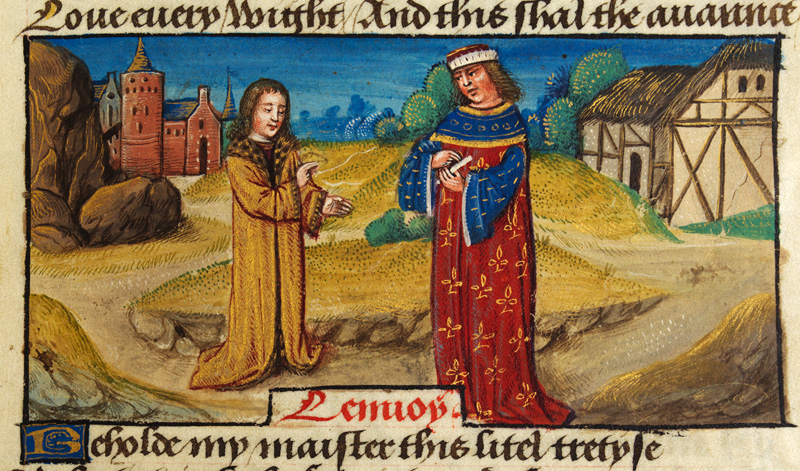
Folio 2r.: Translator addressing his master on a road leading from a castle to a farm.

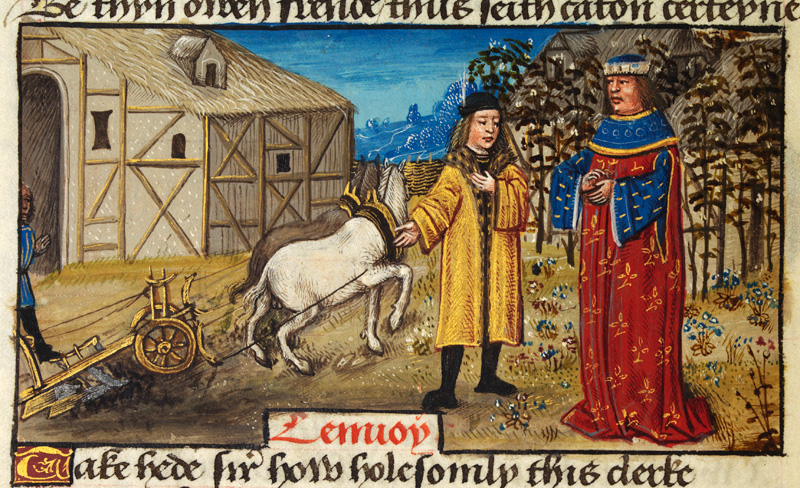
Folio 8v.: Translator addressing his master, with a man ploughing in the background.

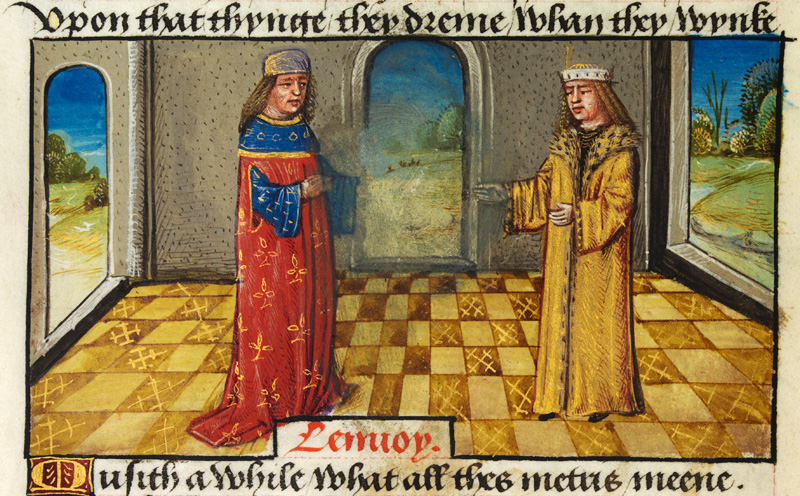
Folio 14v.: Translator addressing his master, indoors.

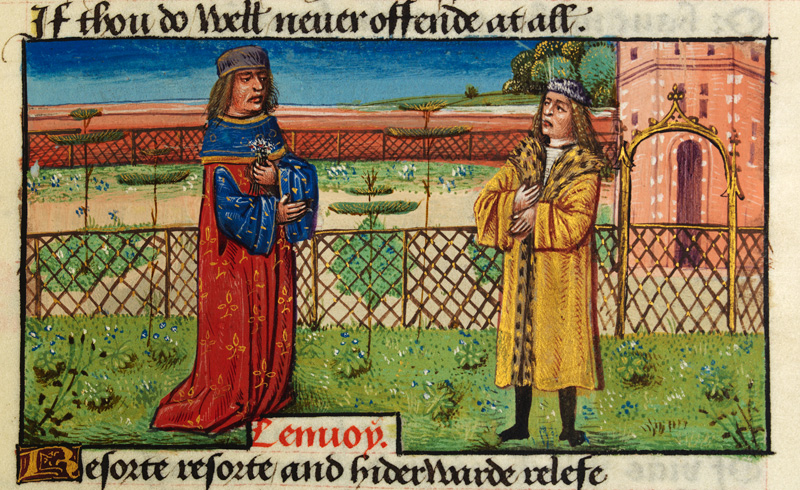
Folio 19r.: Translator addressing his master, in a garden.

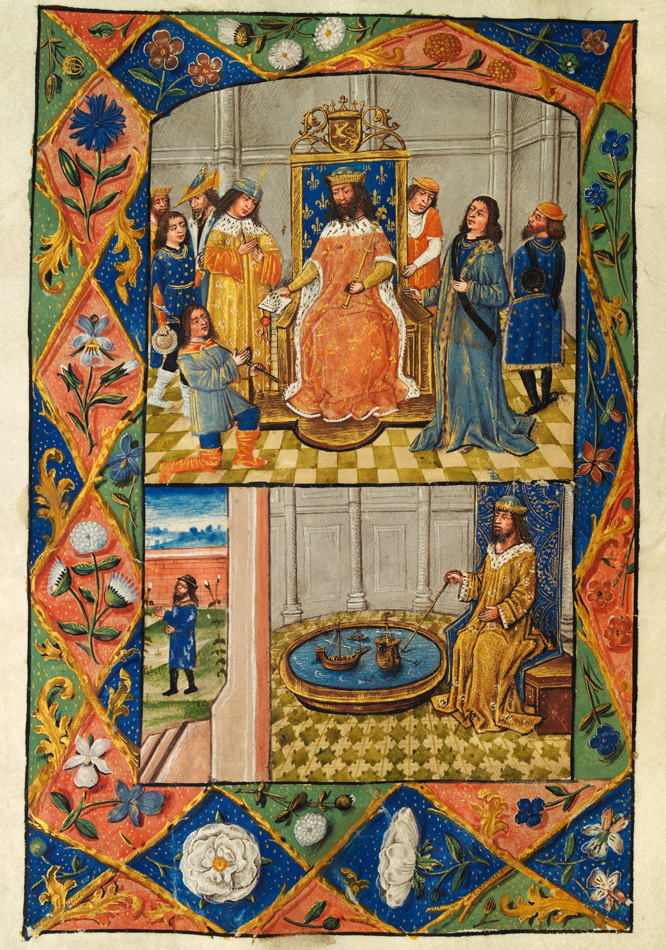
Folio 29v.: (i) Nectanebus enthroned, receiving news of Artaxerxes’ threatened invasion; (ii) Nectanebus in his chamber bewitching Artaxerxes’ fleet in a basin of water.

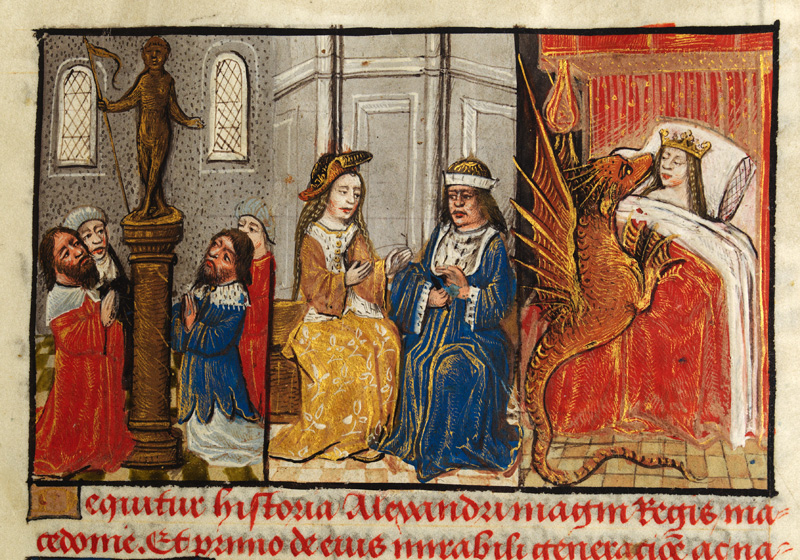
Folio 30r.: Translator addressing his master.

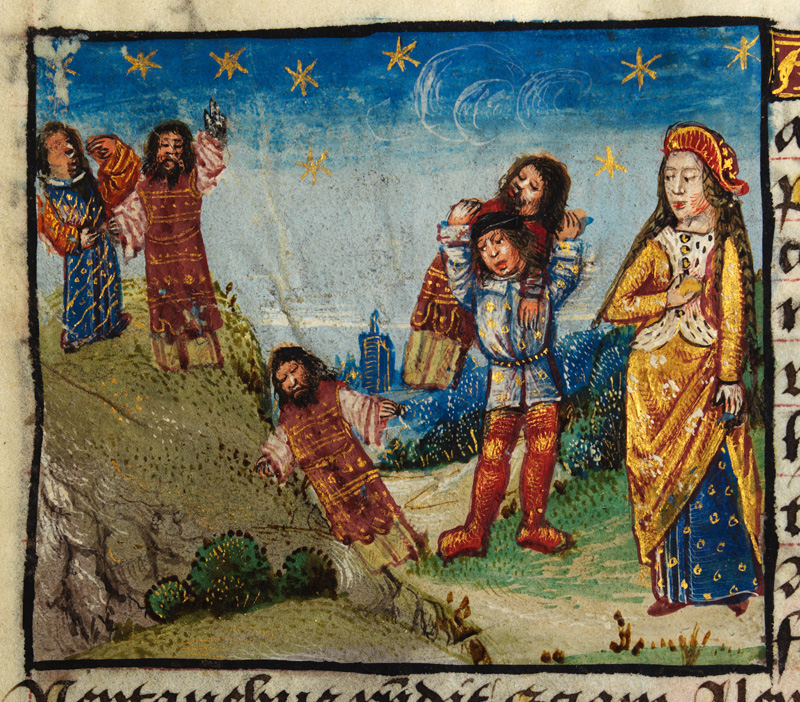
Folio 34r.: Alexander killing Nectanebus, his father, by throwing him into a ditch.

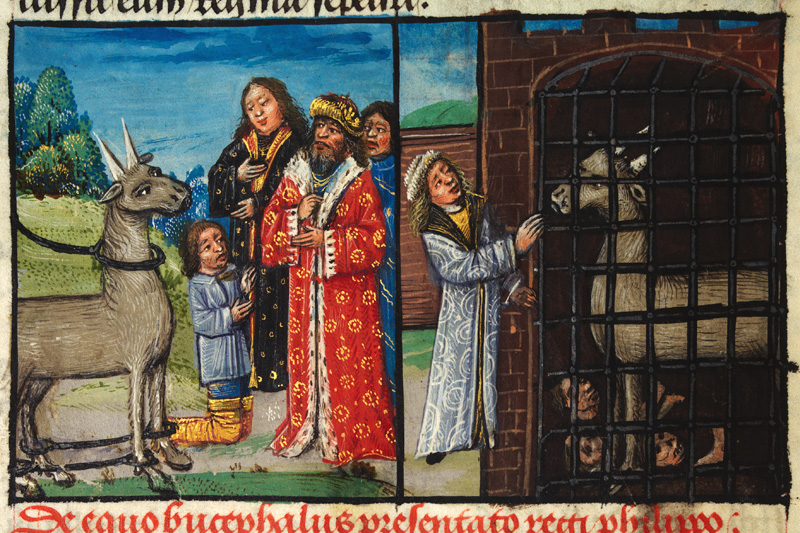
Folio 34v.: Bucephalus being presented to Philip; Bucephalus in a cage with the remains of condemned criminals, being tamed by Alexander.

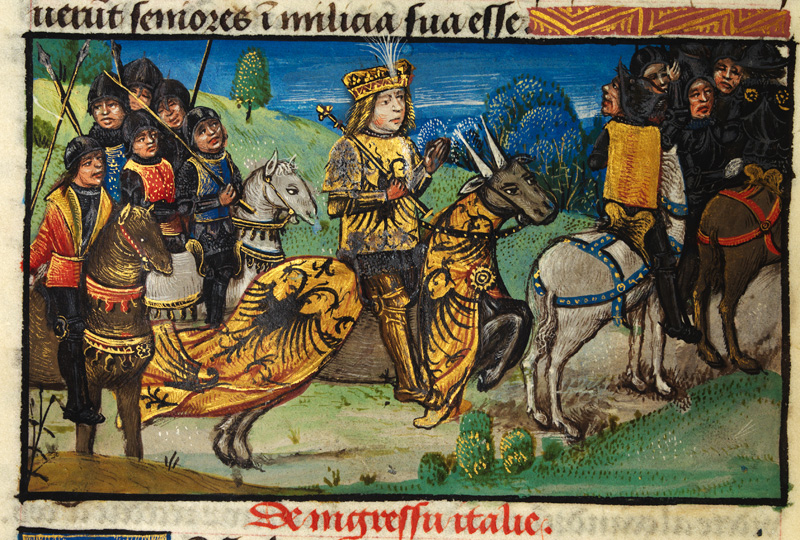
Folio 37v.: Alexander, mounted on Bucephalus, entering Italy with his followers.

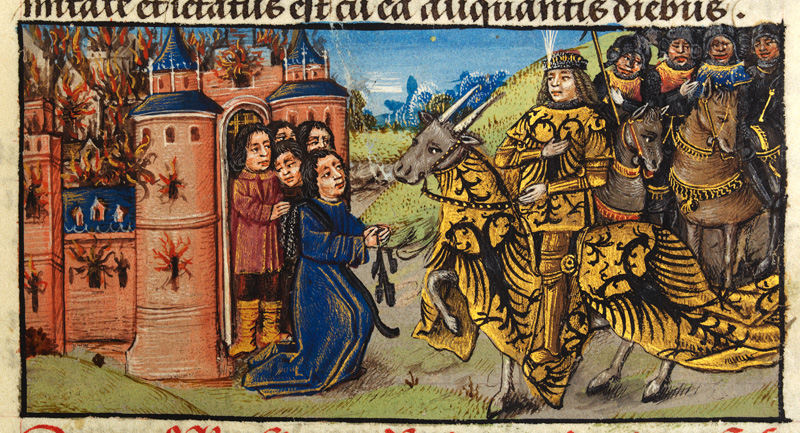
Folio 44r: Alexander outside the gates of Abdyra receiving the keys of the city.

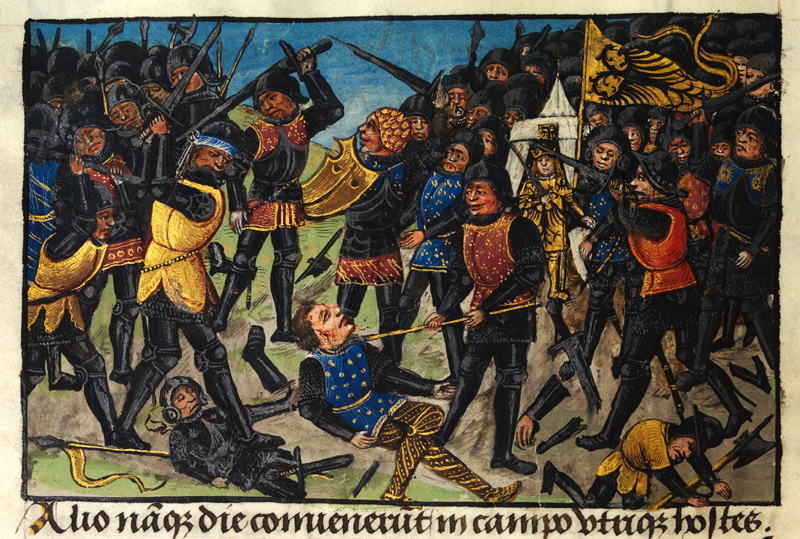
Folio 51v.: Alexander's first victory over Darius, the Persian king.

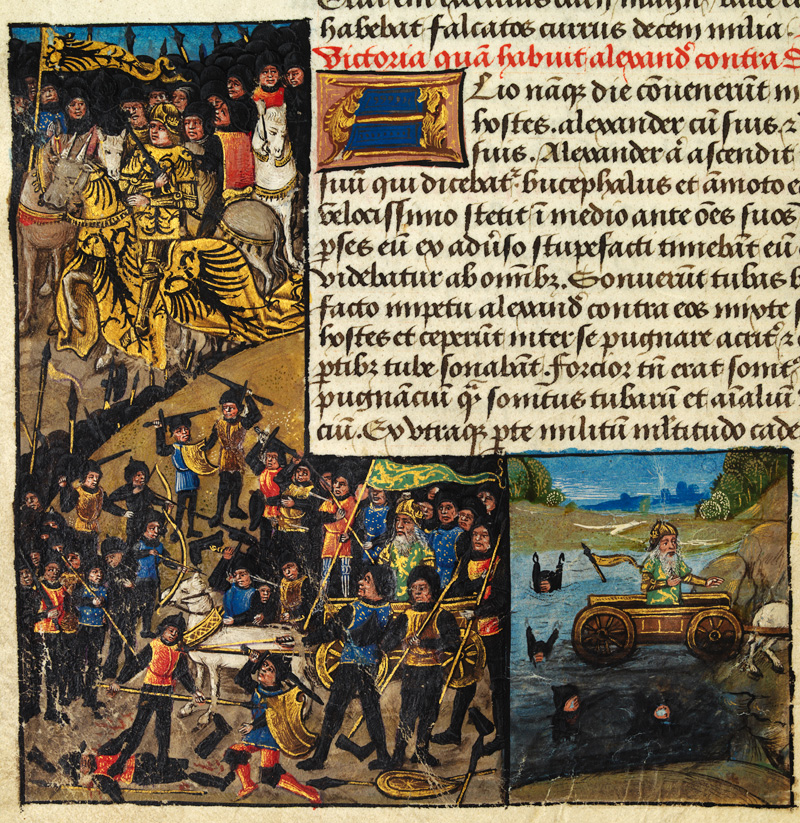
Folio 56v.: Alexander's third victory over Darius; Darius escaping over the river in a cart.

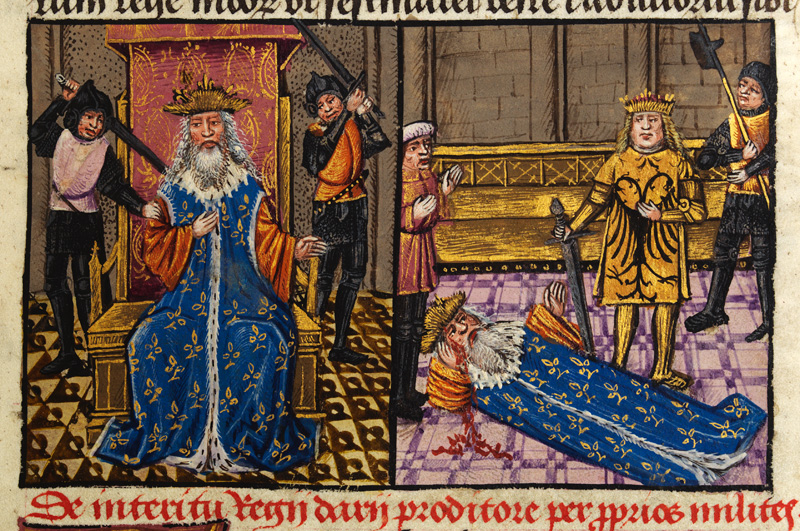
Folio 59r: The murder of Darius by his own generals; Alexander at the side of the dying king.

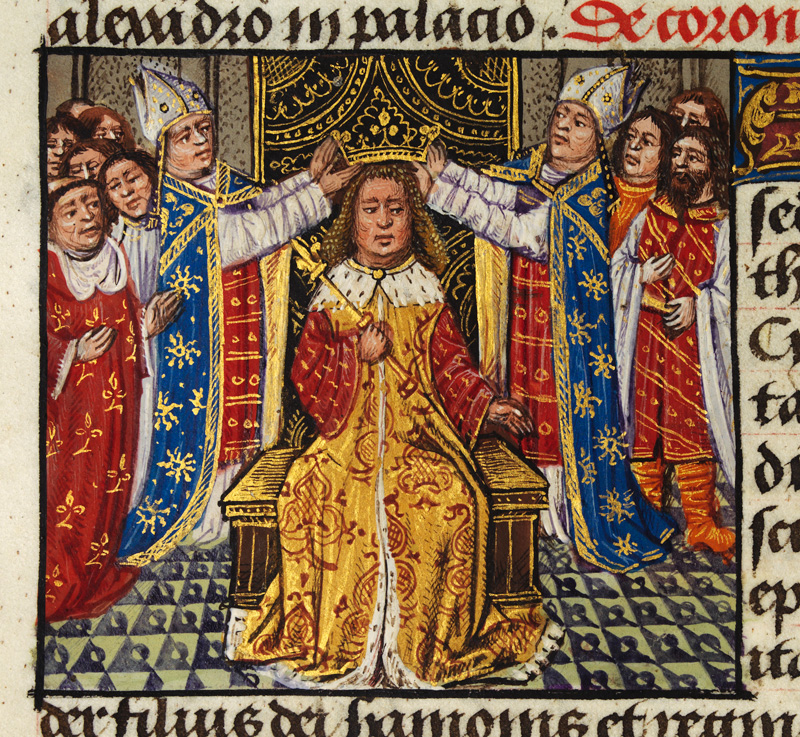
Folio 60v.: The coronation of Alexander.

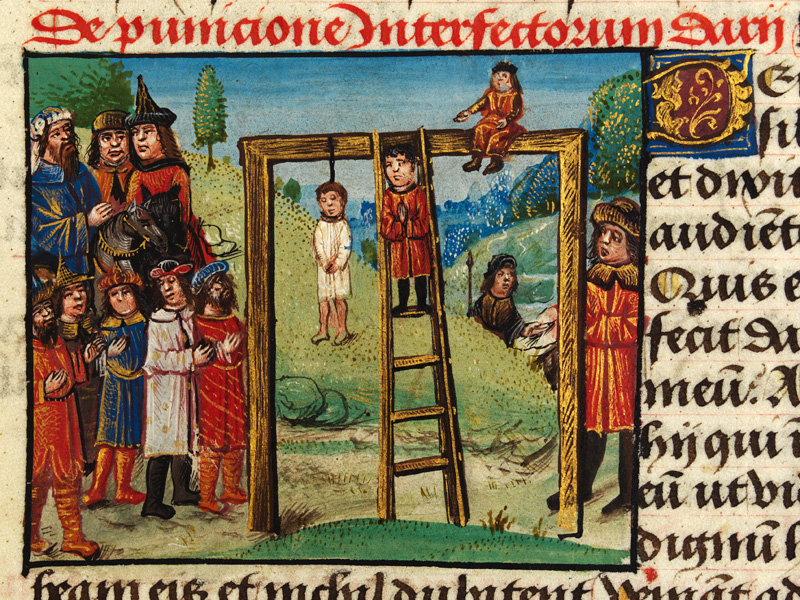
Folio 61r.: Alexander has the murderers of Darius executed by hanging.

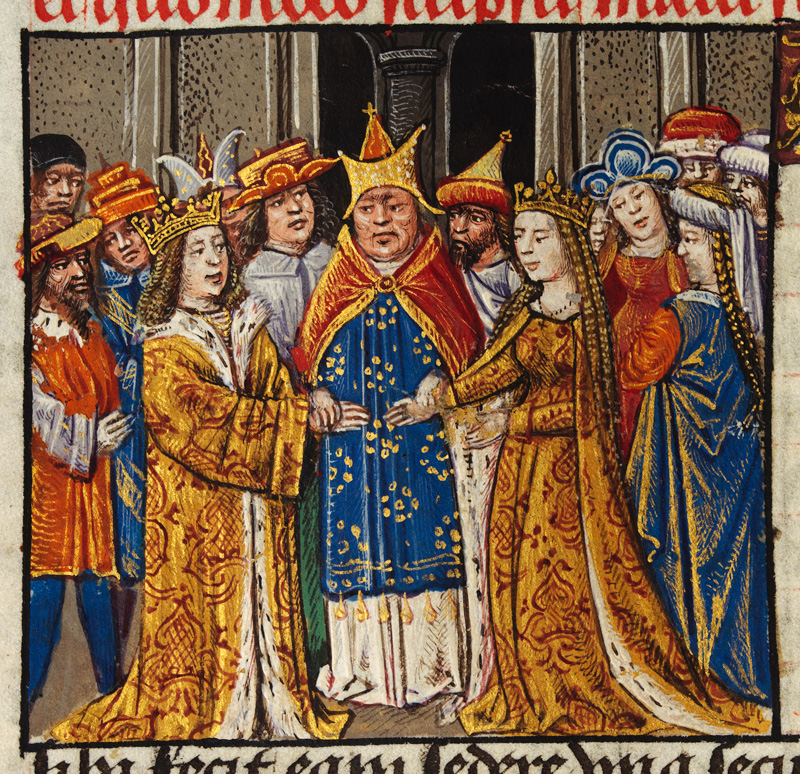
Folio 61v.: The marriage of Alexander and Darius’ daughter.

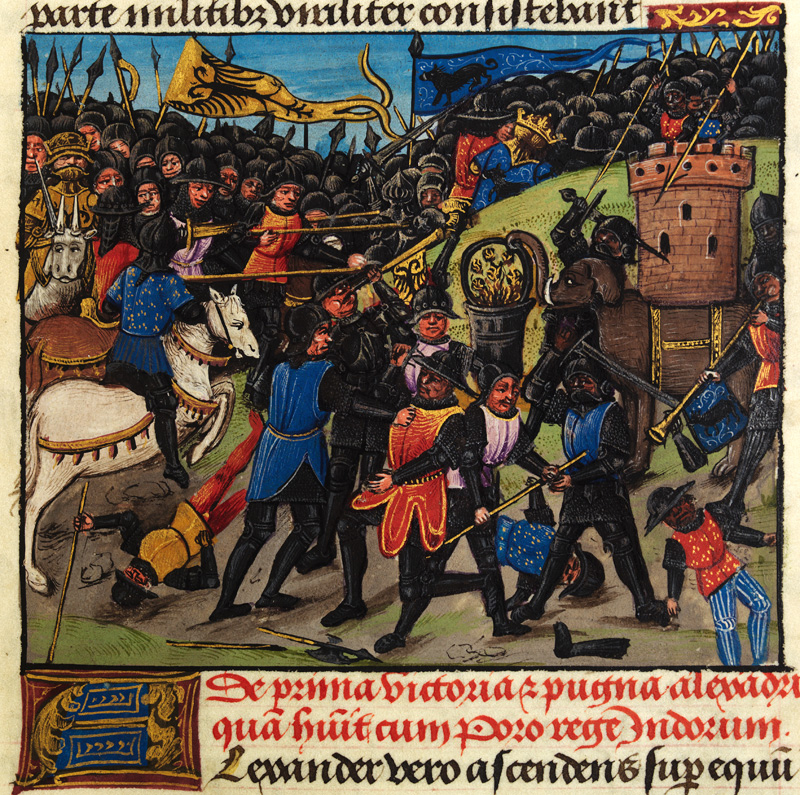
Folio 64r.: Alexander's first victory over Porus.

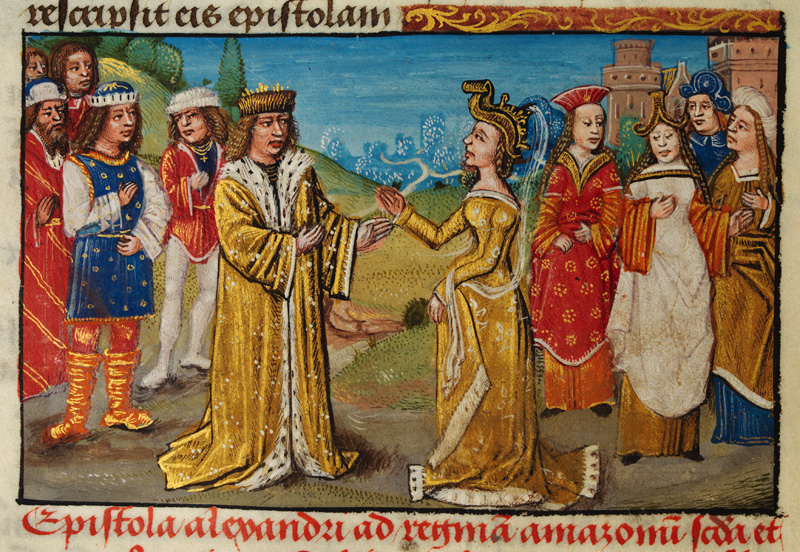
Folio 66v.: Alexander's meeting with Talistris, Queen of the Amazons.

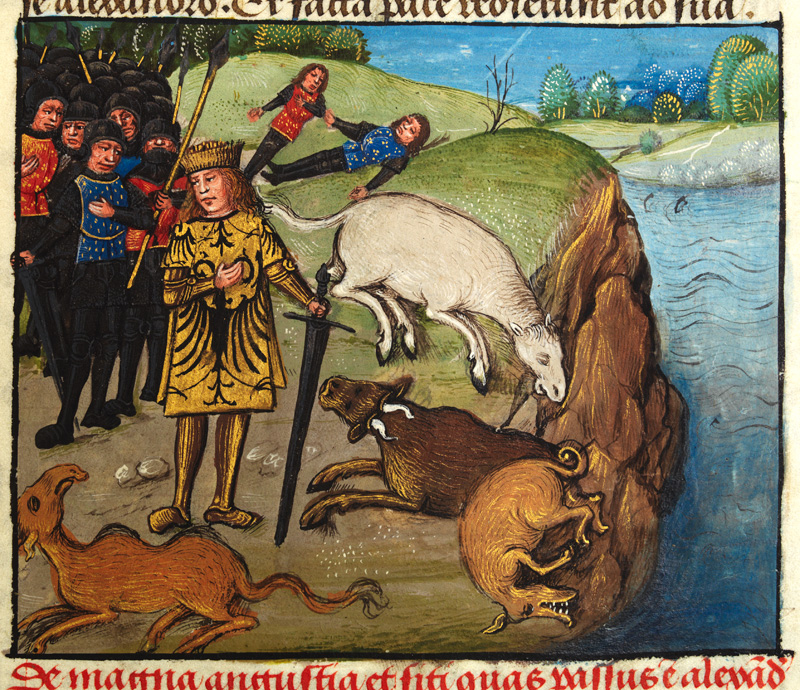
Folio 67r.: Alexander, his men and beasts suffering from thirst by a river.

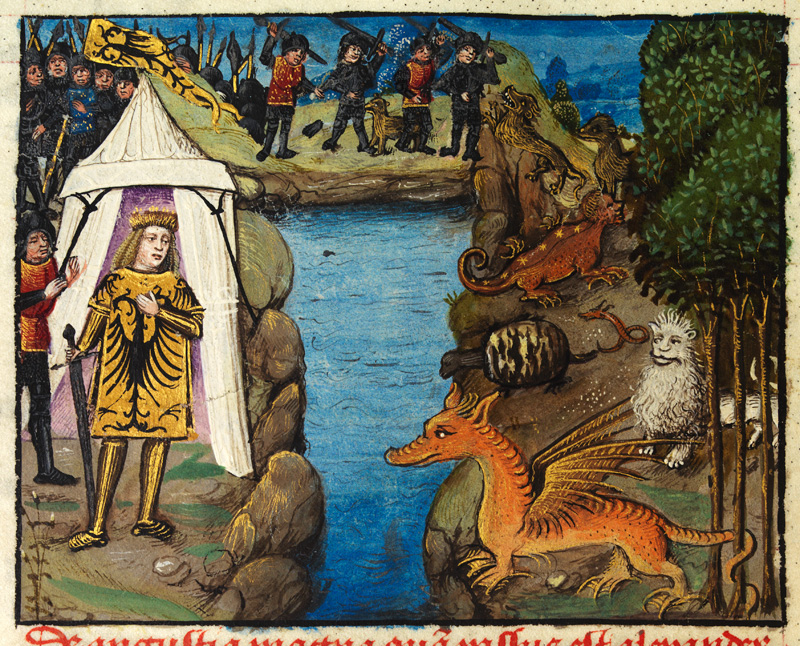
Folio 68v.: Alexander and his men facing amazing beasts across a river.

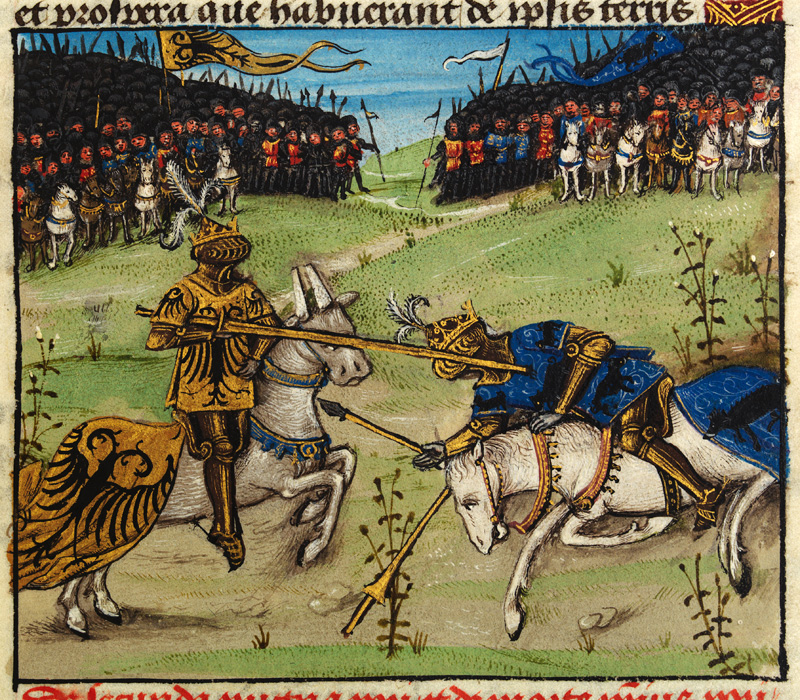
Folio 70r.: Alexander killing Porus in single combat before their armies.

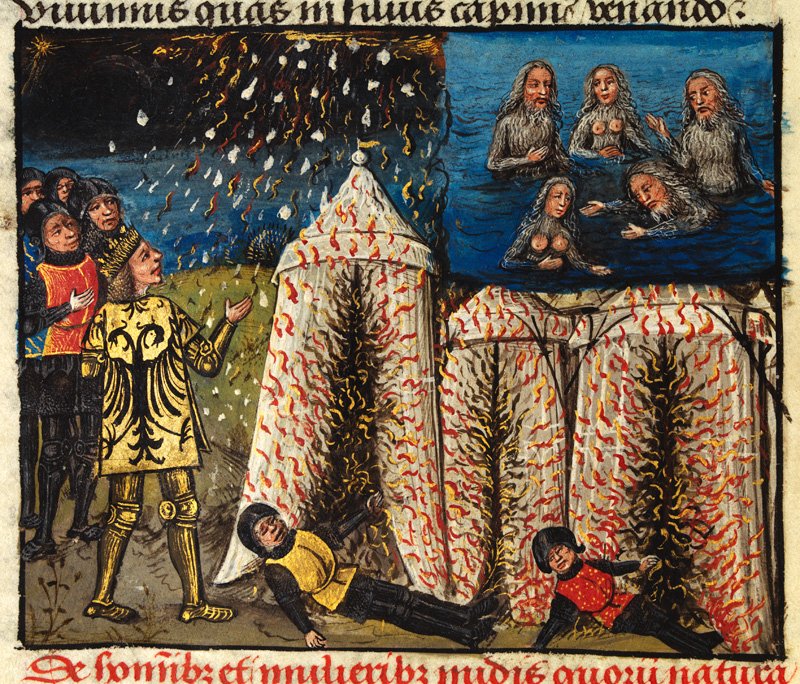
Folio 72v.: Alexander's tents on fire, and amphibious men and women standing in water.

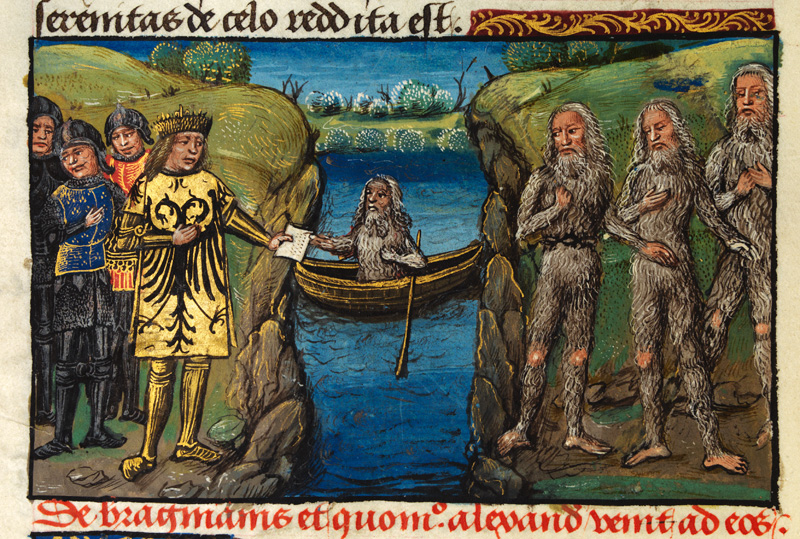
Folio 73v.: Alexander sending a message over a river to the Brahmins.

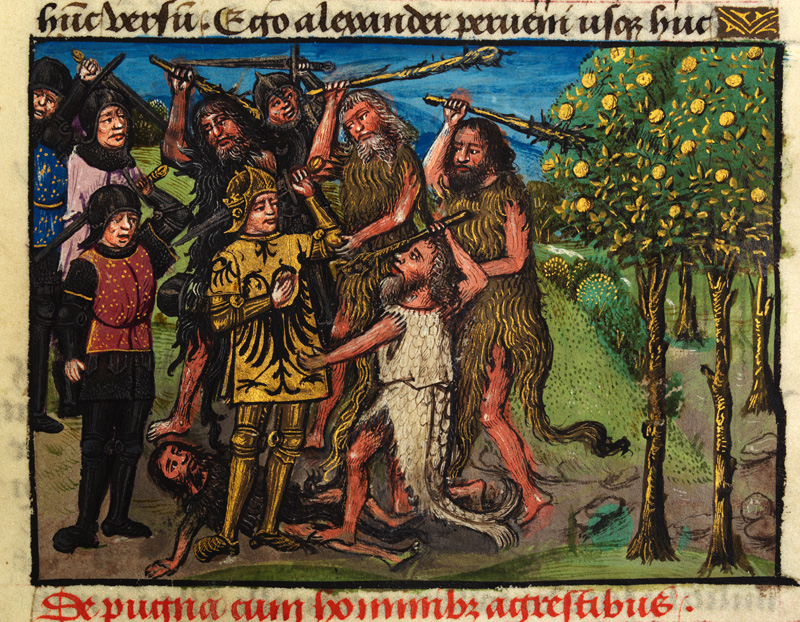
Folio 82r.: The battle with woodland men armed with clubs.

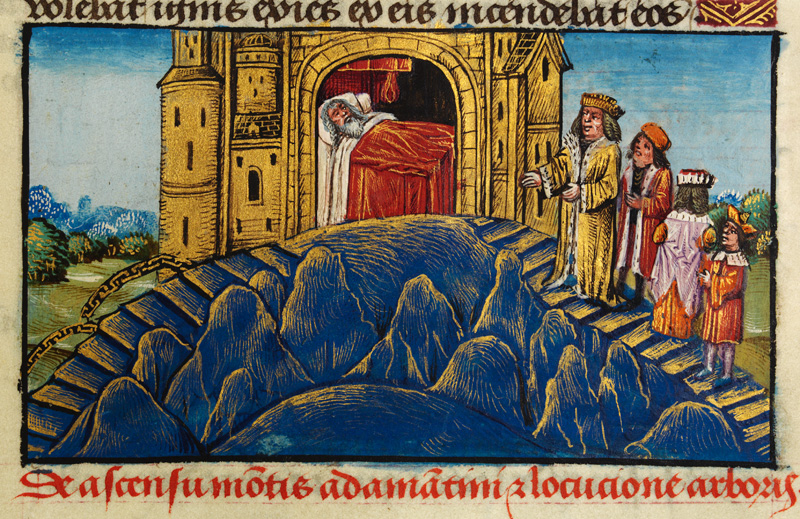
Folio 83r.: Alexander climbing up to the palace on the Adamantine mountain.

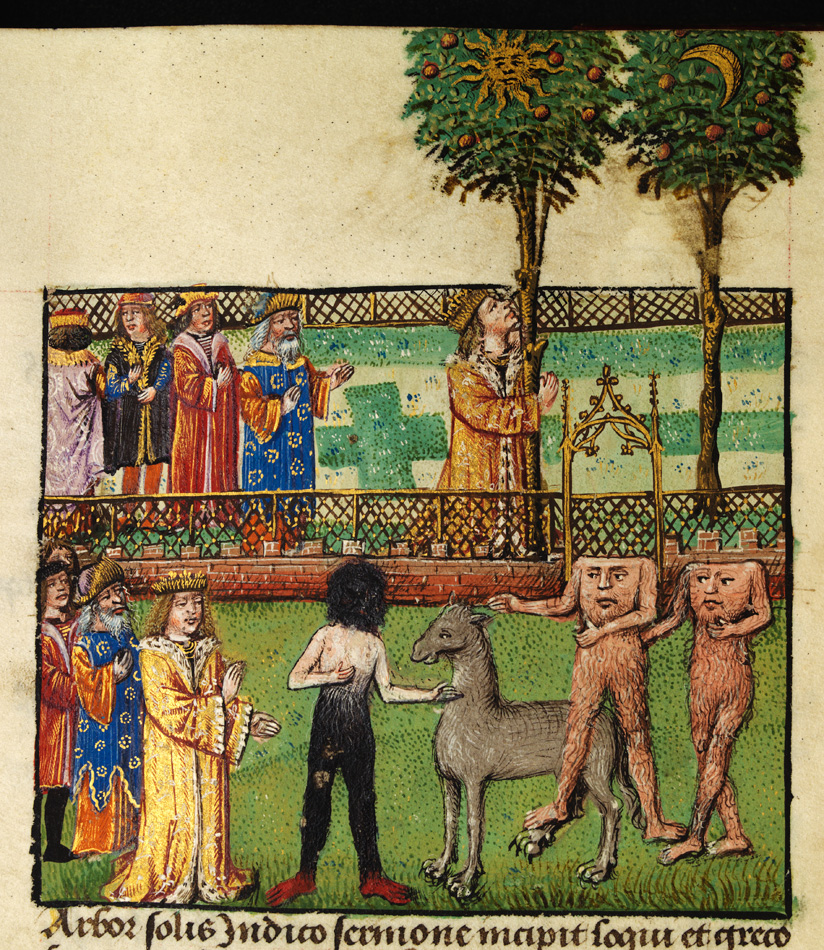
Folio 84v.: Alexander and his companions consult the prophetic trees of the Sun and the Moon; Alexander meeting a black-legged monster man, a horse-lion and headless men.

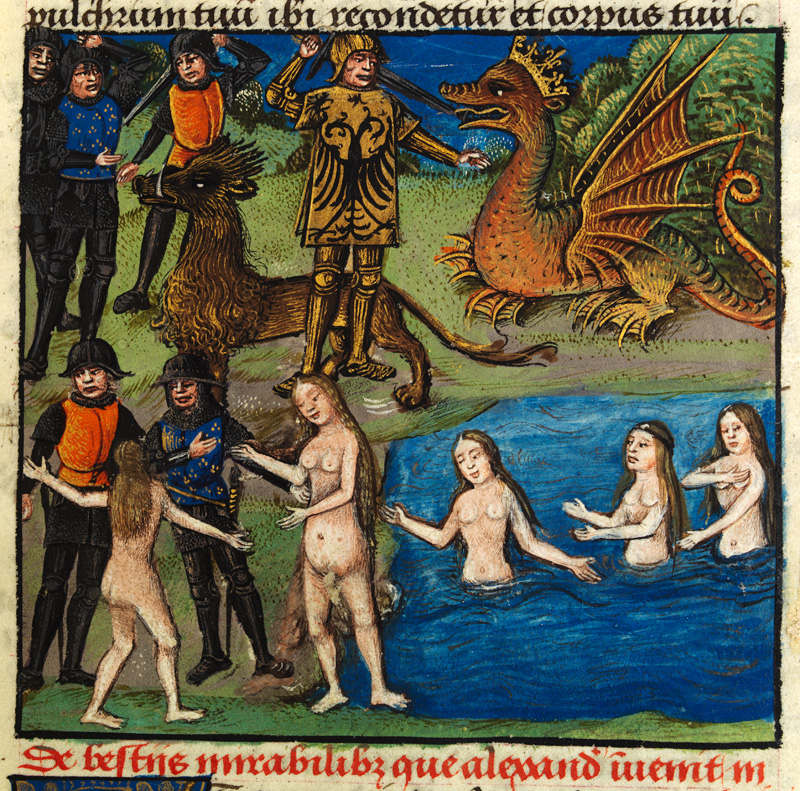
Folio 90r.: Alexander fighting a crowned dragon; long-haired women emerging from a river.

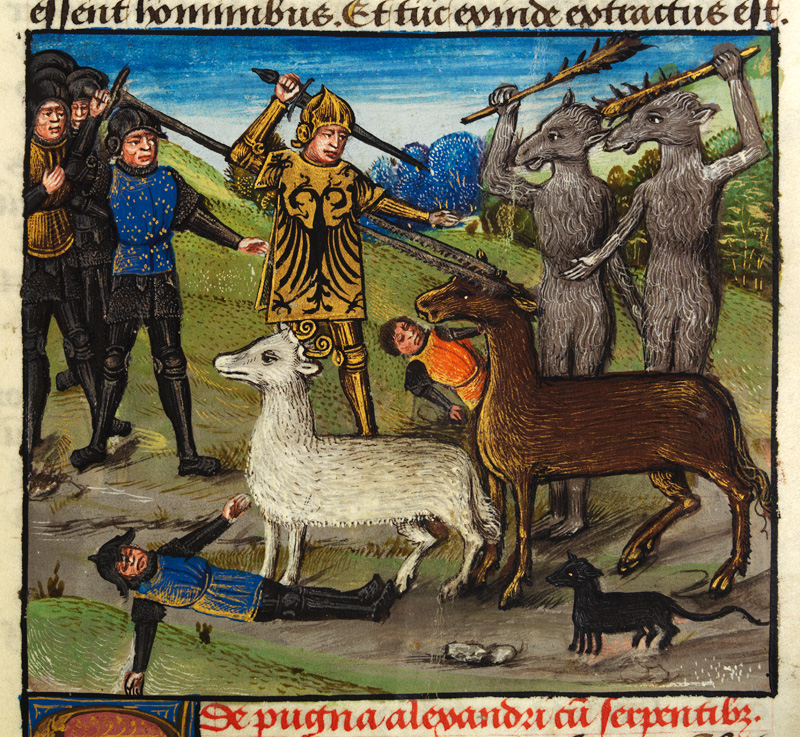
Folio 92r.: Alexander fighting the dog-headed Cynocephali.

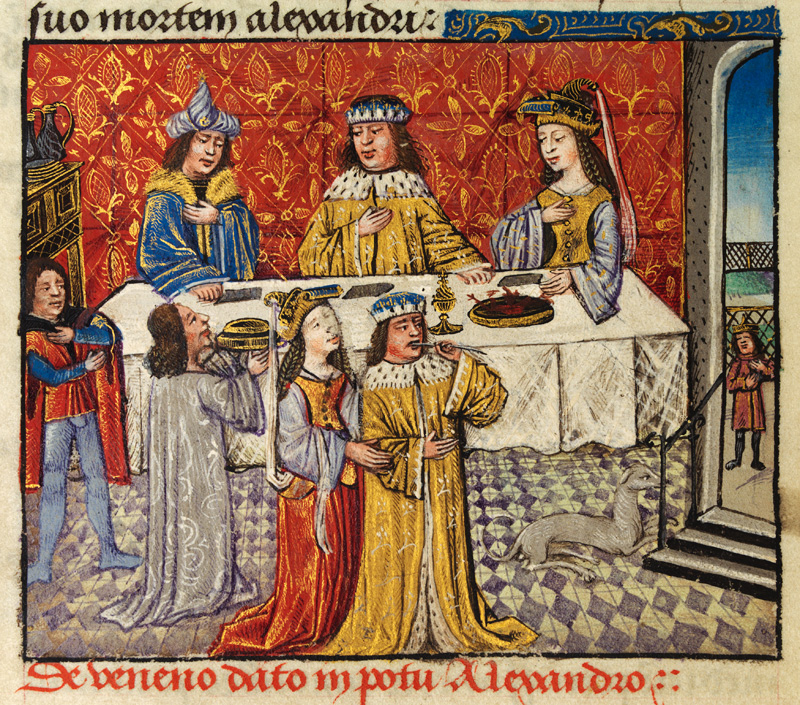
Folio 94v.: Alexander and his queen at table, and again in the foreground with a feather in his throat after being poisoned.

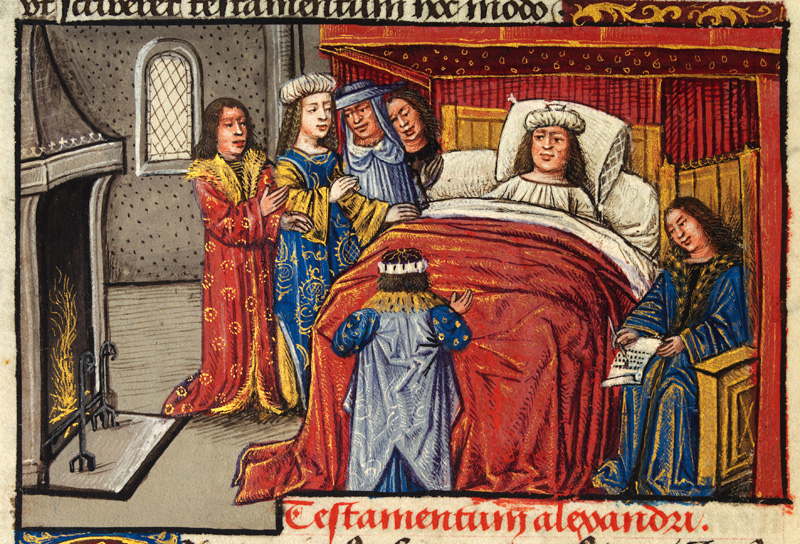
Folio 95v.: Alexander on his deathbed, surrounded by mourners, and dictating his will to his notary.
