= Dandamis =

Indian philosopher of the 4th century BC

Dandamis, depicted as a king of the cave-dwelling Brahmins, writes to Alexander in an illustration from the Middle English poem Alexander and Dindimus

Dandamis (presumably Greek rendering of "Dandayan-Svami") was a philosopher, swami and gymnosophist whom Alexander encountered in the woods near Taxila, when he invaded India in 4th century B.C. He is also referred to as Mandanes. He was guru of Kalanos, the noted gymnosophist, who accompanied Alexander to Persis.

According to the Commonitorium Palladii, when Alexander met some gymnosophists, who were of trouble to him, he learned that their leader was the Brahmin Dandamis, who lived in the jungle, lying naked on leaves, near a water spring.

He then sent Onescratus to bring Dandamis to him. When Onescratus encountered Dandamis in forest, he gave him the message, that "Alexander, the Great son of Zeus, has ordered him to come to him. He will give you gold and other rewards but if you refuse, he may behead you." When Dandamis heard that, he did not even raise his head and replied lying in his bed of leaves. "God the Great King, is not a source of violence but provider of water, food, light and life. Your king cannot be a God, who loves violence and who is mortal. Even if you take away my head, you cannot take away my soul, which will depart to my God and leave this body like we throw away old garment. We, brahman do not love gold nor fear death. So your king has nothing to offer, which I may need. Go and tell your King: Dandamis, therefore, will not come to you. If he needs Dandamis, he must come to me."

When Alexander learned of Dandamis' reply, he went to the forest to meet him. Alexander sat before him in the forest for more than an hour. Dandamis asked why Alexander came to him, saying "I have nothing to offer you. Because we have no thought of pleasure or gold, we love God and despise death, whereas you love pleasure, gold and kill people, you fear death and despise God." Alexander stated, "I heard your name from Calanus and have come to learn wisdom from you." The conversation that followed between them is recorded by Greeks as Alexander–Dandamis colloquy.

In the Latin tradition, Dandamis' name is Dindimus and he is known for the two letters he supposedly wrote to Alexander explicating the Brahmin way of life, the Collatio Alexandri et Dindimi. The correspondence, however, is spurious.

== See also ==
- King Porus
- Milinda Panha
- Hinduism
- Ambhi
- Darius III
- Spirituality
