= Onesicritus =

Ancient Greek historical writer and philosopher

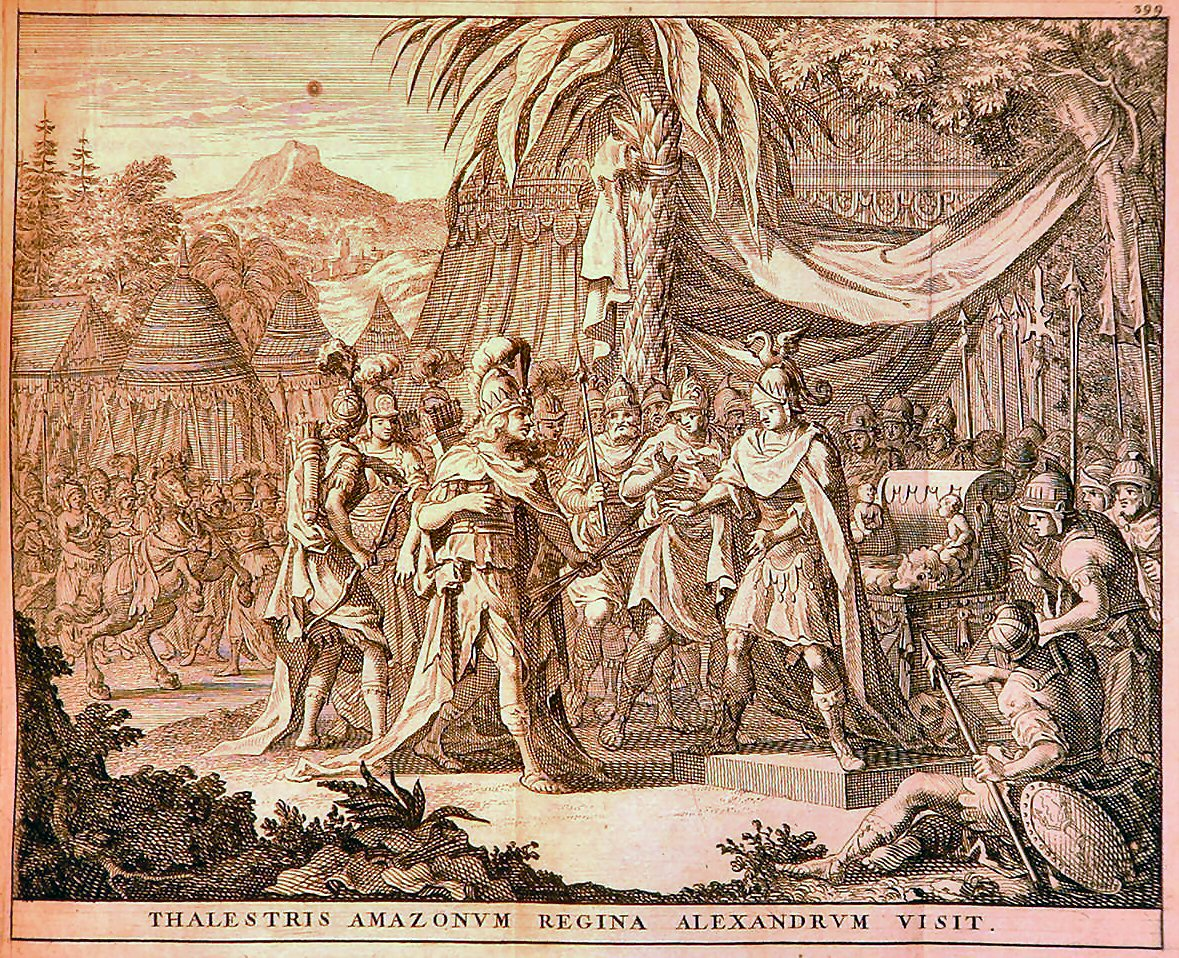
Alexander the Great receives a visit from Thalestris, queen of the Amazons, one of the legends recounted by Onesicritus.

Onesicritus (Greek: Ὀνησίκριτος; c. 360 BC – c. 290 BC), a Greek historical writer and Cynic philosopher, who accompanied Alexander the Great on his campaigns in Asia. He claimed to have been the commander of Alexander's fleet but was actually only a helmsman; Arrian and Nearchus often criticize him for this. When he returned home, he wrote a history of Alexander's campaigns. He is frequently cited by later authors, who also criticize him for his inaccuracies.

== Life ==
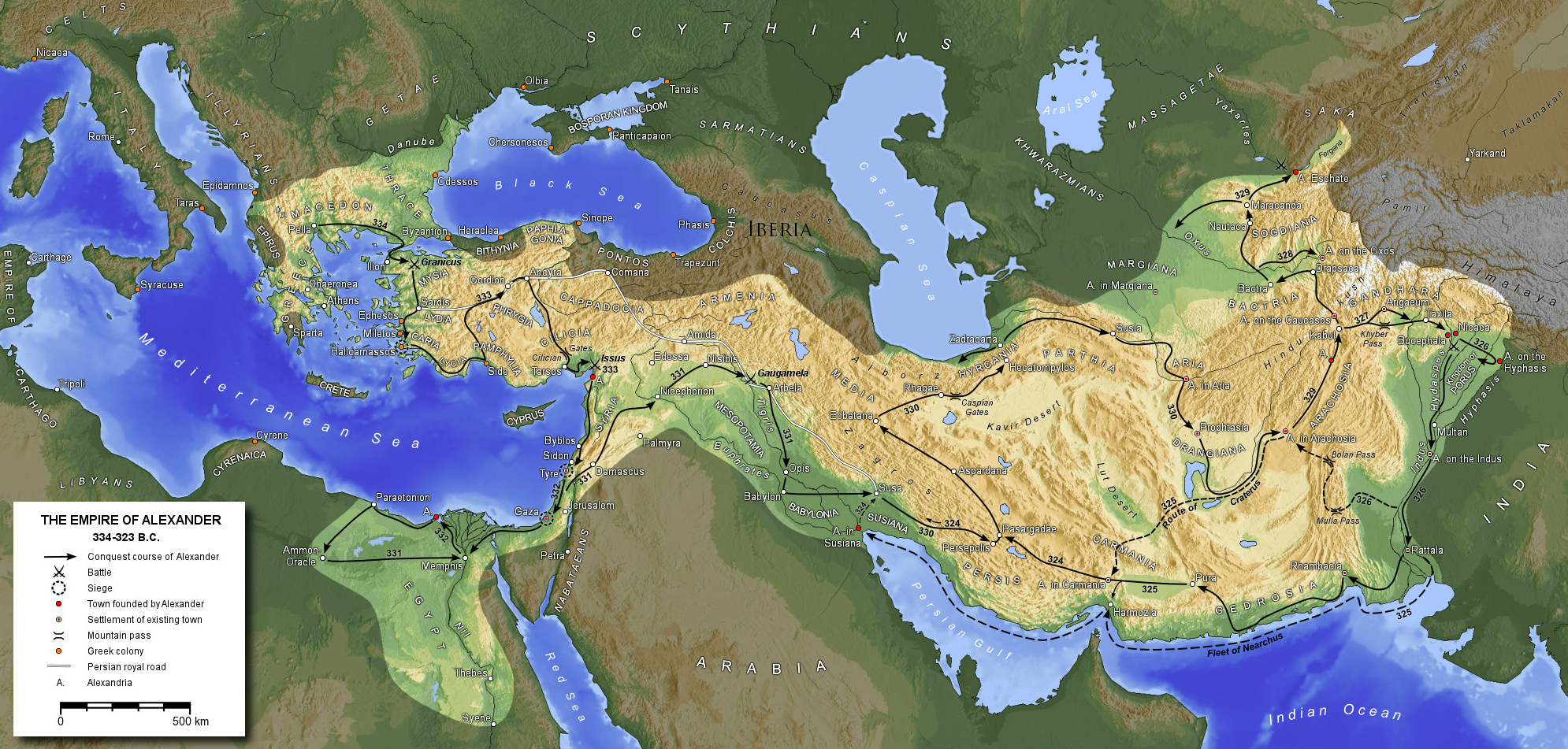
Map of Alexander the Great's empire and the route he and Onesicritus took to India

He was a native of Astypalaia, and it was probably to this island origin that he owed the nautical skills which would prove so advantageous to him. He was a disciple of Diogenes of Sinope, the Cynic philosopher. Diogenes Laërtius also calls him "Onesicritus of Aegina", and says that he came to Athens because his two adult sons, Androsthenes and Philiscus, were attracted to the philosophy of Diogenes the Cynic, for which reason Onesicritus also became an ardent disciple. If so, he must have been already advanced in years when he joined the expedition of Alexander.

There is no known account of the circumstances which led him to accompany Alexander into Asia, nor in what capacity he attended on the conqueror; but during the expedition into India he was sent by the king to hold a conference with the Indian philosophers or Gymnosophists, the details of which have been transmitted to us from his own account of the interview. It was Onesicritus, whom Alexander first sent to summon Dandamis to his court. When later Onesicritus returned empty-handed with the reply of Dandamis, the King went to forest to visit Dandamis. When Alexander constructed his fleet on the Hydaspes, he appointed Onesicritus to the important position of pilot of the king's ship, or chief pilot of the fleet (Greek: ἀρχικυβερνήτης). Onesicritus held this position not only during the descent of the Indus, but throughout the long and perilous voyage from the river to the Persian Gulf. Alexander was so satisfied with his work that, on his arrival at Susa, Onesicritus was rewarded with a crown of gold, at the same time as Nearchus. Yet Arrian blames him for lack of judgment, and on one occasion expressly ascribes the safety of the fleet to the firmness of Nearchus in overruling his advice. We know nothing of his subsequent fortunes; but from an anecdote related by Plutarch it seems that he attached himself to Lysimachus, and it was perhaps at the court of that monarch that he composed his historical work; though, on the other hand, a passage of Lucian suggests that this work was begun during the lifetime of Alexander himself.

== Writings ==
We learn from Diogenes Laërtius that Onesicritus wrote a work about Alexander called How Alexander was Educated (Greek: Πῶς Ἀλέξανδρος Ἤχθη), imitating the style of Xenophon, though he fell short of him as a copy does of the original. It is most frequently cited in regard to the campaigns of Alexander in Asia, and for descriptions of the countries that he visited. Though an eye-witness of much that he described, it appears that he intermixed many fables and falsehoods with his narrative, so that he early fell into discredit as an authority. Strabo is especially severe upon him. Plutarch cites him as one of those who related the fable of the visit of the Amazons to Alexander, for which he was justly ridiculed by Lysimachus, and Arrian accuses him of falsely representing himself as the commander of the fleet, when he was in truth only the pilot. Aulus Gellius even associates him with Aristeas of Proconnesus, and other purely fabulous writers. But it is clear that these censures are overcharged; and though some of the statements cited from him are certainly gross exaggerations, his work appears to have contained much valuable information concerning the remote countries for the first time laid open by the expedition of Alexander. In particular he was the first author that mentioned the island of Taprobane, which is known today as Sri Lanka.
