= Francis Peabody Magoun =

American flying ace and academic

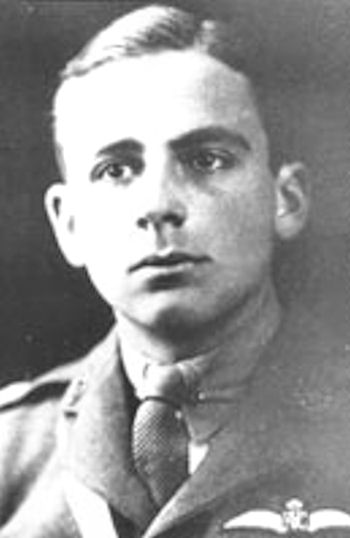
- Francis Peabody Magoun, 1918
- Born: 5 January 1895; New York, New York
- Died: 5 June 1979 (aged 84); Cambridge, Massachusetts
- Education: Harvard University
- Military career
- Allegiance: United States
- Branch: Royal Air Force (United Kingdom)
- Unit: Royal Air Force: No. 1 Squadron RAF
- Conflicts: World War I
- Awards: Military Cross, Order of the Lion of Finland

Francis Peabody Magoun Jr. MC (6 January 1895 – 5 June 1979) was one of the seminal figures in the study of medieval and English literature in the 20th century, a scholar of subjects as varied as soccer and ancient Germanic naming practices, and translator of numerous important texts. Though an American, he served in the British Royal Flying Corps (later Royal Air Force) as a lieutenant during World War I. Magoun was victor in five aerial combats and was also decorated with Britain's Military Cross for gallantry.

== Early life and military career ==
Magoun was born to a prosperous family in New York City. His parents were Francis Peabody Magoun (1865–1928) and Jeanne C. Bartholow (1870–1957). He received his primary education at the St. Andrew's School in Concord, Massachusetts, and at the Noble and Greenough School in Boston. He took his bachelors degree at Harvard in (1916), and in February of that year signed on with the American Field Service. From 3 March – 3 August he was a volunteer ambulance driver.

After a brief return to the United States, he went to London and enlisted in the Royal Flying Corps (to become eligible for service in the RAF, he lied and said he was Canadian; he claimed that he was from a town there where all birth records and other vital statistics had been lost in a fire). On 4 July 1917, he was commissioned a second lieutenant and assigned to No. 1 Squadron RFC on 14 November, flying Nieuport biplanes (later replaced by SE5a biplanes) against more manoeuvrable Fokker triplanes. He downed his first enemy aircraft on 28 February 1918, near Gheluvelt, another on 10 March fifteen miles (24 km) east of Ypres, and a third on 15 March in the vicinity of Dadizeele. His fourth was on 28 March near Quiery. He was wounded in action while strafing enemy troops on 10 April, but returned to his squadron in October and became an ace on 28 October, downing a Fokker D.VII near Anor for his fifth victory.

Magoun was awarded the Military Cross (MC) in June 1918: "For conspicuous gallantry and devotion to duty. When engaged on bombing work he attacked and shot down an enemy machine, with the result that it crashed to earth. He has also engaged massed enemy troops and transport with machine gun fire from low altitudes, throwing the enemy into the utmost confusion and inflicting heavy casualties. His work has been carried out with consistent keenness and tenacity."

== Scholarly career ==
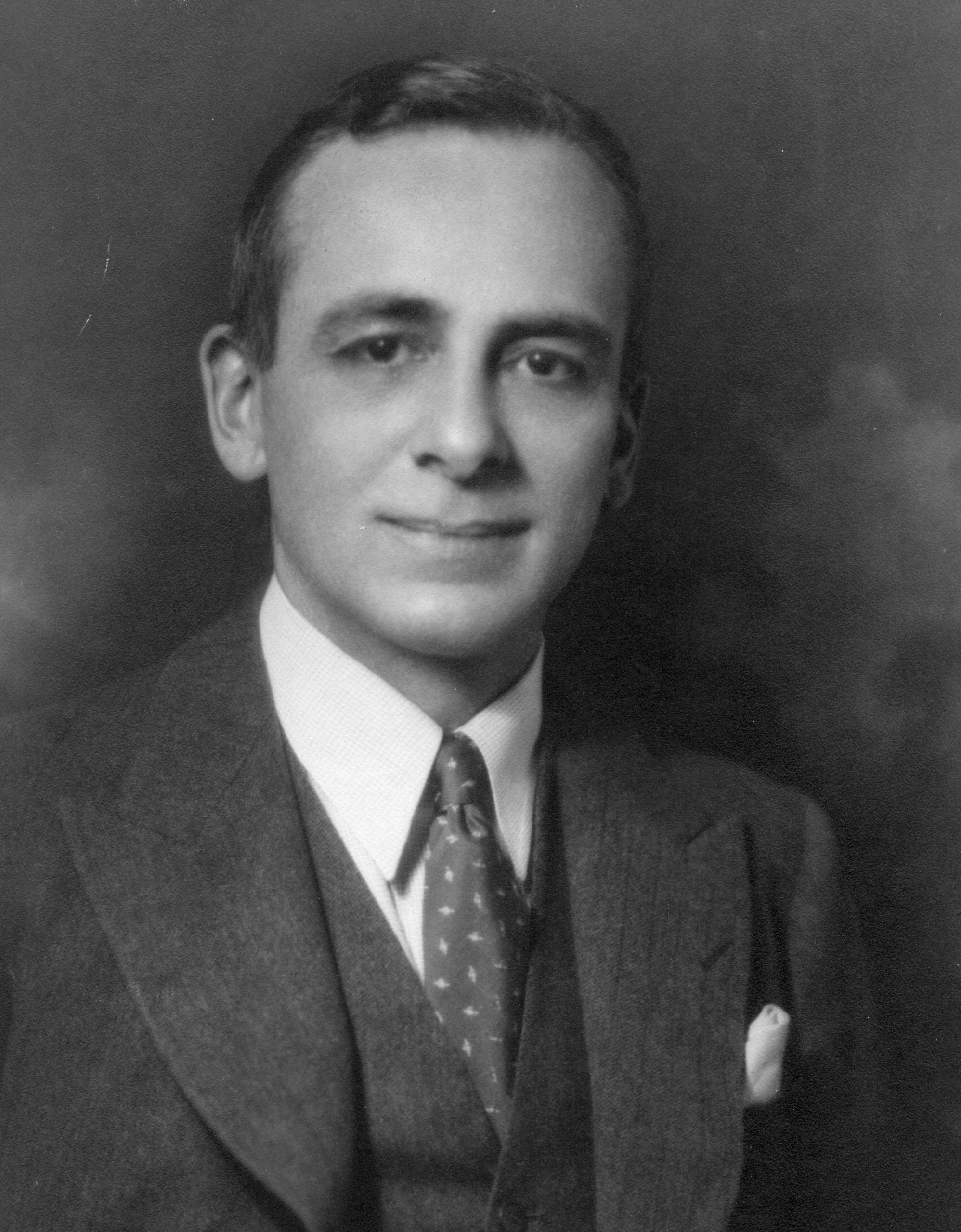
Francis P. Magoun Jr. in 1930

Upon his return to the United States, he was appointed instructor in Comparative Literature at Harvard (1919); during this period, he completed his PhD in English philology at Harvard University with his 1923 dissertation on two English version of the Historia de preliis. His work was also part of the literature event in the art competition at the 1936 Summer Olympics.

At Harvard, he was made Instructor of English, and proceeded through the academic ranks thereafter (Professor of Comparative Literature, 1937; Professor of English, 1951). His tweedy figure was familiar on campus; he was rumored to have no office, and it was said he could only be spoken to while walking. He also became an explicit supporter of Germany's Nazi regime.

He was distinguished by a longstanding interest in popular antiquities. Along with Alexander Haggerty Krappe, he was the first scholarly translator of the folktales collected by the Brothers Grimm into English. But he was also developing a theoretical and methodological framework for his eclectic interests. David Bynum, in his history of English studies at Harvard, affirms Magoun's importance as a link between the pioneering work of George Lyman Kittredge in folklore and ethnomusicology (as they related to literary history) and the work of Milman Parry; Magoun took inspiration from Parry and Lord's field observation of the oral poetry of the guslars of Yugoslavia (which they had compared to the Homeric poems), and extended their methods to the study of Anglo-Saxon poetry. The 1953 article on Beowulf, "The Oral-Formulaic Character of Anglo-Saxon Narrative Poetry," published in Speculum, was of particular importance in the view of Albert Lord (for whom Magoun served as dissertation advisor; he was also one of Walter Ong's teachers). Magoun argued that written Anglo-Saxon poetry was essentially a transcription of traditional oral performance, and furthermore, heavily imbued with pre-Christian ideas and values. The position has implications for how Anglo-Saxon poetry should be approached for purposes of literary criticism. His ideas sparked ongoing controversy among medievalists, with some accepting his view, others arguing for a written poetry inspired by traditional idiom and methods (and a complex layering of Christian and pre-Christian influences), and still others insisting that the entire Anglo-Saxon corpus consists of individually authored, written texts with an exclusively Christian matrix of belief. The essay has been anthologized many times.

In late middle age, he undertook to learn the Finnish language in order to explore another area of oral tradition, and exercised considerable influence upon Finnish studies; contemporaries remember the growing library of Finnish texts in his house on Reservoir Street. His 1963 prose translation of the Kalevala remains a standard, and he was awarded the Finnish Order of the Lion of Finland in 1964 for his contributions to the study of Finnish culture.

He retired from Harvard in 1961, and he was honored at the close of his career with a well-regarded Festschrift: Franciplegius; medieval and linguistic studies in honor of Francis Peabody Magoun, Jr., edited by Jess B. Bessinger and Robert Payson Creed.

In a legend circulating among medievalists, Magoun is said to have been the model for the character Mr. Magoo. However, there is no evidence that artist John Hubley knew the scholar.

== Family life ==
Magoun married Margaret Boyden on 30 June 1926, in Winnetka, Illinois. Their children were Francis Peabody Magoun III (1927–1999; m. Faith Gowen); William Cowper Boyden Magoun (1928–2014; m. Patricia Lavezzorio); Margaret Boyden Magoun (1932–2017; m. Guido Rothrauff); and Jean Bartholow Magoun (born 1937; m. Ward Farnsworth).

== Publications ==
=== Books ===
- History of football from the beginnings to 1871. 1938. ISBN 0-384-35060-7
- Old-English anthology: translations of Old-English prose and verse 1950.
- Walter of Aquitaine; materials for the study of his legend. 1950.
- Graded Finnish reader. 1957.
- Chaucer gazetteer. 1961.
- Kalevala, or Poems of the Kaleva District. 1963. ISBN 0-674-50000-8
- The Old Kalevala and Certain Antecedents. 1969. ISBN 0-674-63235-4

He is also credited for a few other works:

- Founders of England by Francis B. Gummere. 1930.
- Anglo-Saxon reader by Milton Haight Turk. 1930. ISBN 0-674-03650-6.

=== Articles ===
- Magoun Jr., Francis P (1953). "The Oral-Formulaic Character of Anglo-Saxon Narrative Poetry". Speculum. 28 (446–67): 446–467. doi:10.2307/2847021. JSTOR 2847021. S2CID 162903356. Rpt. in Nicholson, Lewis E. (1966). An Anthology of Beowulf Criticism. Notre Dame: University of Notre Dame Press. pp. 189–221. and in Fry Jr., Donald K. (1968). The Beowulf Poet: A Collection of Critical Essays. Englewood Cliffs: Prentice-Hall. pp. 83–113.

== See also ==
- List of World War I flying aces from the United States
