= Thomas Hahn =

American professor of medieval literature and English

Thomas Hahn (born 1946) is an American professor of medieval literature and English who has taught since 1973 at the University of Rochester. After undergraduate studies at Fordham, he completed a Ph.D. at UCLA in 1974. He is especially known for his work on medieval European travel narratives, race in pre-modern Europe, and the modern reception of Robin Hood. He has advised over three dozen Ph.D. students during his fifty years at Rochester. Hahn's interest in medieval English literature, as well as its intersection with popular culture, is reflected both in his publications and in the conferences he has organized.

== Career ==
Becoming an assistant professor of English at the University of Rochester in 1973, Hahn was promoted to associate professor in 1979 and full professor in 1993.

Hahn edited a collection of the medieval poems about Sir Gawain for the TEAMS Middle English Texts Series, Sir Gawain: Eleven Romances and Tales, in 1995. His work with the Middle English Texts Series and the Chaucer Bibliographies has been supported with grants from the National Endowment for the Humanities.

Hahn was the editor of Robin Hood in Popular Culture: Violence, Transgression, and Justice. The book published conference proceedings from a 1997 conference at Rochester that was billed as the first devoted entirely to Robin Hood and related characters. He also co-edited a festschrift for Russell Peck, Retelling Tales: Essays in Honor of Russell Peck; and has been a leading contributor to advances in digital projects at the University's Rossell Hope Robbins Library. Most recently, he edited a volume of essays titled A Cultural History of Race in the Middle Ages, the second volume of a six-volume series.

In 2022, Hahn was honored with a festschrift co-edited by former Ph.D. students Valerie Johnson and Kara McShane entitled Negotiating Boundaries in Medieval Literature and Culture: Essays on Marginality, Difference, and Reading Practices in Honor of Thomas Hahn.
