= Talbot Shrewsbury Book =

15th-century manuscript

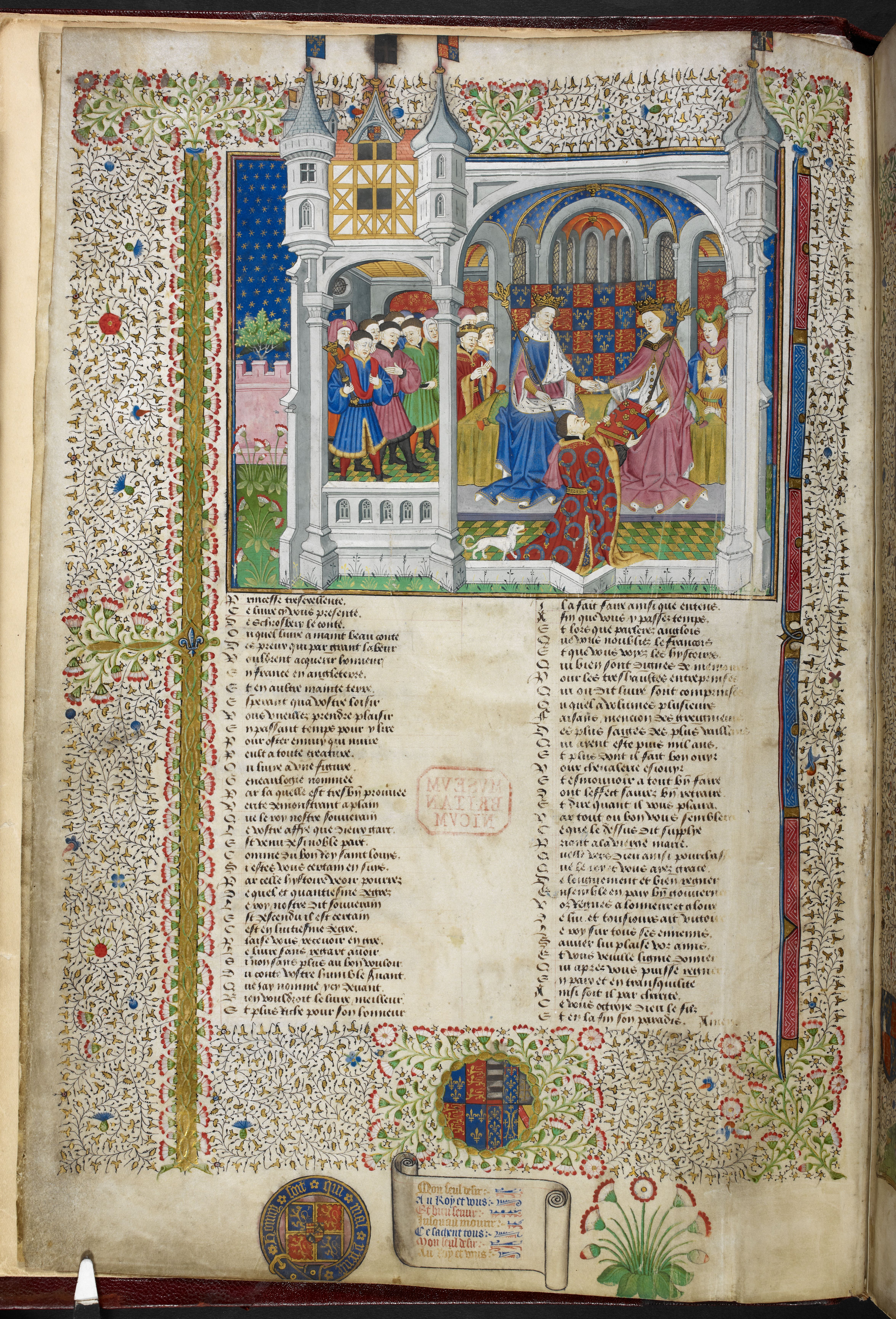
Presentation page from the Talbot Shrewsbury Book with dedicatory verse under an illuminated miniature of John Talbot, 1st Earl of Shrewsbury (identified by his Talbot dog), presenting the book to Queen Margaret of Anjou seated beside King Henry VI, Royal MS 15 E VI f. 2v

The Talbot Shrewsbury Book (British Library Royal 15 E vi) is a very large richly-illuminated manuscript made in Rouen (Normandy) in 1444/5. It was presented by John Talbot, 1st Earl of Shrewsbury (d. 1453) to the French princess, Margaret of Anjou (b. 1430, d. 1482), in honour of her betrothal to King Henry VI (r. 1422-1461). It contains a unique collection of fifteen texts in French, including chansons de geste, chivalric romances, treatises on warfare and chivalry, and finally the Statutes of the Order of the Garter. The work is an excellent example of book production in Rouen in the mid-fifteenth century and provides a rare insight into the political views of the English military leader and close confidant of the crown, John Talbot.

== Contents ==
Following the two-page presentation miniature and dedication, tales of heroes and heroines of the past, both real and imaginary, in the form of chansons de geste (verse epics), and chivalric romances fill two-thirds of the volume. The final third contains more didactic material: chronicles, instructional manuals and statutes. Each text, preceded by a large image, begins on a new folio in a separate gathering. All were bound together in a single volume, with a list of contents on the verso of the first folio.

Two of the greatest heroes of the past, Alexander the Great and Charlemagne are the subject of the first six texts in the collection:

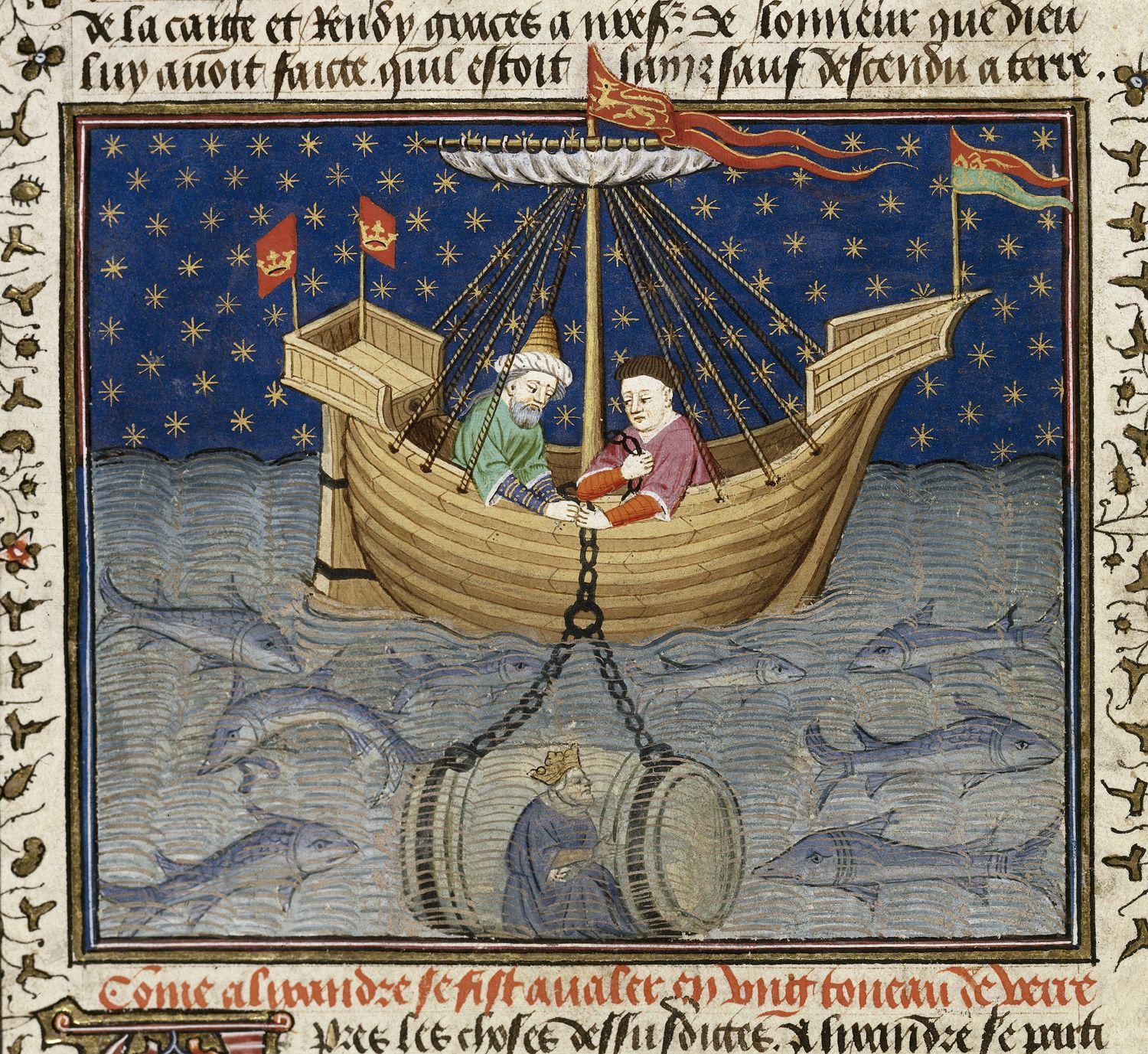
Alexander the Great in a barrel submarine – British Library Royal MS 15 E vi f20v (detail)

=== Alexander the Great ===
The Roman d'Alexandre en prose (ff. 5-24v) is a thirteenth-century French version of the Historia de preliis (a Latin translation of the original Greek legend of Alexander, falsely attributed to Callisthenes). Alexander the Great is portrayed as the ultimate hero who conquers the known world, battles flying dragons, meets Amazonian women and horned men, and is lowered into the sea in a cask. Included here are tales of his childhood and legendary education by Aristotle, the murder of his mother, Olympias, and details of his successors. Eighty-one colourful miniatures illustrate Alexander's adventures.

=== Charlemagne ===
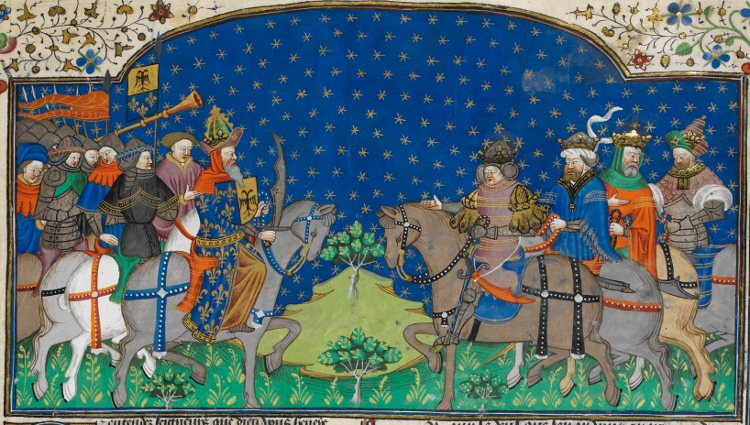
Charlemagne and four kings - British Library Royal MS 15 E vi f25r (detail)

The following five tales are set in the time of Charlemagne, the great military hero and Holy Roman emperor, whose reign provides the background to a huge epic cycle involving a plethora of subsidiary characters. The first four texts are in the form of chansons de geste and the fifth is a prose romance.

Simon de Pouille relates the events in the war between Charlemagne and Christian Jerusalem on the one side and Jonas of Babylon, on the other. Simon, one of the emperor's companions, is sent as an envoy to the Saracen leader, a task fraught with difficulties. Two other manuscripts of this work are in the Bibliothèque nationale de France: Paris, Bibliothèque nationale de France, nouvelles acquisitions françaises, 4780 and Paris, Bibliothèque nationale de France, français, 368, ff. 140r-160v.

Aspremont tells of Charlemagne's campaigns in Italy. Aspremont is one of the peaks in the southern Apennines through which the army advances on the way to Rome.

Fierebras is the tale of Charlemagne's battles with the Saracens and of the encounter between his army and Fierebras of Alexander, in which the Crown of Thorns and other relics are recaptured for the Christians.

Ogier le Danois links the tales of Charlemagne with Arthurian legends, as common characters and places are introduced. Ogier, the Danish hero and enemy of Charlemagne, marries an English princess and becomes King of England, bearing a son by Morgan le Fee while he is shipwrecked on Avalon.

Quatre fils Aimon or Le livre de Renault de Montauban tells the story of four brothers who flee from persecution by Charlemagne, going on a crusade on Bayard, the magic horse. Renault eventually becomes a stonemason at the cathedral in Cologne and after his death his body develops miraculous properties.

=== Other romances ===
Two prose romances of Anglo-Norman origin and a chanson follow:

Pontus et Sidoine, adapted from the French version of the Anglo-Norman romance, King Horn, tells the story of the son of the King of Galicia and the daughter of the King of Brittany and their love for one another. A tale of chivalry as well as a moral treatise, it glorifies peace as a worthy aim for all, even knights and soldiers.

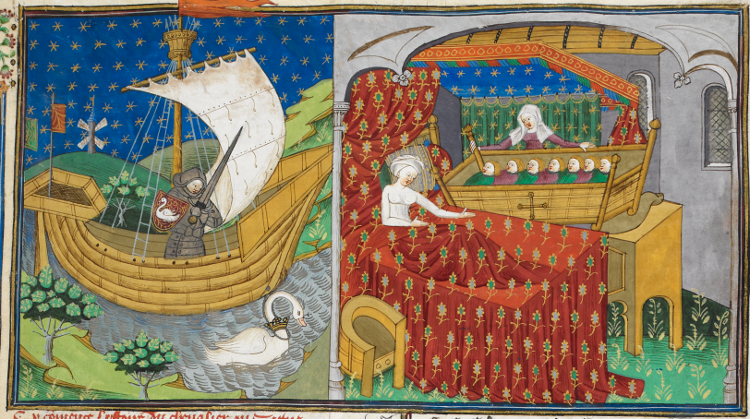
The Knight of the Swan, British Library Royal MS 15 E vi f273r (detail)

Le Romant de Guy de Warwik (Guy of Warwick) et d’Heraud d’Ardenne, was one of the most popular romances in medieval England, judging from the number of copies that survive in both French and Middle English, mostly in verse. There are, however, only two known copies in French prose, of which this is one. Guy is an English knight who falls in love with a lady of high standing and must prove himself worthy to win her hand. He is taught chivalry by his foster-father, Heraud, and embarks on a series of successful adventures, but later comes to regret his violent past and goes on a crusade, then retires to a hermitage.

The last romance in the collection is a chanson called Lystoire du chevalier au Cygne, an abridged version of part of the vast Crusade cycle. The tale of the seven children turned to swans and of Hélias, the Knight of the Swan, was linked to the legendary origins of Godefroi de Bouillon, one of the leaders of the First Crusade (1096), who became the first ruler of the Crusader Kingdom of Jerusalem.

=== Didactic texts ===
The remainder of the manuscript (from folio 293 onwards) contains texts which are more didactic in nature, perhaps intended for the instruction of Margaret of Anjou or of her future sons and heirs. There are three works on chivalry and warfare, an instructional manual for kings and princes, a chronicle and statutes.

Larbre des batailles is a treatise on war and the laws of battle, written for a wide audience in the style of a scholastic dialogue; a question is posed, both sides are debated and a conclusion follows.

Le gouvernement des roys et des princes is translated from Gilles de Rome's De regimine principium, the 'Mirror of Princes', an influential text which interpreted (sometimes loosely) and promoted Aristotle's political and moral philosophy to a medieval audience. It combined practical advice with philosophical guidance for rulers. There is a further copy of this text in the Bibliothèque nationale de France, Arsenal, 2690.

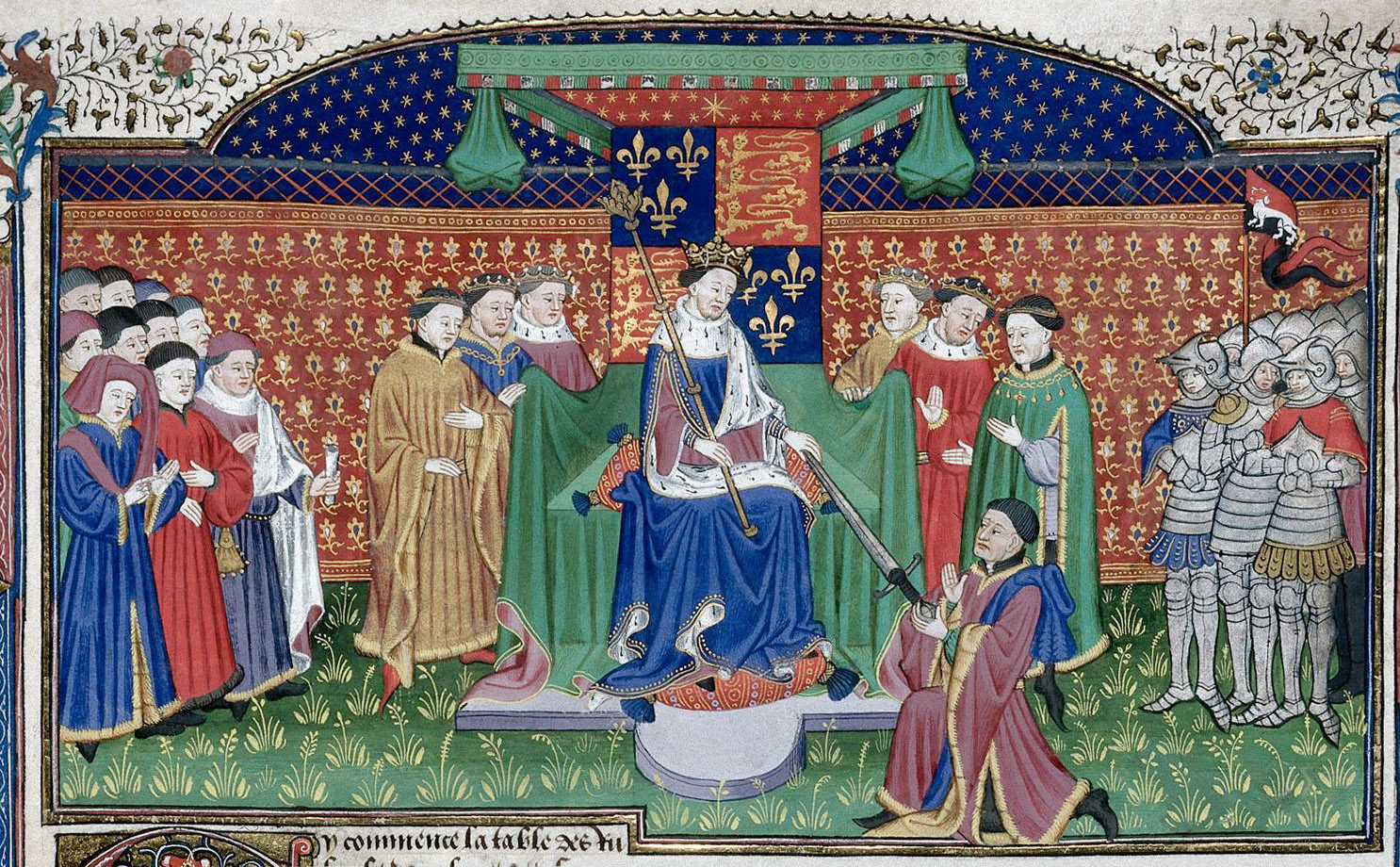
Henry VI appointing Talbot as Constable of France – British Library Royal MS 15 E vi f405r (detail)

Chroniques de Normandie is a history of the region from the 8th century to 1217. It begins in the time of the legendary Aubert and his son Robert le Diable, during the reign of Pepin, father of Charlemagne, the early part up to 1189 being a prose version of Wace's Roman de Rou. The sources of the continuation from 1189 onwards have not been established beyond doubt, though there are parallels with other chronicles of the period such as Ralph of Coggeshall and Matthew Paris. Other copies of the text are in British Library, Additional MS 20811, British Library, Cotton. Vitellius F. xvi (partly burnt, extends to 1199 only), British Library, Royal MS 19 B. xiv, Bibliothèque Saint-Geneviève, MS 805, and Bibliothèque nationale de France, MS Français 5388.

Breviaire des Nobles is a poem on the values of chivalry by Alain Chartier, beginning 'Je Noblesce, dame de bon vouloir...'.

Le livre des fais darmes et de chevalerie is a work on military strategy and the conduct of war, compiled by its author, Christine de Pizan in 1410, from a variety of sources, both ancient and contemporary, for the instruction of young knights. Although as a woman she had no direct experience of fighting, she succeeds here in producing an authoritative work on the subject, worthy to be translated and printed by Caxton in 1489. It also survives in over 15 manuscripts.

The Statutes of the Order of the Garter (here written in French) are the rules for the government and organisation of the chivalric order founded by Edward III in the late 1340s. The original statutes do not survive and this version is slightly different from the four early texts which were printed by Ashmole in his comprehensive work on the subject in the 17th century. Included are rules pertaining to foreign travel by members of the Order, to uniforms and to the guardianship of the order in the king's absence.

== Illuminations ==
=== Frontispiece ===
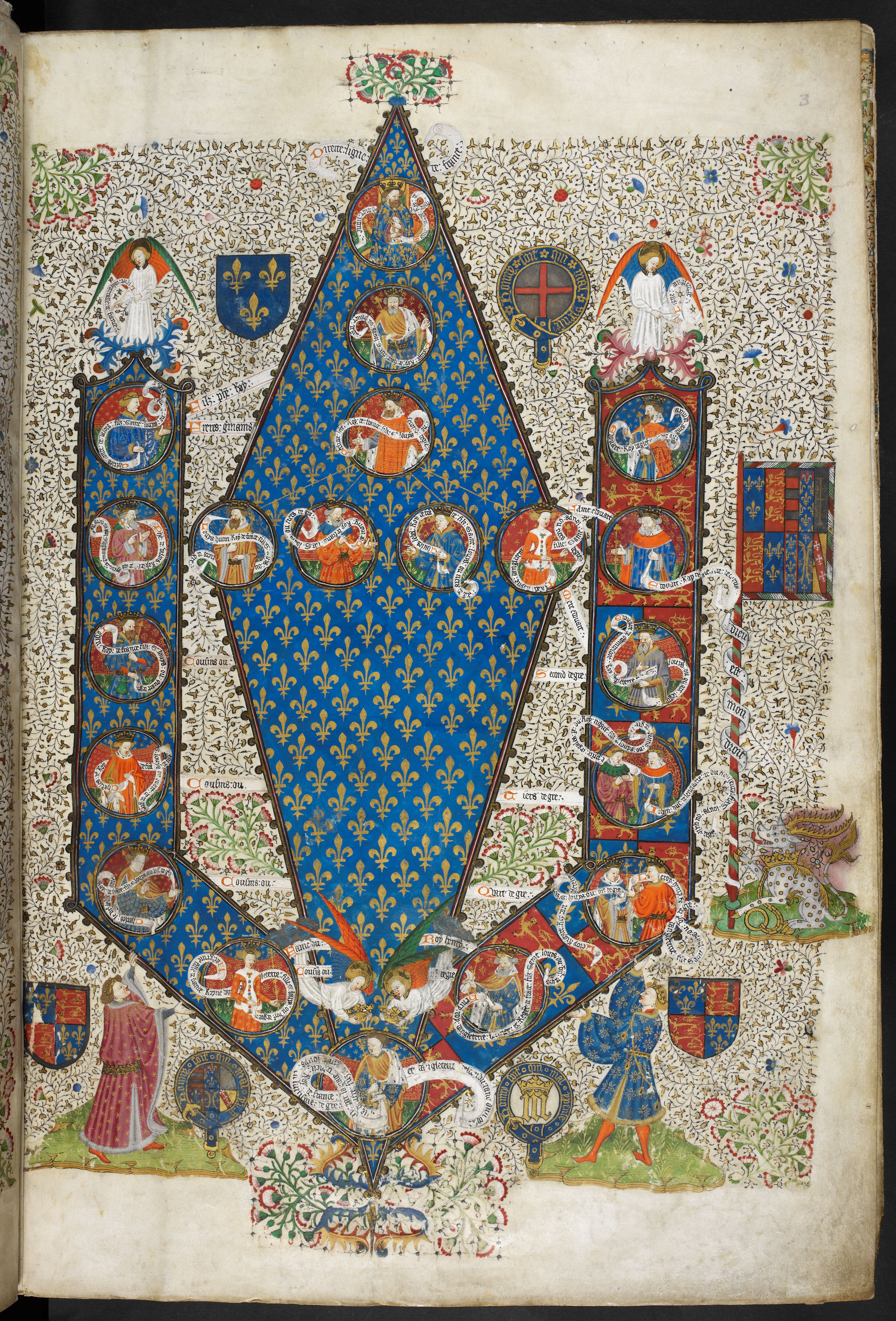
Genealogical table of descendants of Saint Louis IX. British Library Royal MS 15 E vi f3r

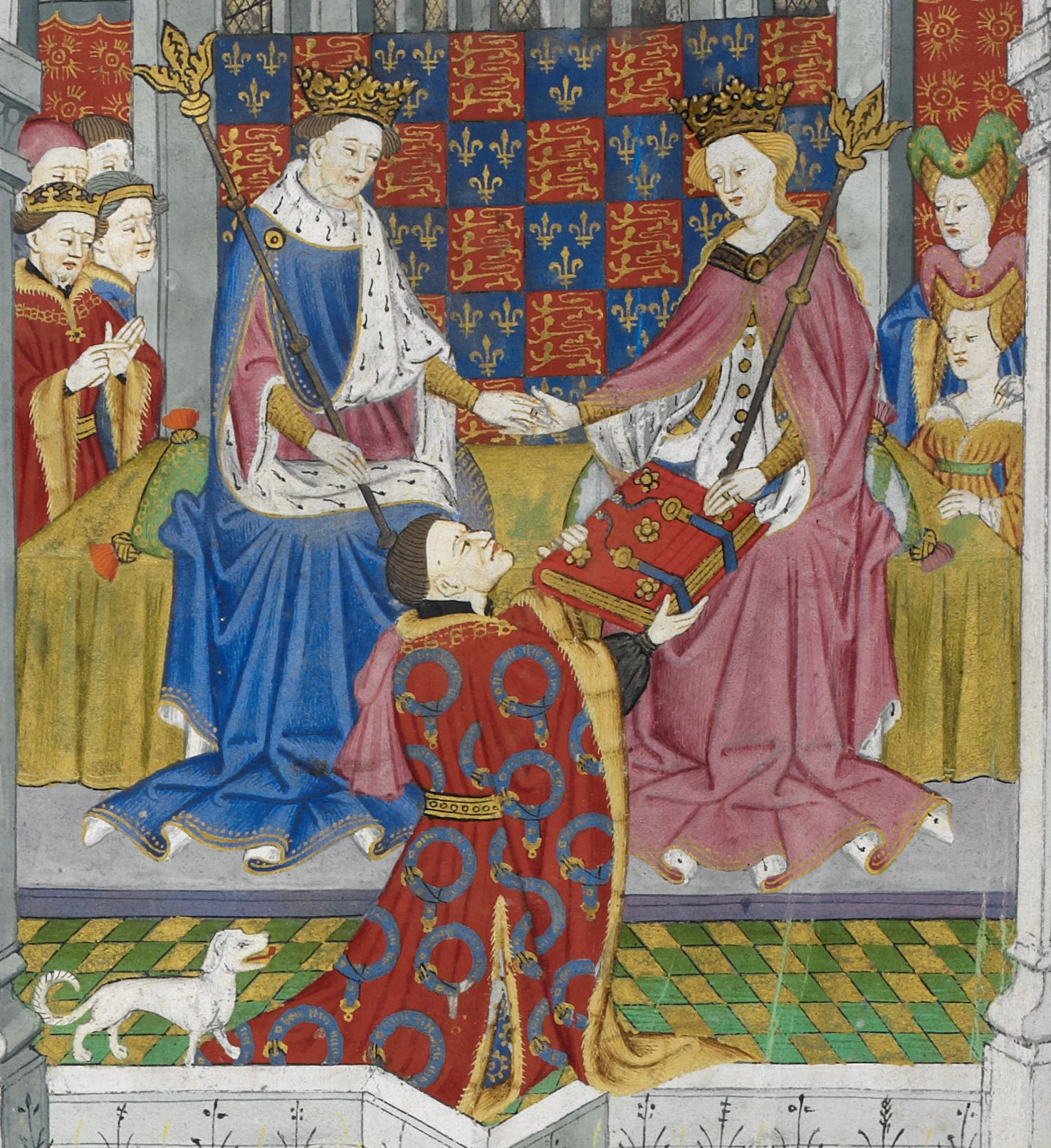
Detail of the illuminated miniature in the frontispiece showing Talbot, with his dog, presenting the book to Margaret and Henry

The Shrewsbury Book is perhaps best known for the two images that serve as a frontispiece to the volume. On back of the second page (f. 2v) is a scene of the manuscript being presented to Margaret of Anjou by John Talbot, who kneels before her, wearing a sumptuous garter robe trimmed with gold, accompanied by the white Talbot dog. The picture gives an idea of the size of the book and how it must have looked in its original binding (it is now in a modern leather binding). Margaret is shown enthroned with Henry, and crowned as the Queen of England. The dedication poem beneath begins 'Princesse tres excellente / ce livre cy vous presente / De schrosbery le conte'; the royal arms of England and Anjou are included in the borders of this and many of the full-page images which precede the texts as are daisies (marguerites) referring to her name. The colourful diagram on the facing page (f. 3r) lays out Henry VI's genealogical claim to the throne of France through his descent from Louis IX (Saint Louis, r. 1226-1270) through both the maternal and paternal lines. It is in the form of a fleur-de-lys, with portraits of kings in medallions, supported by Humphrey, duke of Gloucester with his arms and the arms of Anjou, encircled by the Garter and Richard, duke of York with his arms and an initial 'M', encircled by the Garter. On the right are the English kings including Edward II (1307-1327), with his wife Isabella of France, daughter of Charles IV of France (1322-1328) down to Henry V (1413-1422), father of Henry VI. On the left are the French Valois kings with Charles de Valois, brother of Philip IV (Philip le Bel) at the top, down to Charles VI (1380-1422), and below him, his daughter, Catherine of Valois, wife of Henry V and mother of Henry VI. Charles VII (1422-1461), son of Charles VI, is omitted from the line, (he was in fact crowned in Reims in 1429, aided by Joan of Arc in the struggle for his throne). The two lines are united in the person of Henry VI in the lower center, with two angels holding crowns above his head. The arms of France and of George, also encircled by the Garter on either side of Louis and his son, Philip III the Bold (1270-1285), and on the right is a banner bearing the royal arms of England impaled with the arms of Anjou, wrapped with a scroll inscribed with a motto 'Dieu est mon droit', and supported by the royal device of an antelope with a crown and chain. These and most of the other images in the manuscript are attributed the workshop of the Talbot Master, an artist active in Rouen, named after this manuscript and the John Talbot Book of Hours, (Cambridge, Fitzwilliam Museum, MS 40.1950).

=== Further Illuminations ===
Two other illuminators were responsible for some of the illustrations in the Alexander legend: the Master of the Lord Hoo's Book of Hours (bifolium ff. 21-24) and an artist working in the Bedford Master's style (bifolium ff. 4v, 22-23). Two later images, one of Herault d'Ardenne the other of Honoré de Bonnet, author of L'arbre des batailles (ff. 266v and 293) have been attributed to a third unknown artist.

== Ownership ==
Although the image shows Margaret of Anjou receiving the manuscript on her wedding day, it is likely that Talbot presented her with the manuscript in France, prior to her journey to England to marry the king. The presentation poem beneath the image describes her as merely affianced, not married. Scholars have questioned whether the book was originally made for Margaret of Anjou herself. The common theme of the contents is the art of chivalry, a fitting subject for a military commander such as the Talbot, Earl of Shrewsbury, who commissioned the work, but perhaps not entirely suitable for a Queen. It is therefore possible that the volume was originally conceived for Talbot himself, or for a future prince, the future male heir of Henry VI and Margaret. They had a son, Edward, in 1453, but he was killed at the Battle of Tewkesbury in 1471, and there is no record of the book's ownership from this time. During the reign of Henry VIII it was probably in the Royal library as it has been identified as 'Le bon roy Alexandre', no. 91 in the list of books at Richmond Palace of 1535. It was certainly in the catalogue of the Royal library made in 1666 during the reign of Charles II (Royal Appendix 71, f. 12v) and was presented to the British Museum by George II in 1757 as part of the Old Royal Library. It remains part of the Royal collection at the British Library.

== Sources ==
- Ashmole, Elias (1715), The History of the most Noble Order of the Garter ... Faithfully digested, and continued by Thomas Walker, London: A. Bell
- Avril, François; Reynaud, Nicole (1993), Les Manuscrits à Peintures en France 1440-1520, Paris: Flammarion
- Briggs, C.F. (1993), "'Manuscripts of Giles de Rome's ~De Regimine Principium~ in England, 1300-1500'", Scriptorium:Revue internationale des études relative aux manuscrits, 47: 60–73
- Carley, J.P., ed. (2000), The Libraries of King Henry VIII Corpus of British Medieval Library Catalogues, 7, London, pp. ?H1.91
- Cary, George (1987), The Medieval Alexander, Cambridge: Cambridge University Press, ISBN 0824077520
- Labory, G. (1997), "'Les manuscrits de la Grande Chronique de Normandie du XIVe et du Xve siècle'", Revue d'Histoire des Textes, 27 (1997): 191–222, doi:10.3406/rht.1997.1456
- Labory, G. (1998), "'Les manuscrits de la Grande Chronique de Normandie du XIVe et du Xve siècle'", Revue d'Histoire des Textes, 28 (1998): 183–233, doi:10.3406/rht.1999.1467
- Labory, G. (1999), "'Les manuscrits de la Grande Chronique de Normandie du XIVe et du Xve siècle'", Revue d'Histoire des Textes, 29 (1999): 245–294, doi:10.3406/rht.2000.1480
- Maillard, François (1948), Les traductions du "De regimine principum" de Gille de Rome, École nationale des chartes, Paris, 1948. — Résumé dans Positions des thèses de l'École des chartes
- McKendrick, Scot; Kathleen Doyle; John Lowden (2011), Royal Manuscripts, the Genius of Illumination, London: British Library, p. 401, ISBN 9780712358156
- Reynolds, Catherine (1993), "'The Shrewsbury Book, London, British Library, Royal MS 15 E VI'", Medieval Art, Architecture and Archaeology at Rouen, British Archaeological Association Conference Transactions, 12: 109–16
- Ross, D.J.A. (1985), Studies in the Alexander Romance, London: Pindar Press, ISBN 090713226X
- Scattergood, V.J. (1971), Politics and Poetry in the Fifteenth Century, London: Blandford Press, ISBN 0713736089
- Thomas, Jacques (1961), Les mises en prose de 'Renaut de Montauban': classement sommaire et sources (Fin du moyen âge et Renaissance: Mélanges offert à Robert Guiete ed.), Anvers
- Ward, H.L.D. (1883), Catalogue of Romances in the Department of Manuscripts in the British Museum, 3 vols, vol. 1, London: British Museum
