= Roman d'Alexandre en prose =

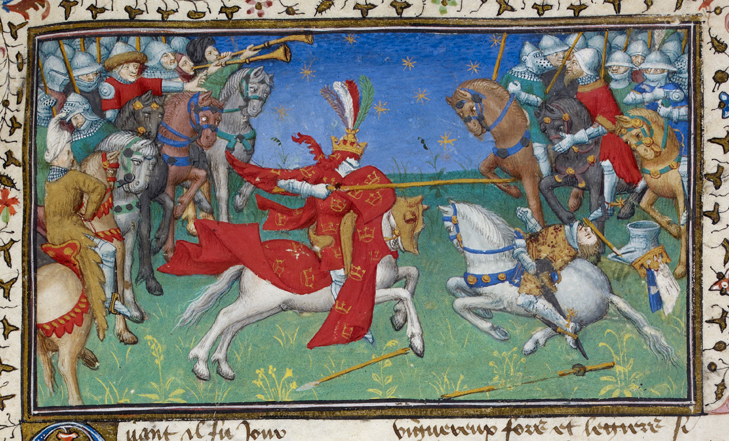
Alexander unhorsing Porrus, the King of India (BL Royal MS B xx, c. 1420)

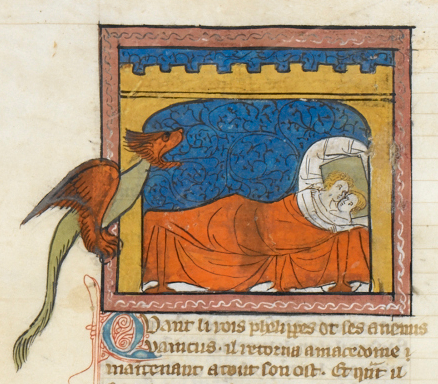
Olympias and Nectanabus conceive Alexander (Royal MS 19 D i, c. 1340)

The Roman d'Alexandre en prose (Prose Alexander-Romance) is one of many medieval "Alexander romances" relating the adventures of Alexander the Great, which were by then greatly elaborated with fantastical additions to the historical accounts. Alexander was one of the medieval "Nine Worthies," and his journeys eastward—and most especially the strange and exotic people and animals he encountered there—were treated in a number of different texts in a variety of genres. Based on the relatively large number of surviving manuscripts, as well as the deluxe quality of many of these productions, the Old French Roman d'Alexandre en prose can be considered the most popular and successful vernacular prose treatment of the legend.

== Origins ==
In the mid-tenth century, Archpriest Leo of Naples translated into Latin a second-century Greek Alexander romance falsely attributed to Callisthenes. This new translation was later supplemented by other material (from sources including Orosius's Historia adversus paganos) and, in its expanded form, came to be known as the Historia de preliis. It is this Latin version that was, in its turn, freely translated into the Old French text known as the Roman d'Alexandre en prose (Alexander Romance in Prose), borrowing at times from other sources, including the verse Roman d'Alexandre. The prose romance dates to the thirteenth century. There are three major recensions of the text, where subsequent editors either added supplements or made excisions.

== Plot ==
Nectanebus the magician and astrologer is the king of Egypt, but the country is attacked by the Persians and Nectanebus is sent into exile. He finds a new home at the court of Philip, the king of Macedon. The king is away, leaving his wife Olympias behind. Nectanebus prophesies to Olympias that the god Amon will visit her in a dream, and conceive a son. Nectanebus himself then proceeds to make the prediction true by coming to the queen at night disguised as a dragon. The queen becomes pregnant, and is initially concerned about the anger of Philip when he returns. But Philip has himself had a prophetic dream, foretelling that his wife will give birth to a boy, conceived by a god, who will go on to be a great conqueror. He therefore accepts the illegitimate child as his own.

As the young Alexander grows older, however, this uneasy situation grows unstable. While stargazing, Alexander pushes Nectanebus into a ditch and the magician is killed, and, as he is dying, reveals to Alexander his true parentage. After Alexander is knighted by Philip, he tames the horse Bucephalus, and departs on his first military expedition. He conquers Nicholas, king of the Aridians, and is crowned their king. When he returns to Macedonia, however, he finds that in his absence Philip has set Olympias aside and is about to marry another. After an altercation, in which Alexander kills Lycias, one of Philip's courtiers, Philip is ultimately reconciled with Olympias.

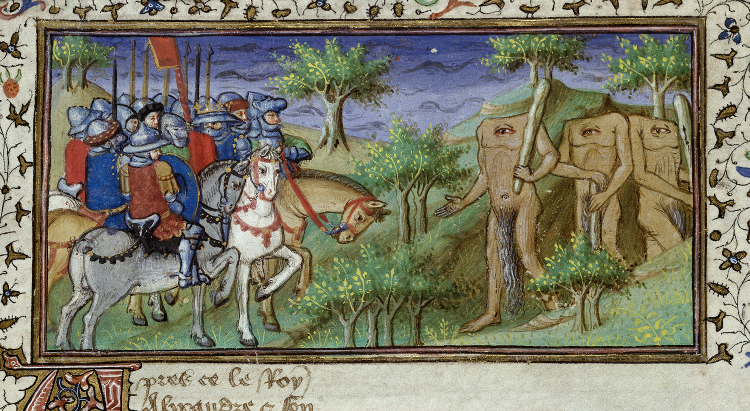
Alexander encounters the Blemmyae, who have their faces on their chests (BL Royal MS 20 B xx, c. 1420)

Alexander then embarks on a military campaign in Armenia. While he is away, Pausania, the king of Bithynia and one of Philip's vassals, rebels, and Philip is mortally wounded. Alexander returns in time to kill Pausania and avenge his father. He succeeds as king of Macedonia, and embarks on a tour of conquest around the Mediterranean, which includes the founding of Alexandria in Egypt.

Alexander then turns his attention to Persia: the king, Darius, has sent him a challenge, and he replies with an invasion. After a protracted campaign, Darius is killed by treachery from within his own family. Alexander weeps over his fallen foe, buries the king honorably, and sentences the traitors to death. He then marries Darius's daughter, Roxane.

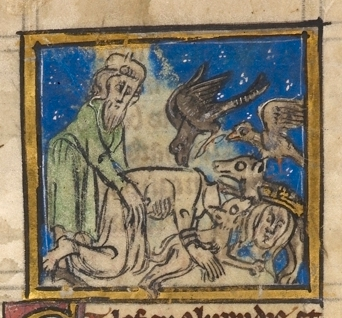
The dead Olympias is thrown to the dogs (BL Harley MS 4979, c. 1300-25)

Meanwhile, Darius's old ally, Porrus, the king of India, still threatens, and Alexander sets out further eastward. Along the way he encounters many strange and exotic people and animals—this part of the narrative participates heavily in the 'Wonders of the East' genre of medieval literature. He kills Porrus, but continues on, encountering more and more strange creatures and peoples, including Queen Candace. When he reaches the end of the earth, he embarks on further missions of exploration. He orders a contraption to be built that is lifted into the air by griffons, enabling him to fly up into the air. Then he orders a sort of submarine to be made out of glass, enabling him to explore under the sea. He sends back letters to his mother and to Aristotle, describing his deeds.

Alexander conquers Babylon, and throws a great celebration. During the feast, he is poisoned by Jobas, the son of Antipater, king of Tyre. After his death, there is a falling-out among his heirs. Olympias is killed by Cassander, another of Antipater's sons, and her body thrown to the dogs. Roxane is imprisoned along with Ercules, Alexander's son.

== Manuscripts ==
The romance is recorded in seventeen manuscripts (one of them a fragment and another destroyed), of which ten are extensively illustrated. A further four manuscripts, including the fragment, have spaces left for miniatures that were never filled in. The manuscripts are:

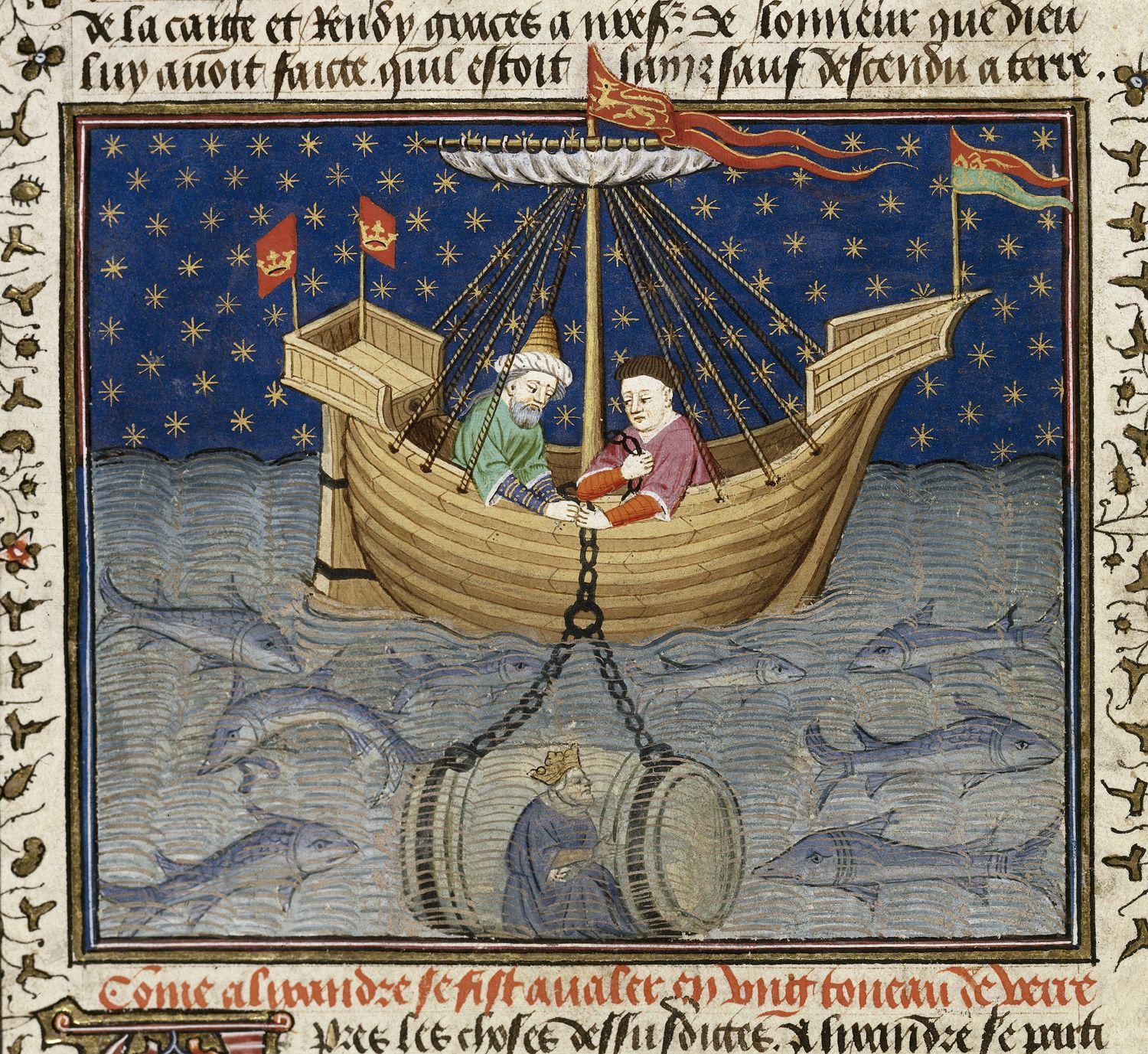
Alexander explores the sea in a submarine (BL Royal MS 15 E vi, c. 1445)

1. Berlin, Königliches Kupferstichkabinett, 78, C.I. (Early fourteenth century).
2. Br: Brussels, Bibliothèque Royale, 11040. (Late fourteenth century).
3. C: Chantilly, Musée Condé, 651. (Late fifteenth century).
4. L: Le Mans, Bibliothèque de la Ville, 103. (Late fourteenth century).
5. R^{1}: London, British Library, Royal 15. E. vi - the Talbot Shrewsbury Book. (Rouen, after 1445).
6. R^{2}: London, British Library, Royal 19. D. i. (Paris, mid-fourteenth century).
7. R^{3}: London, British Library, Royal 20. A. v. (Late thirteenth century).
8. R^{4}: London, British Library, Royal 20. B. xx. (Paris, early fifteenth century).
9. H: London, British Library, Harley 4979. (Netherlands, late thirteenth or early fourteenth century).
10. P^{1}: Paris, Bibliothèque Nationale, fr. 788. (1461).
11. P^{2}: Paris, Bibliothèque Nationale, fr. 1373. (Fifteenth century).
12. P^{3}: Paris, Bibliothèque Nationale, fr. 1385. (Fourteenth century).
13. P^{4}: Paris, Bibliothèque Nationale, fr. 1418. (Fifteenth century).
14. P^{5}: Paris, Bibliothèque Nationale, fr. 10468. (Fifteenth century).
15. S: Stockholm, Royal Library, French MS Vu.20 (olim 51). (Late fourteenth century).
16. T: Tours, Bibliothèque Municipale, 984. (Fourteenth Century). Destroyed during World War II.
17. O: Oxford, Bodleian Library, Rawlinson D. 913 (olim 1370), ff. 103-5 (fragment). (Fourteenth century).

The text also survives in ten early printed editions from the sixteenth and early seventeenth centuries, of which the oldest was published in Paris in 1506.

== Editions ==
- Hilka, Alfons (1920). Der altfranzösiche Prosa-Alexanderroman. Halle: Niemeyer.
- Otaka, Yorio; Fukui, Hideka; Ferlampin-Archer, Christine (2008). Roman d'Alexandre en Prose: [British Library, Royal 15. E. vi]. [Osaka]: Centre de la recherche interculturelle à l'Université Otemae. ISBN 9784990428709.
