= Henry VI of England =

King of England (r. 1422–1461; 1470–1471)

Henry VI
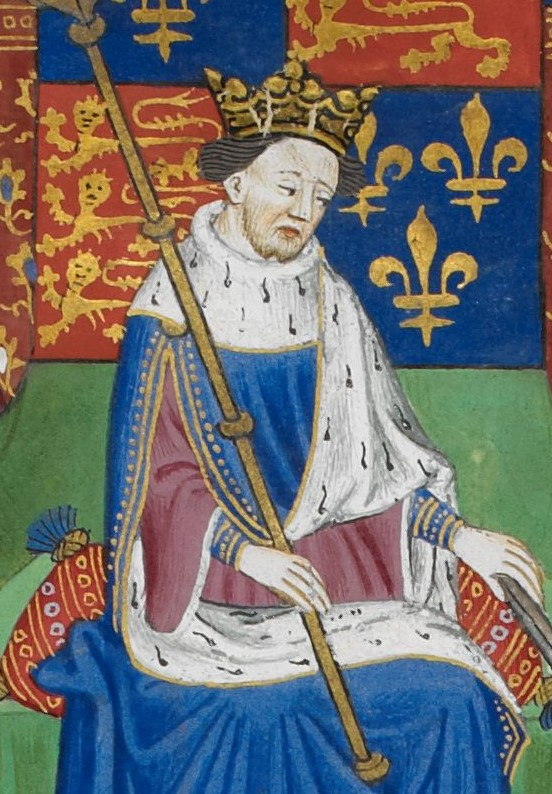
- Miniature in the Talbot Shrewsbury Book, 1444–1445

King of England
- 1st reign: 1 September 1422 – 4 March 1461
- 2nd reign: 3 October 1470 – 11 April 1471
- Coronation: 6 November 1429; Westminster Abbey
- Predecessor: Henry V
- Successor: Edward IV
- Regents: See list: Humphrey, Duke of Gloucester (1422‍–‍1429) Cardinal Henry Beaufort (1422‍–‍1437) Richard, Duke of York (1454‍–‍1455, 1455‍–‍1456, 1460)

King of France
- Reign: 21 October 1422 – 19 October 1453
- Coronation: 16 December 1431; Notre-Dame de Paris
- Predecessor: Charles VI
- Successor: Charles VII
- Regent: John, Duke of Bedford (1422‍–‍1435)
- Contender: Charles VII
- Born: 6 December 1421; Windsor Castle, Berkshire, England
- Died: 21 May 1471 (aged 49); Tower of London, London, England
- Burial: 1471; Chertsey Abbey, Surrey, England; 12 August 1484; St George's Chapel, Windsor Castle, England
- Spouse: Margaret of Anjou (m. 1445)
- Issue: Edward of Westminster, Prince of Wales
- House: Lancaster
- Father: Henry V of England
- Mother: Catherine of Valois

Henry VI (6 December 1421 – 21 May 1471) was King of England from 1422 to 1461 and again from 1470 to 1471, and claimant to the French throne from 1422 to 1453 under the terms of the Treaty of Troyes. He became king of England at the age of nine months, following the death of his father, Henry V, and inherited the French claim upon the death of his maternal grandfather, Charles VI of France.

Henry VI's claim to the French throne was increasingly challenged during the later stages of the Hundred Years' War, and by 1453 English authority there had collapsed entirely. His reign in England was marked by weak royal authority, factional conflict among the nobility, and a prolonged period of mental incapacity beginning in 1453, which contributed significantly to political instability and the outbreak of the Wars of the Roses.

Henry was born during the Hundred Years' War (1337–1453). He is the only English monarch to have been crowned King of France, following his coronation at Notre-Dame de Paris in 1431 as Henry II. His early reign, when England was ruled by a regency government, saw the pinnacle of English power in France. However, setbacks followed once he assumed full control in 1437. The young king faced military reversals in France, as well as political and financial crises in England, where divisions among the nobility in his government began to widen. His reign saw the near total loss of English lands in France.

In contrast to his father, Henry VI was described as timid, passive, benevolent and averse to warfare and violence. In 1445, Henry married Charles VII's niece Margaret of Anjou in the hope of achieving peace. However, the peace policy failed and war recommenced. By 1453, Calais was the only English-governed territory on the continent. Henry's domestic popularity declined in the 1440s, and political unrest in England grew as a result. Because of military defeats and political crises, Henry suffered a mental breakdown in 1453, triggering a power struggle between the royal family; Richard, 3rd Duke of York; Edmund Beaufort, 2nd Duke of Somerset; and Queen Margaret. Civil war broke out in 1455, leading to a long period of dynastic conflict known as the Wars of the Roses (1455–1487).

Henry was deposed in March 1461 by York's eldest son, who took the throne as Edward IV. Henry was captured by Edward's forces in 1465 and imprisoned in the Tower of London. Henry was restored to the throne by Richard Neville, 16th Earl of Warwick ("Warwick the Kingmaker") in 1470. However, in 1471, Edward retook power, killing Henry's only son, Edward of Westminster at the Battle of Tewkesbury, and imprisoning Henry once again. Henry died two weeks later in the Tower in May 1471, possibly killed on the orders of King Edward. He was buried at Chertsey Abbey and moved to Windsor Castle in 1484. He left a legacy of educational institutions, having founded Eton College, King's College, Cambridge, and All Souls College, Oxford. William Shakespeare wrote a trilogy of plays about his life, depicting him as weak-willed and easily influenced by his wife.

== Child king ==
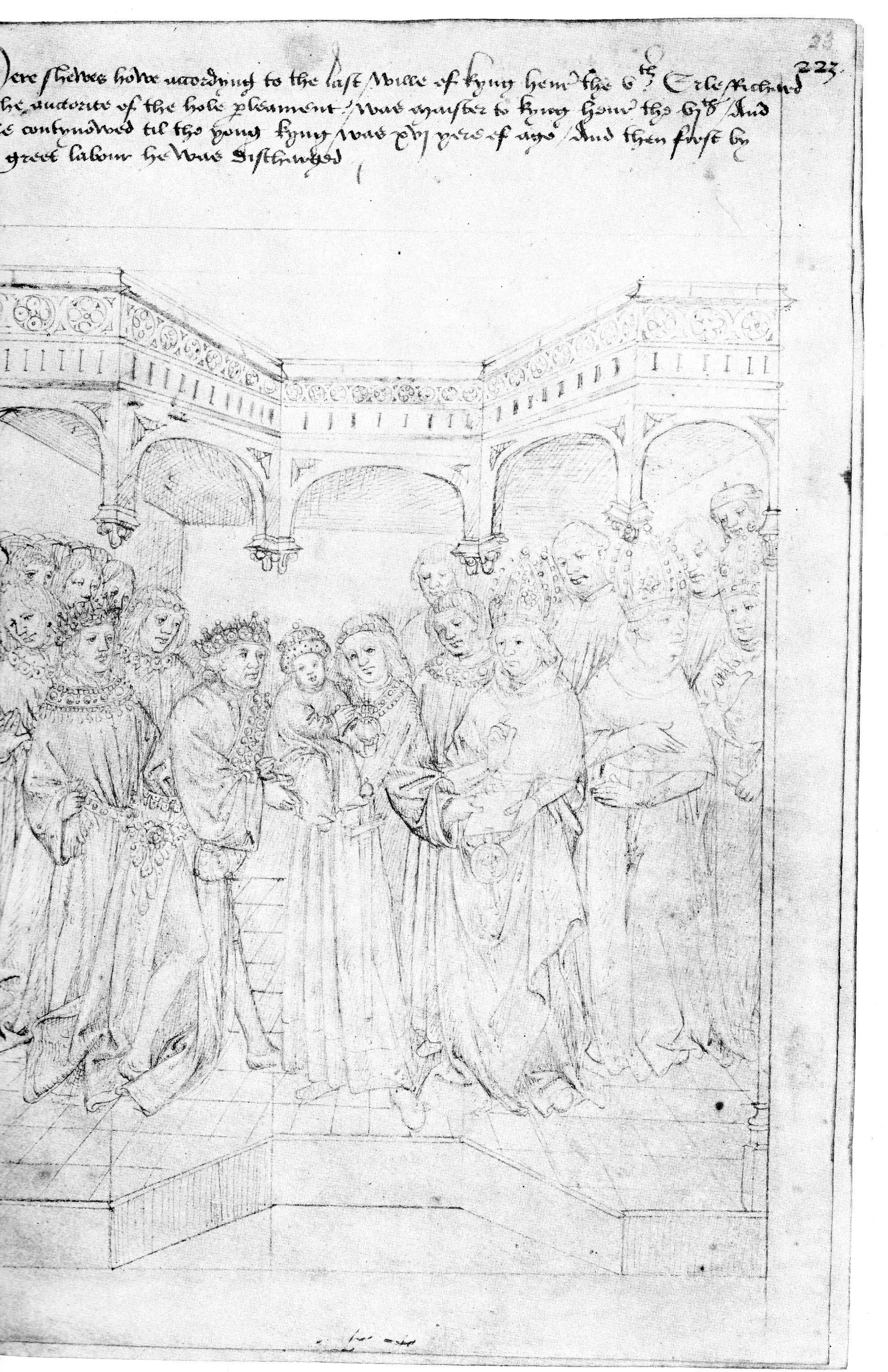
Henry VI upon his accession, shown being placed in the care of the Earl of Warwick

Henry was born on 6 December 1421 at Windsor Castle, the only child and heir-apparent of King Henry V. He succeeded to the throne as King of England at the age of eight months on 1 September 1422, the day after his father's death; he remains the youngest person ever to succeed to the English throne. On 21 October 1422, in accordance with the Treaty of Troyes of 1420, he became titular King of France upon his grandfather Charles VI's death. His mother, the 20-year-old Catherine of Valois, was viewed with considerable suspicion by English nobles as Charles VI's daughter. She was prevented from playing a full role in her son's upbringing.

On 28 September 1423, the nobles swore loyalty to Henry VI, who was not yet two years old. They summoned Parliament in the King's name and established a regency council to govern until the King should come of age. One of Henry V's surviving brothers, John, Duke of Bedford, was appointed senior regent of the realm and was in charge of the ongoing war in France. During Bedford's absence, the government of England was headed by Henry V's other surviving brother, Humphrey, Duke of Gloucester, who was appointed Lord Protector and Defender of the Realm. His duties were limited to keeping the peace and summoning Parliament. Henry V's uncle Henry Beaufort, Bishop of Winchester (after 1426 also Cardinal), had an important place on the council. After the Duke of Bedford died in 1435, the Duke of Gloucester claimed the Regency himself but was contested by the other members of the council.

From 1428, Henry's tutor was Richard de Beauchamp, Earl of Warwick, whose father had been instrumental in the opposition to Richard II's reign. For the period 1430–1432, Henry was also tutored by the physician John Somerset. Somerset's duties were to "tutor the young king as well as preserv[e] his health". Somerset remained within the royal household until early 1451 after the English House of Commons petitioned for his removal because of his "dangerous and subversive influence over Henry VI".

Henry's mother Catherine remarried to Owen Tudor and had two sons by him, Edmund and Jasper. Henry later gave his half-brothers earldoms. Edmund then fathered the future King Henry VII of England.

In reaction to the coronation of Charles VII of France in Reims Cathedral on 17 July 1429, Henry was soon crowned King of England at Westminster Abbey on 6 November 1429, aged 7, followed by his own coronation as King of France at Notre-Dame de Paris on 16 December 1431, aged 10. He was the only English king to be crowned king in both England and France. It was shortly after his crowning ceremony at Merton Priory on All Saints' Day, 1 November 1437, shortly before his 16th birthday, that he obtained some measure of independent authority. This was confirmed on 13 November 1437, but his growing willingness to involve himself in administration had already become apparent in 1434, when the place named on writs temporarily changed from Westminster (where the Privy Council met) to Cirencester (where the King resided). He finally assumed full royal powers when he came of age at the end of the year 1437, when he turned 16 years old. Henry's assumption of full royal powers occurred during the Great Bullion Famine and the beginning of the Great Slump in England.

== Assumption of government ==
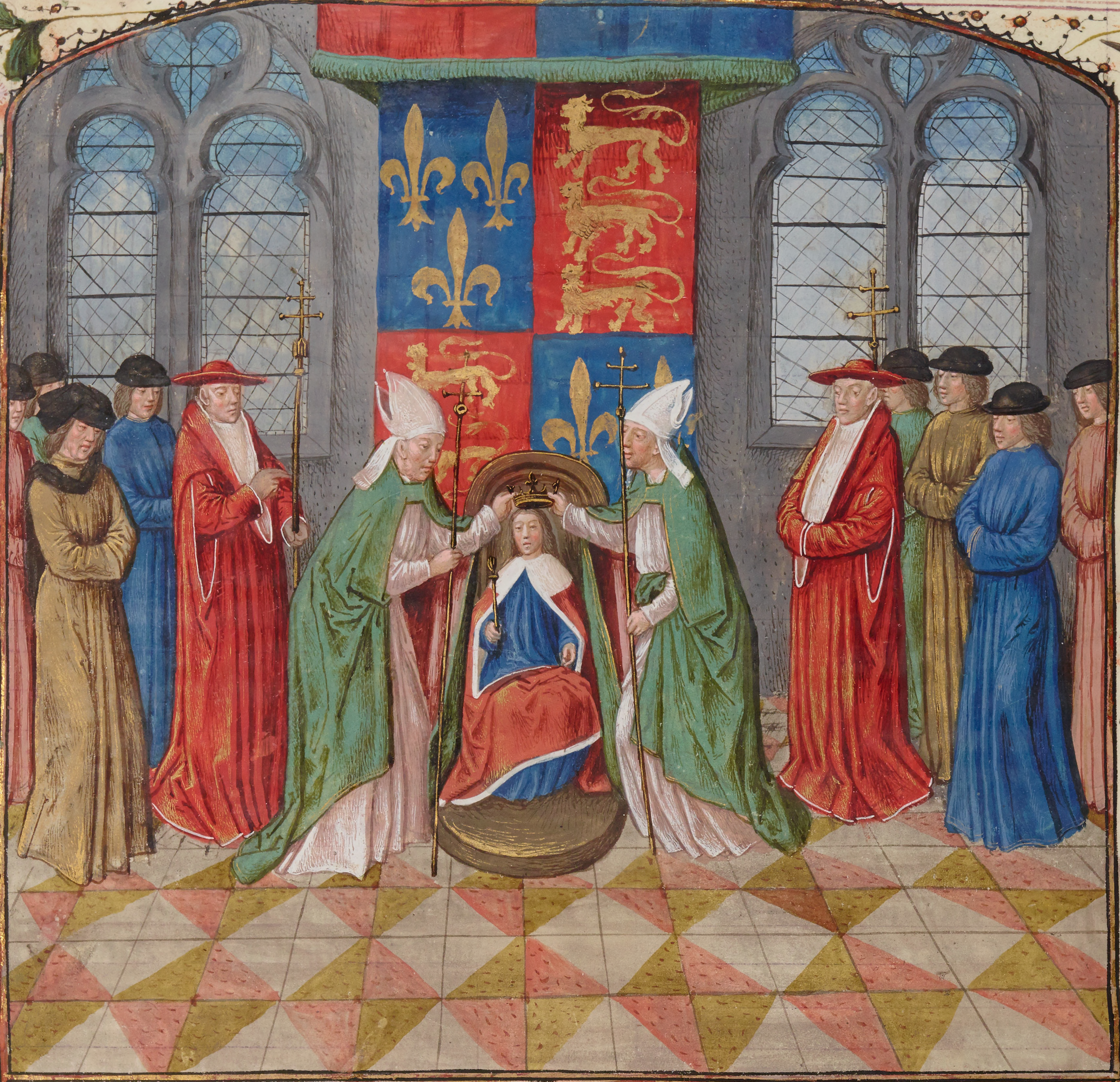
A mid-15th-century depiction of Henry being crowned King of France at Notre-Dame de Paris on 16 December 1431

Henry, who was by nature shy, pious, and averse to deceit and bloodshed, immediately allowed his court to be dominated by a few noble favourites who clashed on the matter of the French war when he assumed the reins of government in 1437. After the death of King Henry V, England had lost momentum in the Hundred Years' War, whereas the House of Valois had gained ground beginning with Joan of Arc's military victories in the year 1429. The young King came to favour a policy of peace in France and thus favoured the faction around Cardinal Beaufort and William de la Pole, Earl of Suffolk, who thought likewise; Humphrey, Duke of Gloucester and Richard, Duke of York, who argued for a continuation of the war, were ignored.

== Marriage ==
As the English military situation in France deteriorated, talks emerged in England about arranging a marriage for the king to strengthen England's foreign connections and facilitate a peace between the warring parties. In 1434, the English council suggested that peace with the Scots could best be effected by the wedding of Henry to one of the daughters of King James I of Scotland; the proposal came to nothing. During the Congress of Arras in 1435, the English put forth the idea of a union between Henry and a daughter of King Charles VII of France, but the Armagnacs refused even to contemplate the suggestion unless Henry renounced his claim to the French throne. Another proposal in 1438 to a daughter of King Albert II of Germany likewise failed.

Better prospects for England arose amid a growing effort by French lords to resist the growing power of the French monarchy, a conflict which culminated in the Praguerie revolt of 1440. Though the English failed to take advantage of the Praguerie itself, the prospect of gaining the allegiance of one of Charles VII's more rebellious nobles was attractive from a military perspective. In about 1441, the recently ransomed Charles, Duke of Orléans, in an attempt to force Charles VII to make peace with the English, suggested a marriage between Henry VI and Isabella of Armagnac, daughter of John IV, Count of Armagnac, a powerful noble in southwestern France who was at odds with the Valois crown. An alliance with Armagnac would have helped to protect English Gascony from increasing French threats in the region, especially in the face of defections to the enemy by local English vassals, and might have helped to wean some other French nobles to the English party. The proposal was seriously entertained between 1441 and 1443, but a massive French campaign in 1442 against Gascony disrupted the work of the ambassadors and frightened the Count of Armagnac into reluctance. The deal fell through due to problems in commissioning portraits of the Count's daughters and the Count's imprisonment by Charles VII's men in 1443.

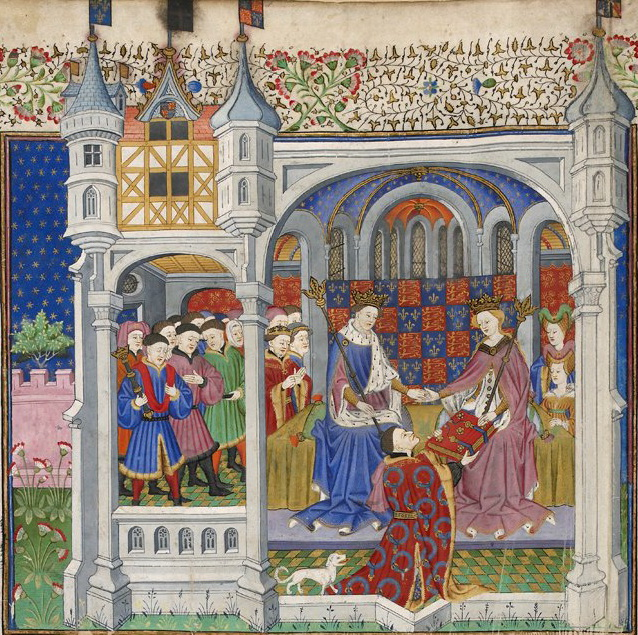
Henry VI with his wife, Queen Margaret of Anjou, receiving the book from Earl of Shrewsbury, as depicted in the Talbot Shrewsbury Book, 1444–45

Cardinal Beaufort and the Duke of Suffolk persuaded Henry that the best way to pursue peace with France was through a marriage with Margaret of Anjou, the niece of King Charles VII. Henry agreed, especially when he heard reports of Margaret's stunning beauty, and sent Suffolk to negotiate with Charles, who consented to the marriage on condition that he would not have to provide the customary dowry and instead would receive the province of Maine from the English. These conditions were agreed upon in the Treaty of Tours in 1444, but the cession of Maine was kept secret from Parliament, as it was known that this would be hugely unpopular with the English populace. The marriage took place at Titchfield Abbey on 23 April 1445, one month after Margaret's 15th birthday. She had arrived with an established household, composed primarily not of Angevins, but of members of Henry's royal servants; this increase in the size of the royal household, and a concomitant increase on the birth of their son, Edward of Westminster, in 1453, led to proportionately greater expense but also to greater patronage opportunities at Court.

Henry had wavered in yielding Maine to Charles, knowing that the move was unpopular and would be opposed by the Dukes of Gloucester and York, and also because Maine was vital to the defence of Normandy. However, Margaret was determined that he should see it through. As the treaty became public knowledge in 1446, public anger focused on the Earl of Suffolk, but Henry and Margaret were determined to protect him.

== Ascendancy of Suffolk and Somerset ==
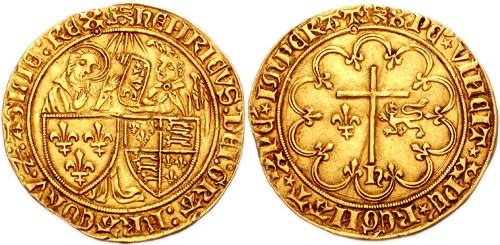
Salut d'or, depicting Henry as King of England and France, struck in Rouen

In 1447, the king and queen summoned the Duke of Gloucester to appear before parliament on the charge of treason. Queen Margaret had no tolerance for any sign of disloyalty toward her husband and kingdom, thus any suspicion of this was immediately brought to her attention. This move was instigated by Gloucester's enemies, the earl of Suffolk, whom Margaret held in great esteem, and the ageing Cardinal Beaufort and his nephew, Edmund Beaufort, Earl of Somerset. Gloucester was put in custody in Bury St Edmunds, where he died, probably of a heart attack (although contemporary rumours spoke of poisoning) before he could be tried. (Note: With the King's only remaining uncle dead, there were many, though no obvious, candidates to succeed Henry VI to the throne if he died childless. Henry VI's grandfather Henry IV had inaugurated a trend of favouring male succession by his deposition of Richard II in 1399. By this logic, the most senior candidate in the royal family, through male line descent from Edward III, was Richard of York, or his rival Edmund Beaufort (the Earl of Somerset) in case the Beaufort line was declared eligible to succeed (Henry IV had barred them from succession due to their initial illegitimacy). Through primogeniture, however, which was the traditional method of English succession, the legitimate successor would be Afonso V of Portugal through his descent from Henry IV's eldest sister, but his status as a foreign monarch made him very unlikely to become king. An alternative line of succession would be the descendants of Henry IV's second sister, whose son was John Holland, 2nd Duke of Exeter. A fifth candidate to the throne was Margaret Beaufort, who was the heir general of the House of Lancaster (through Henry IV's semi-legitimate brother, John Beaufort), if the Beaufort family was admitted into the succession line. She would later marry Henry VI's maternal half-brother Edmund Tudor, 1st Earl of Richmond, and originate the Tudor claim to the throne.)

The Duke of York, being the most powerful duke in the realm and also being both an agnate and the heir general of Edward III (thus having, according to some, a better claim to the throne than Henry VI himself), probably had the best chances to succeed to the throne after Gloucester. However, he was excluded from the court circle and sent to govern Ireland, while his opponents, the earls of Suffolk and Somerset, were promoted to dukes, a title at that time still normally reserved for immediate relatives of the monarch. The new duke of Somerset was sent to France to assume the command of the English forces; this prestigious position was previously held by the duke of York himself, who was dismayed at his term not being renewed and at seeing his enemy take control of it.

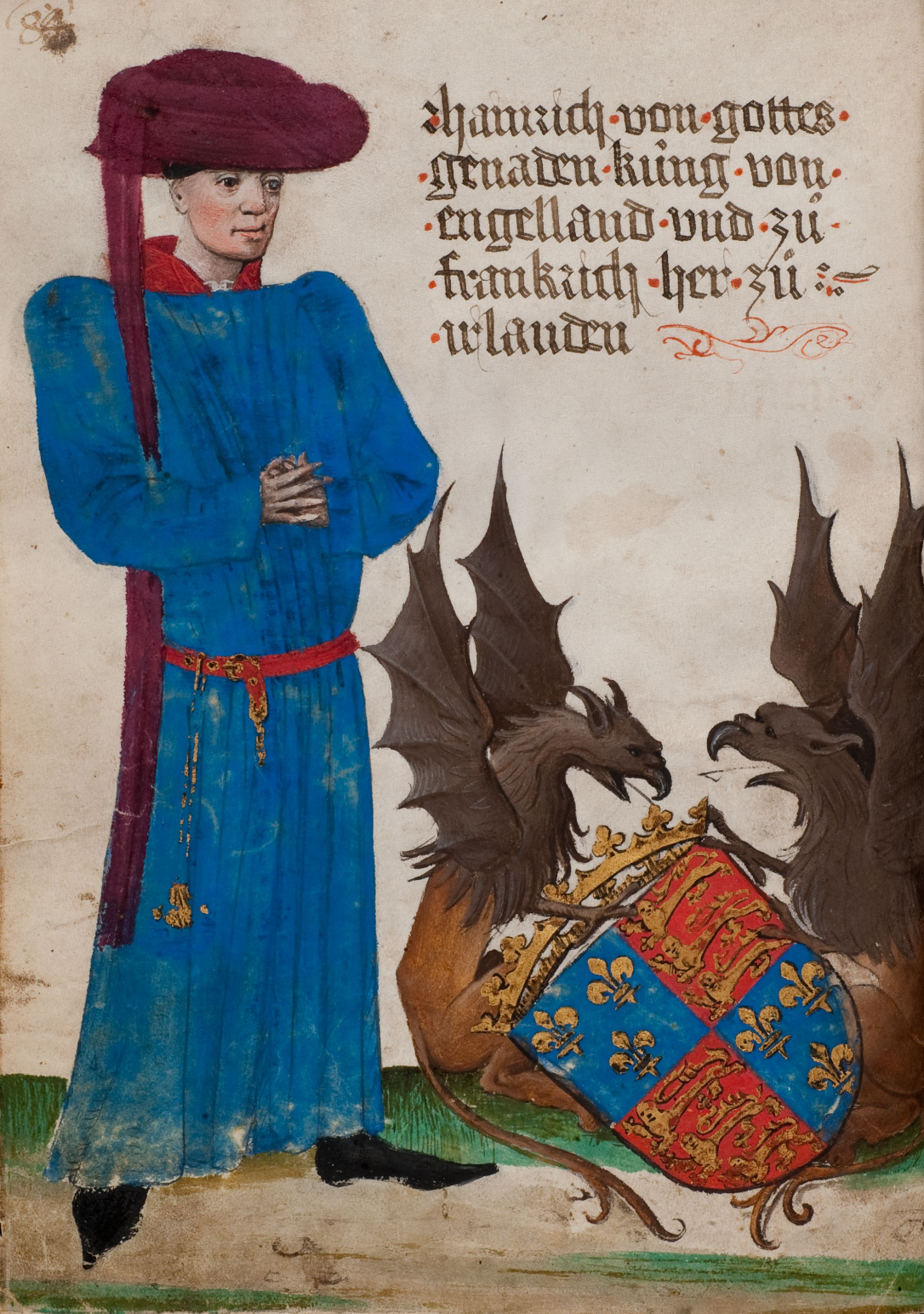
Manuscript depiction of Henry VI c. 1457

In the later years of Henry's reign, the monarchy became increasingly unpopular, due to a breakdown in law and order, corruption, the distribution of royal land to the king's court favourites, the troubled state of the crown's finances, and the steady loss of territories in France. In 1447, this unpopularity took the form of a Commons campaign against William de la Pole, 1st Duke of Suffolk, who was the most unpopular of all the king's entourage and widely seen as a traitor. He was impeached by Parliament to a background that has been called "the baying for Suffolk's blood [by] a London mob", to the extent that Suffolk admitted his alarm to Henry. Ultimately, Henry was forced to send him into exile, but Suffolk's ship was intercepted in the English Channel. His murdered body was found on the beach at Dover.

Henry's mental health began to deteriorate in the late 1440s. He exhibited possible signs of paranoia (the arrest of Duke Humphrey in 1447) and grandiosity (the scale of his plans of expansion for Eton Chapel in 1449 and King's College in 1446). By 1449, Henry had many critics questioning his ability to rule due to his mental health. The nature of his illness has been debated by historians, with one hypothesis suggesting schizophrenia, while others describe it as a severe catatonic breakdown or depressive episode.

In 1449, the Duke of Somerset, leading the campaign in France, reopened hostilities in Normandy (although he had previously been one of the main advocates for peace), but by the autumn he had been pushed back to Caen. By 1450, the French had retaken the whole province, so hard won by Henry V. Returning troops, who had often not been paid, added to the lawlessness in the southern counties of England. Jack Cade led a rebellion in Kent in 1450, calling himself "John Mortimer", apparently in sympathy with York, and setting up residence at the White Hart Inn in Southwark (the white hart had been the symbol of the deposed Richard II). Henry came to London with an army to crush the rebellion, but on finding that Cade had fled kept most of his troops behind while a small force followed the rebels and met them at Sevenoaks. The flight proved to have been tactical: Cade successfully ambushed the force in the Battle of Solefields (near Sevenoaks) and returned to occupy London. In the end, the rebellion achieved nothing, and London was retaken after a few days of disorder; but this was principally because of the efforts of its own residents rather than those of the army. At any rate, the rebellion showed that feelings of discontent were running high.

In 1451, the Duchy of Aquitaine, held by England since Henry II's time, was also lost. In October 1452, an English advance in Aquitaine retook Bordeaux and was having some success, but by 1453 Bordeaux was lost again, leaving Calais as the only part of mainland France in English hands.

== Illness and the ascendancy of York ==
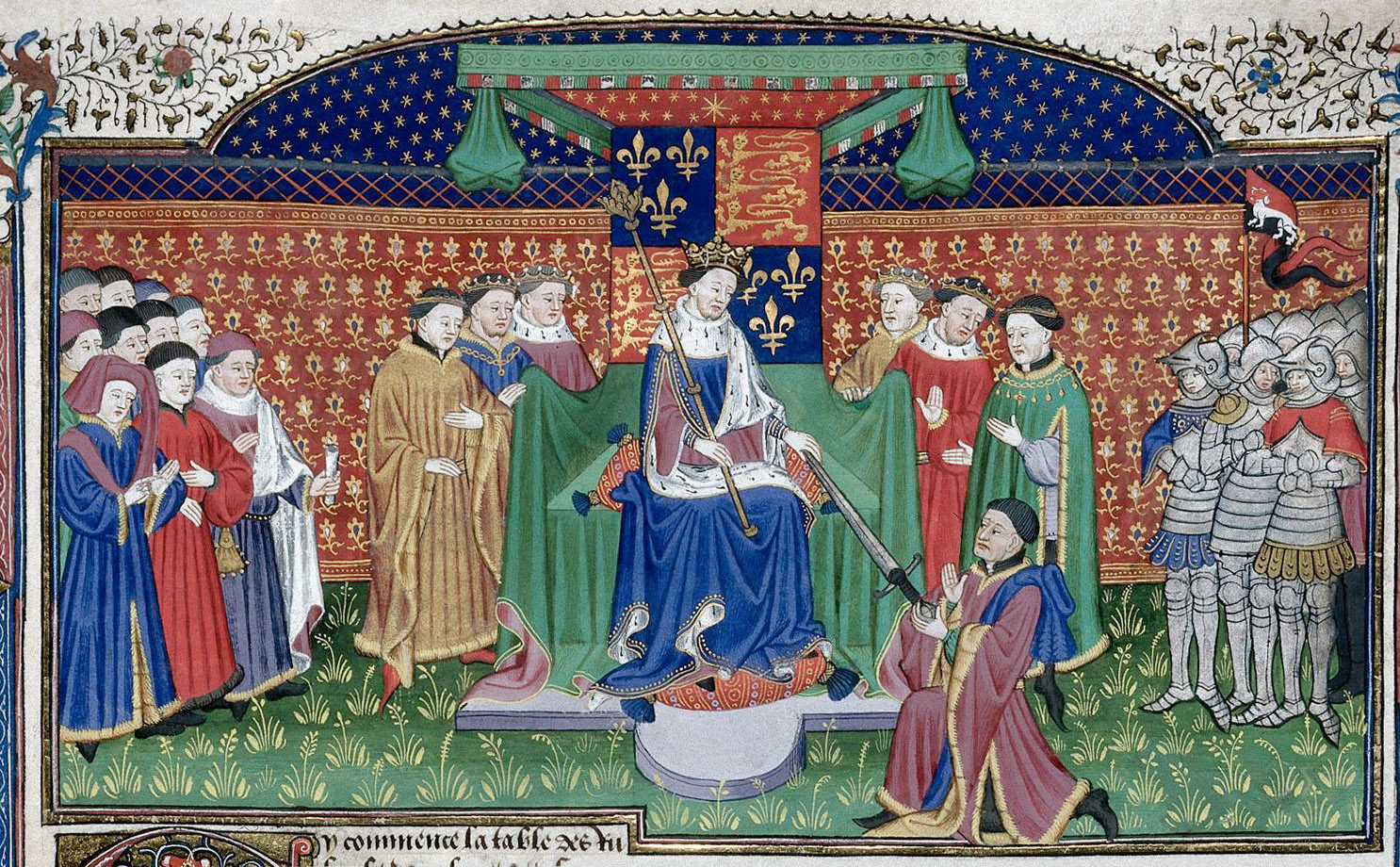
Depiction of Henry enthroned, from the Talbot Shrewsbury Book, 1444–45

In 1452, the Duke of York was persuaded to return from Ireland, claim his rightful place on the council, and put an end to bad government. His cause was a popular one and he soon raised an army at Shrewsbury. The court party, meanwhile, raised their own similar-sized force in London. A stand-off took place south of London, with the Duke of York presenting a list of grievances and demands to the court circle, including the arrest of Edmund Beaufort, Duke of Somerset. The king initially agreed, but Margaret intervened to prevent the arrest of Beaufort. By 1453, Somerset's influence had been restored, and York was again isolated. The court party was also strengthened by the announcement that the queen was pregnant.

However, in August 1453, Henry received the bad news that his army had been routed in the decisive Battle of Castillon. Shortly thereafter, Henry experienced a mental breakdown. He became completely unresponsive to everything that was going on around him for more than a year. At the age of 31, he "fell by a sudden and accidental fright into such a weak state of health that for a whole year and a half he had neither sense nor reason capable of carrying on the government and neither physician nor medicine could cure that infirmity..." and he was, "...smitten with a frenzy and his wit and reason withdrawn." Henry even failed to respond to the birth of his son Edward six months into the illness.

The Duke of York, meanwhile, had gained a very important ally, Richard Neville, 16th Earl of Warwick, one of the most influential magnates and possibly richer than York himself. York was named regent as Protector of The Realm in 1454. The queen was excluded completely, and Edmund Beaufort was detained in the Tower of London, while many of York's supporters spread rumours that Edward was not the king's son, but Beaufort's. Other than that, York's months as regent were spent tackling the problem of government overspending.

== Wars of the Roses ==
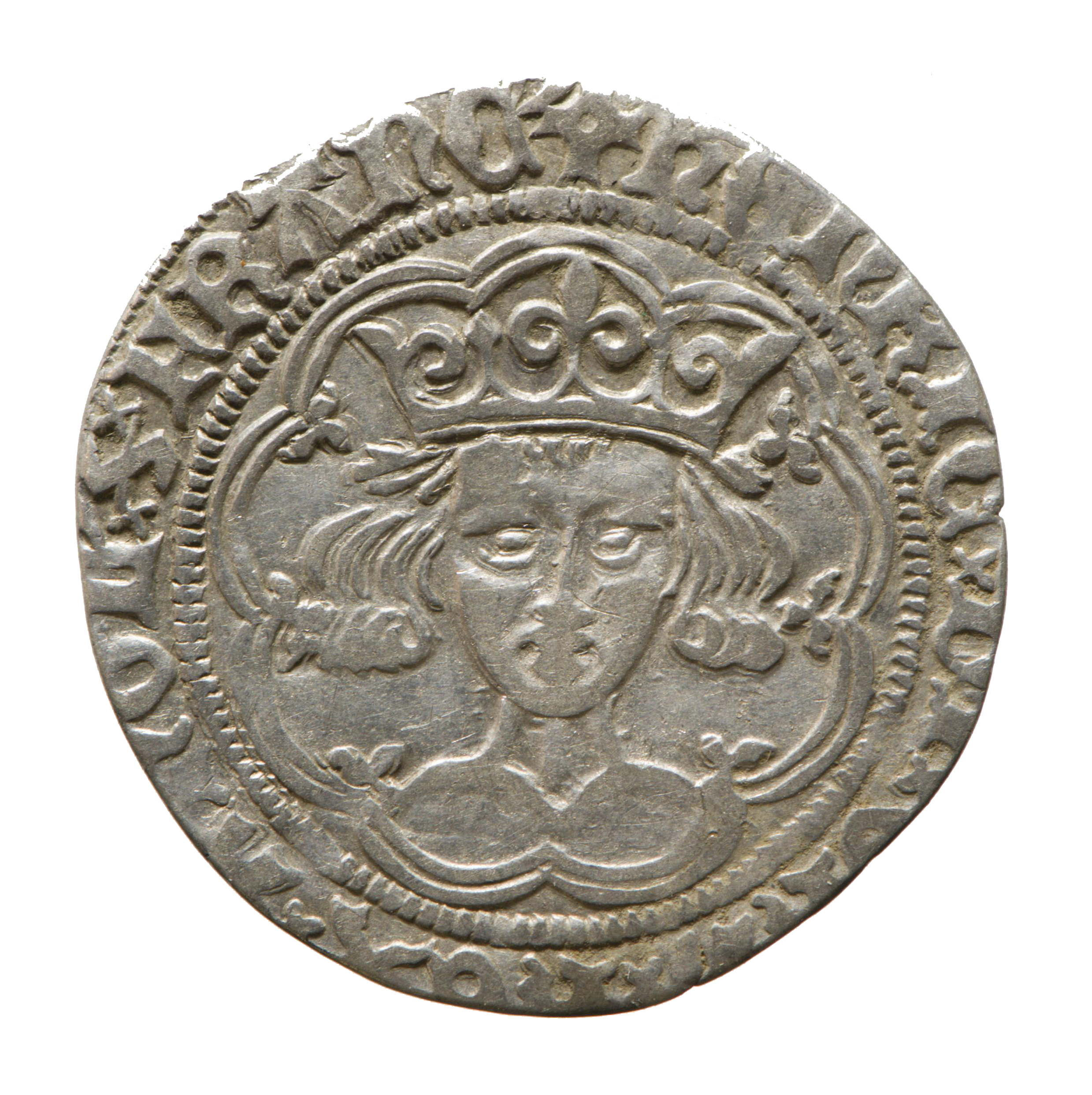
Silver groat of Henry VI, York Museums Trust

Around Christmas Day 1454, King Henry regained his senses. Disaffected nobles who had grown in power during Henry's reign, most importantly the Earls of Warwick and Salisbury, took matters into their own hands. They backed the claims of the rival House of York, first to the control of government, and then to the throne itself (from 1460), pointing to York's better descent from Edward III. It was agreed that York would become Henry's successor, despite York being older. In 1457, Henry created the Council of Wales and the Marches for his son Prince Edward, and in 1458, he attempted to unite the warring factions by staging the Loveday in London as an arbitration event.

Despite such attempts at reconciliation, tensions between the houses of Lancaster and York eventually broke out in open war. Their forces engaged at the Battle of Northampton, 10 July 1460, where the king was captured and taken into captivity under the Yorkists. Queen Margaret, who also had been on the field, managed to escape with her son, the prince, fleeing through Wales to Scotland where she found refuge in the court of the queen regent, Mary of Guelders, recent widow of James II. Here she set about eliciting support for her husband from that kingdom.

Re-entering England at the end of the year, the English queen in force engaged with the Duke of York at the Battle of Wakefield, 30 December 1460, where York fell. A few weeks later, at the Second Battle of St Albans, 17 February 1461, her forces engaged with the Earl of Warwick, under whose custody her husband was being held. She defeated Warwick and liberated the king. Henry's mental state at the time was such that he had reputedly laughed and sung as the battle raged around him.

== Exile ==
The victory however was short-lived. Within six weeks, the king and queen's forces were once more defeated at the Battle of Towton, 29 March 1461, by the Duke of York's son, Edward. Henry and Margaret together evaded capture by Edward and this time they both escaped into exile in Scotland. With Scottish aid, Margaret now travelled to the continent to elicit further support for her husband's cause.

Mainly under her leadership, Lancastrian resistance continued in the north of England during the first period of Edward IV's reign but met with little luck on the field. At the same time as Henry's cause was beginning to look increasingly desperate in military terms, an English embassy to Scotland, through the Earl of Warwick on behalf of Edward, served to further weaken his interests at the Scottish Court in political terms. After the queen mother's death on 1 December 1463, Scotland now actively sued for peace with England and the exiled king passed back across the border to try his fortune with those nobles in the north of England and Wales who were still loyal.

Following defeat in the Battle of Hexham, 15 May 1464, Henry, as a fugitive in his own land, continued to be afforded safety in various Lancastrian houses across the north of England. Sir John Pennington provided refuge to Henry VI of England in Muncaster Castle following the battle. Legend has it that Henry VI left behind a Venetian glass bowl as a token of gratitude, known as the "Luck of Muncaster", ensuring the prosperity of the Pennington family as long as it remained intact.

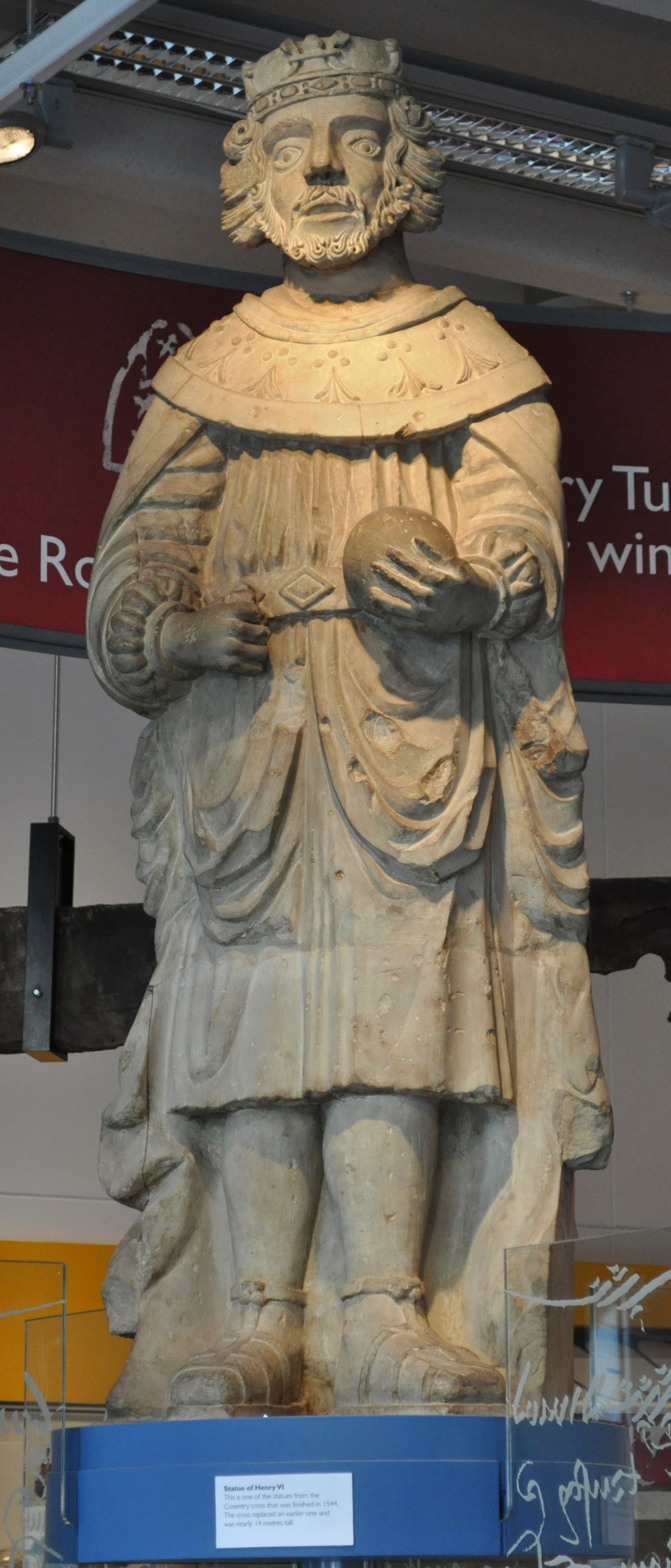
Statue of Henry VI, originally part of the Coventry Cross, constructed in 1544

Nonetheless, while he was in hiding at Waddington Hall, in Waddington, Lancashire, the home of Sir Richard Tempest, he was betrayed by "a black monk of Addington" and on 13 July 1465, a party of Yorkist men, including Sir Richard's brother John, entered the house for his arrest. Henry fled into nearby woods but was soon captured at Brungerley Hippings (stepping stones) over the River Ribble. He was subsequently held captive in the Tower of London. The following poem has long been attributed to Henry, allegedly having been written during his imprisonment. However, a largely identical verse appears in William Baldwin's 1559 work The Mirror for Magistrates, a collection of poems written from the perspective of historical figures.

Kingdoms are but cares
State is devoid of stay,
Riches are ready snares,
And hasten to decay
Pleasure is a privy prick
Which vice doth still provoke;
Pomps, imprompt; and fame, a flame;
Power, a smoldering smoke.
Who meanth to remove the rock
Owst of the slimy mud
Shall mire himself, and hardly [e]scape
The swelling of the flood.

== Return to the throne ==
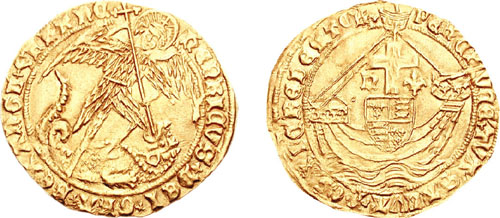
Gold "Angel" coin of Henry's later reign, struck in either London or York, showing the Archangel Michael (hence the coin's name) slaying the Dragon (left), and Henry's shield being carried aboard a ship (right)

Queen Margaret, exiled in Scotland and later in France, was determined to win back the throne on behalf of her husband and her son, Edward of Westminster. By herself, there was little she could do. However, eventually, Edward IV fell out with two of his main supporters: Richard Neville, Earl of Warwick, and his own younger brother George, Duke of Clarence. At the urging of King Louis XI of France they formed a secret alliance with Margaret. After marrying his daughter Anne Neville to Henry and Margaret's son, Warwick returned to England, forced Edward IV into exile, and restored Henry VI to the throne on 3 October 1470; the term "readeption" is still sometimes used for this event. However, by this time, years in hiding followed by years in captivity had taken their toll on Henry. Warwick and Clarence effectively ruled in his name.

Henry's return to the throne lasted less than six months. Warwick soon overreached himself by declaring war on Burgundy, whose ruler Charles the Bold responded by giving Edward IV the assistance he needed to win back his throne by force. Edward returned to England in early 1471 and was reconciled with Clarence. Warwick was killed at the Battle of Barnet on 14 April and the Yorkists won a final decisive victory at the Battle of Tewkesbury on 4 May, where Henry's son Edward of Westminster was killed. (Note: The manner of the prince's death is one of historical speculation. See: Desmond Seward. "The Wars of the Roses", and Charles Ross, "Wars of the Roses". Both retell the traditional story that the prince sought sanctuary in Tewkesbury Abbey and was dragged out and butchered in the street.)

== Imprisonment and death ==
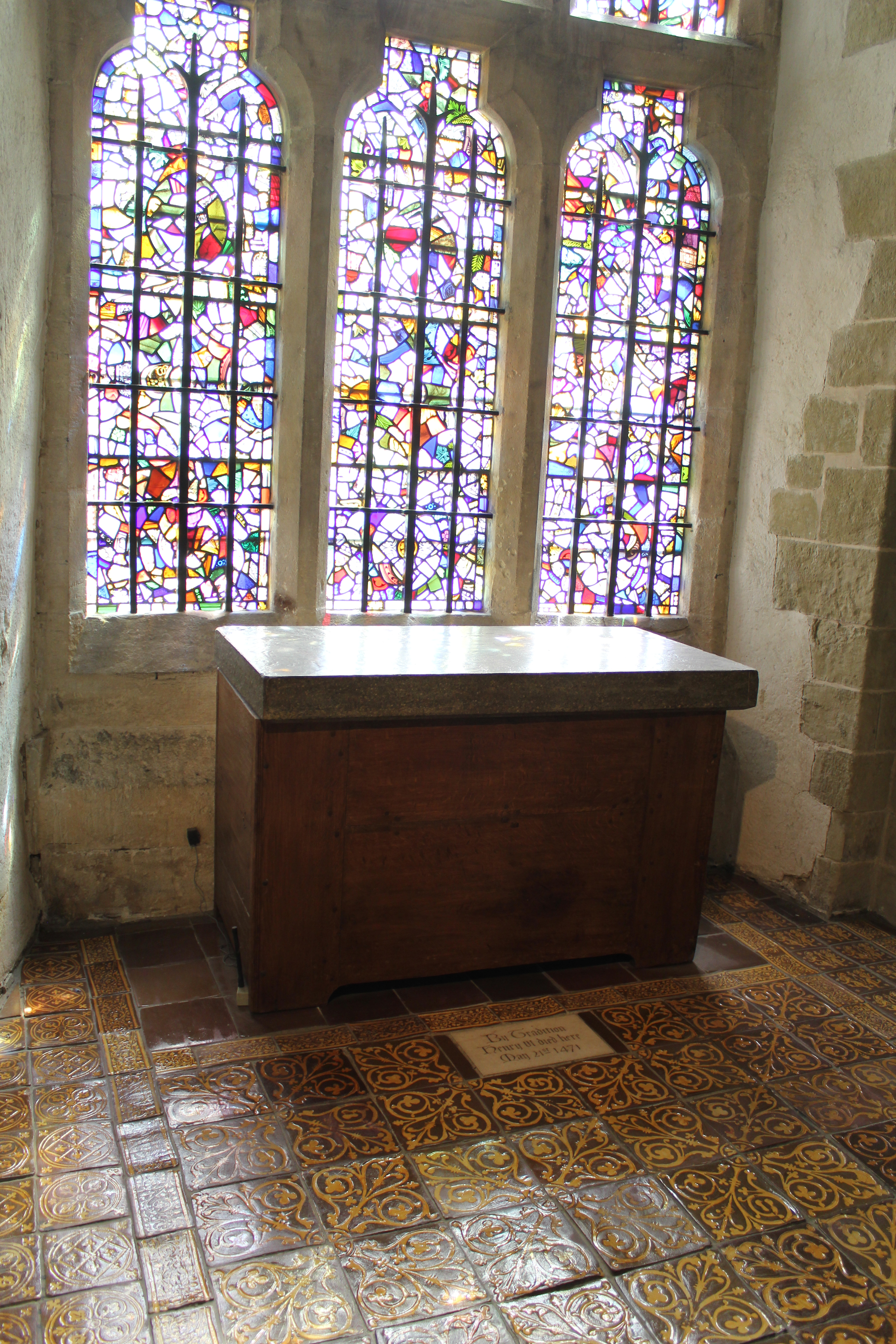
The Wakefield Tower in the Tower of London, which is treated as Henry VI's place of death for ceremonial purposes

Henry was imprisoned in the Tower of London again and when the royal party arrived in London, he was reported dead. Official chronicles and documents state that the deposed king died on the night of 21 May 1471. In all likelihood, his opponents had kept him alive up to that point, rather than leave the Lancastrians with a far more formidable leader in Henry's son, Edward. However, once the last of the most prominent Lancastrian supporters had been either killed or exiled, it became clear that Henry VI would be a burden on Edward IV's reign. The common fear was the possibility of another noble using the mentally unstable king to further their own agenda.

According to the Historie of the arrivall of Edward IV, an official chronicle favourable to Edward IV, Henry died of melancholia, but it is widely suspected, however, that Edward IV, who was re-crowned the morning following Henry's death, had ordered his murder. (Note: Either, that with Prince Edward's death, there was no longer any reason to keep Henry alive, or that, until Prince Edward died, there was little benefit to killing Henry. According to rumours at the time, which persisted for many years, Henry VI was killed by a blow to the back of the head, whilst at prayer in the late hours of 21 May 1471.)

Sir Thomas More's History of Richard III explicitly states that Richard, who was then the Duke of Gloucester, killed Henry. More might have derived his opinion from Philippe de Commines' Mémoires.

Modern tradition places his death in Wakefield Tower, part of the Tower of London, but that is not supported by evidence, and is unlikely, since the tower was used for record storage at the time. Henry's actual place of death is unknown, though he was imprisoned within the Tower of London.

King Henry VI was originally buried in Chertsey Abbey in Surrey, but in 1484 Richard III had his body moved to St George's Chapel, Windsor Castle. When the body was exhumed in 1910, it was found to be 5 feet 9 inches (175 cm) tall with a damaged, abnormally thin skull and the fore-leg bone of a pig substituting his missing right arm. It was initially thought the damage to the skull indicated a violent death, however due to the difficult nature in identifying cause of death from bones alone, as well as the previous redisposition of his body, such evidence is inconclusive.

== Legacy ==
Overall, Henry VI is largely seen as a weak, inept king, whose inability to rule effectively led to the Wars of the Roses. He favoured diplomacy, rather than all-out war in the Hundred Years' War, in stark contrast to his father, Henry V, who led the victory at Agincourt. This allowed Henry to be heavily influenced by many nobles, such as William de la Pole, who oversaw significant English losses in France, such as the Siege of Orléans. However, historians such as Bertram Wolffe have challenged the image of Henry as merely saintly and unworldly, suggesting he exercised personal rule but with poor judgment and political acumen. John Watts has emphasized the politics of kingship and how Henry's personal preferences and style of rule contributed to the instability. On the other hand, many historians see Henry as a pious, generous king, who was victim of an unstable crown, caused by the deposition of Richard II. John Blacman, personal chaplain of Henry, described the king as a man without "any crook or uncouth."

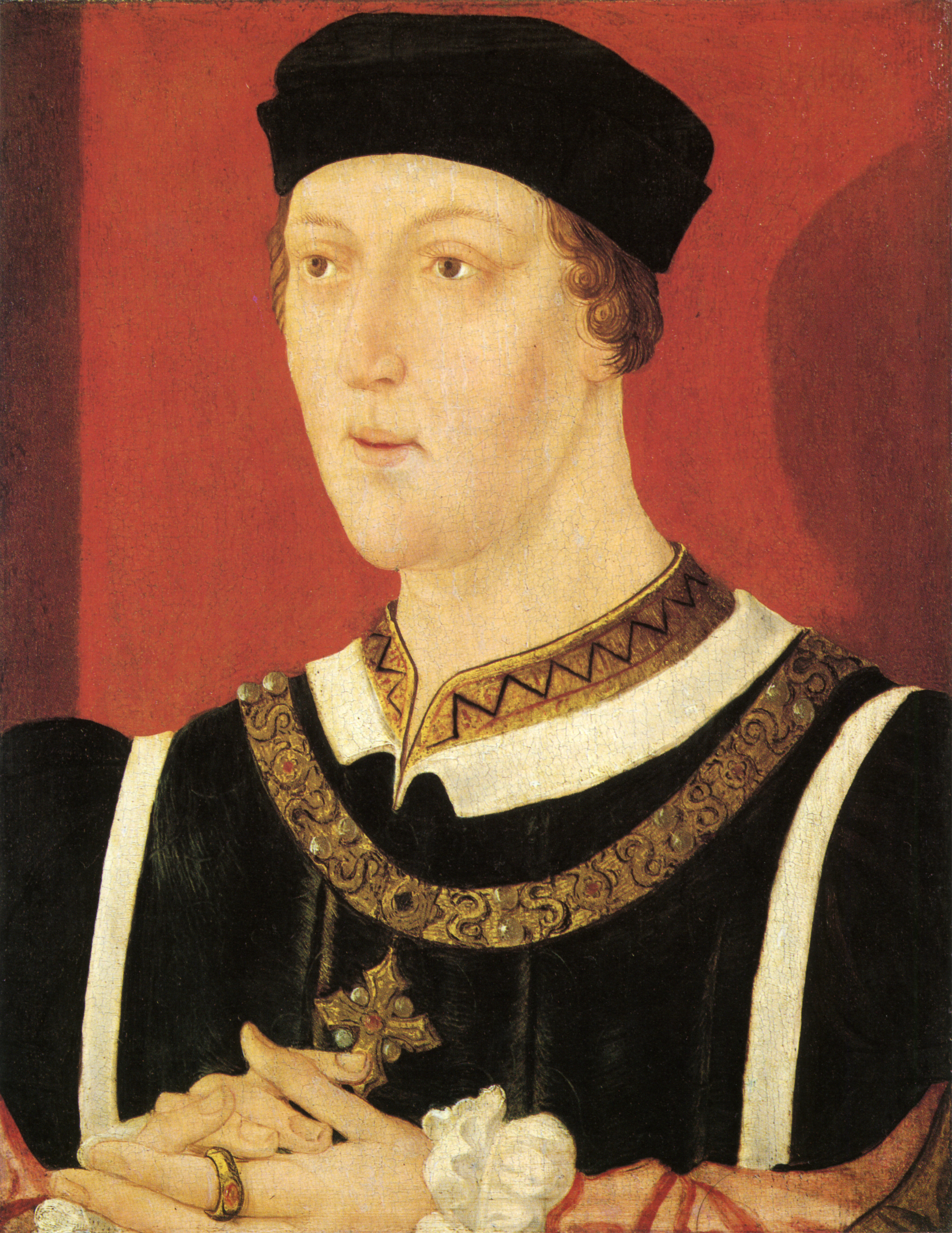
16th-century portrait of Henry (National Portrait Gallery, London)

=== Architecture and education ===
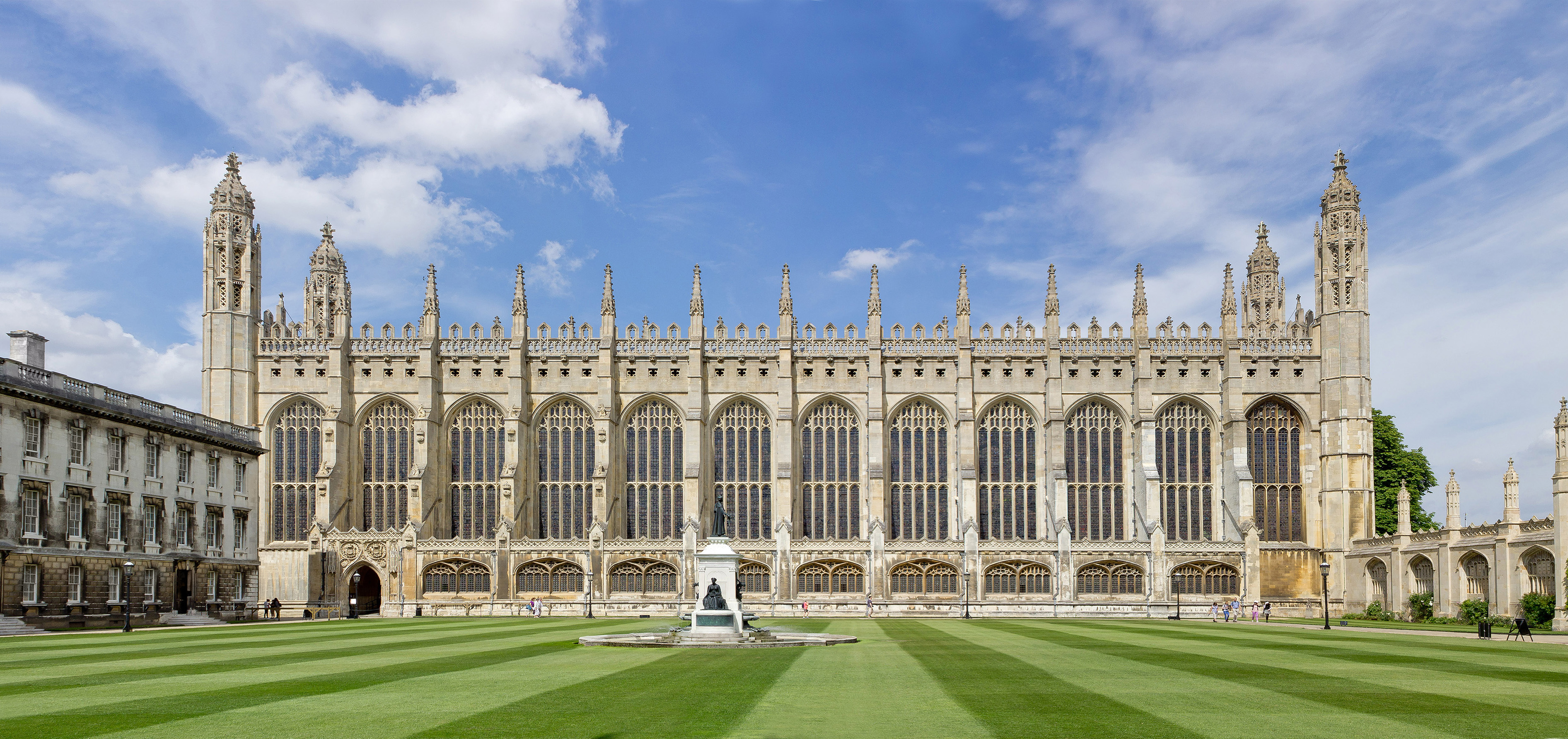
King's College Chapel, Cambridge

Henry's one lasting achievement was his fostering of education: he founded Eton College; King's College, Cambridge; and All Souls College, Oxford. He continued a career of architectural patronage started by his father: King's College Chapel and Eton College Chapel and most of his other architectural commissions (such as his completion of his father's foundation of Syon Abbey) consisted of a late Gothic or Perpendicular-style church with a monastic or educational foundation attached. Each year on the anniversary of Henry VI's death, the Provosts of Eton and King's lay white lilies and roses, the respective floral emblems of those colleges, on the spot in the Wakefield Tower at the Tower of London where the imprisoned Henry VI was, according to tradition, murdered as he knelt at prayer. There is a similar ceremony at his resting place, St George's Chapel.

=== Posthumous cult ===
Miracles were attributed to Henry, and he was informally regarded as a saint and martyr, addressed particularly in cases of adversity. The anti-Yorkist cult was encouraged by Henry VII of England as dynastic propaganda. A volume was compiled of the miracles attributed to him at St George's Chapel, Windsor, where Richard III had reinterred him, and Henry VII began building a chapel at Westminster Abbey to house Henry VI's relics. A number of Henry VI's miracles possessed a political dimension, such as his cure of a young girl afflicted with the King's evil, whose parents refused to bring her to the usurper, Richard III. By the time of Henry VIII's break with Rome, canonisation proceedings were under way. Hymns to him still exist, and until the Reformation his hat was kept by his tomb at Windsor, where pilgrims would put it on to enlist Henry's aid against migraines.

Numerous miracles were credited to the dead king, including his raising the plague victim Alice Newnett from the dead and appearing to her as she was being stitched in her shroud. He also intervened in the attempted hanging of a man who had been unjustly condemned to death, accused of stealing some sheep. Henry placed his hand between the rope and the man's windpipe, thus keeping him alive, after which he was revived in the cart as it was taking him away for burial. He was also capable of inflicting harm, such as when he struck John Robyns blind after Robyns cursed "Saint Henry". Robyns was healed only after he went on a pilgrimage to the shrine of King Henry. A particular devotional act that was closely associated with the cult of Henry VI was the bending of a silver coin as an offering to the "saint" so that he might perform a miracle. One story had a woman, Katherine Bailey, who was blind in one eye. As she was kneeling at mass, a stranger told her to bend a coin to King Henry. She promised to do so, and as the priest was raising the communion host, her partial blindness was cured. Although Henry VI's shrine was enormously popular as a pilgrimage destination during the early decades of the 16th century, over time, with the lessened need to legitimise Tudor rule, his cult faded.

=== In culture ===
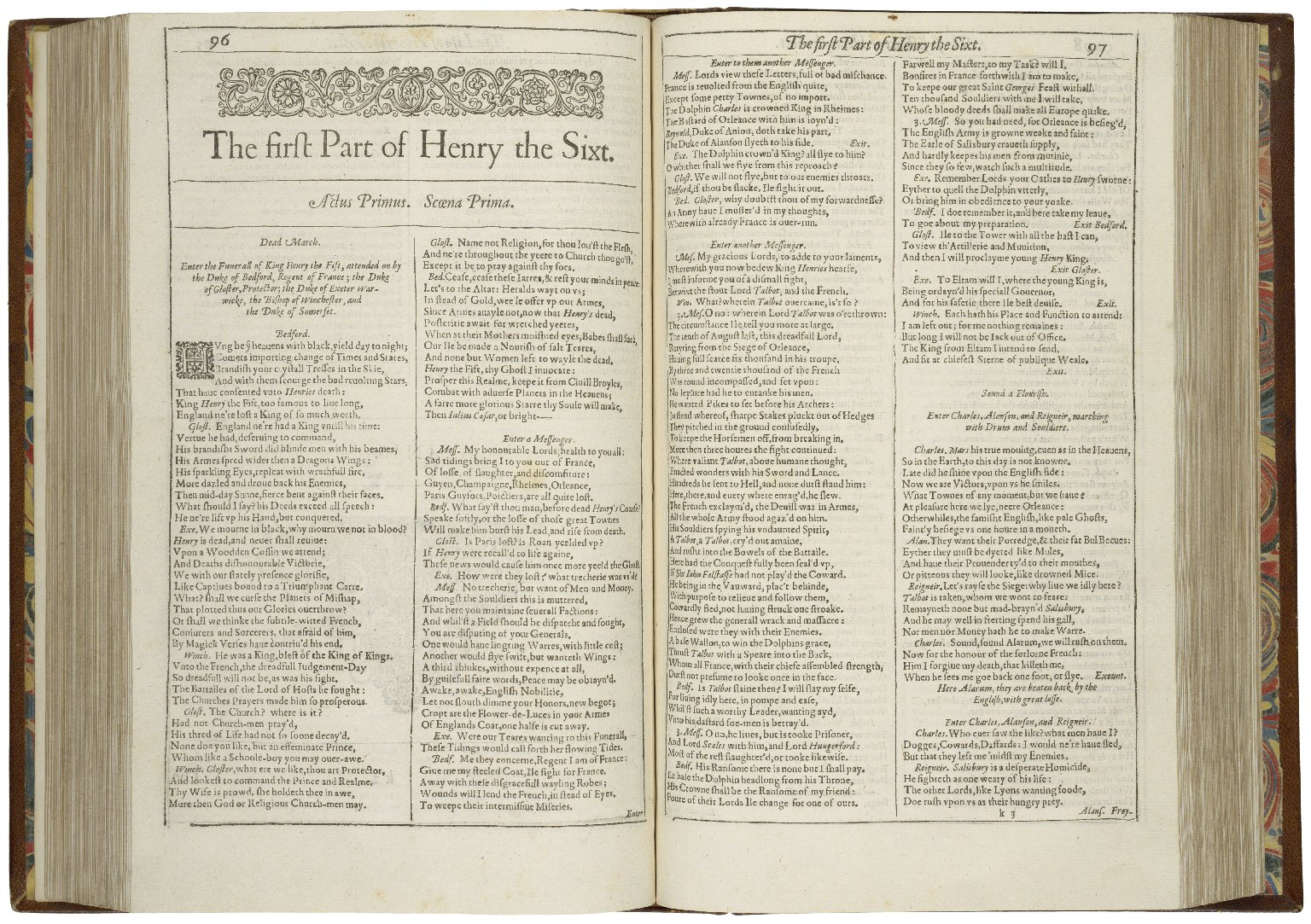
First page of The first Part of Henry the Sixth from the First Folio (1623)

William Shakespeare and possibly others completed the Henry VI trilogy around 1593, roughly 121 years after the real monarch's death. The period of history covered in the plays was between the funeral of Henry V (1422) to the Battle of Tewkesbury (1471).

Though modern scholars are more interested in the context that the Henry VI trilogy paved for the more popular play Richard III, it was very popular during Elizabethan times. Rather than being representative of the historical events or the actual life and temperament of Henry VI himself, the Shakespearean plays are more representative of the pivotal political situation in England at that time: international war in the form of the Hundred Years' War, and civil strife in the form of the War of the Roses.

Shakespeare's portrayal of Henry is notable in that it does not mention the King's madness. This is considered to have been a politically advisable move to not risk offending Elizabeth I whose family was descended from Henry's Lancastrian family. Instead, Henry is portrayed as a pious and peaceful man ill-suited to the crown. He spends most of his time in contemplation of the Bible and expressing his wish to be anyone other than a king. Shakespeare's Henry is weak-willed and easily influenced allowing his policies to be led by Margaret and her allies, and being unable to defend himself against York's claim to the throne. He takes an act of his own volition only just before his death when he curses Richard of Gloucester just before he is murdered. (Shakespeare, William: Henry VI, Part III Act 5, scene 6)

There have been many adaptations of Richard III in film, which include the bulk of Henry VI's cultural appearances in modern times. In screen adaptations of these plays Henry has been portrayed by: James Berry in the 1911 silent short Richard III; Miles Mander portrayed Henry VI in Tower of London, a 1939 historical film loosely dramatising the rise to power of Richard III; Terry Scully in the 1960 BBC series An Age of Kings which contained all the history plays from Richard II to Richard III; Carl Wery in the 1964 West German TV version König Richard III; David Warner in The Wars of the Roses, a 1965–66 filmed version of the Royal Shakespeare Company performing the three parts of Henry VI (condensed and edited into two plays, Henry VI and Edward IV) and Richard III; Peter Benson in the 1983 BBC versions of Henry VI part 1, 2, and 3 as well as Richard III; Paul Brennen in the 1989 film version of the full cycle of consecutive history plays performed, for several years, by the English Shakespeare Company; Edward Jewesbury in the 1995 film version of Richard III with Ian McKellen as Richard; James Dalesandro as Henry in the 2007 modern-day film version of Richard III; and Tom Sturridge as Henry to Benedict Cumberbatch's Richard III in the 2016 second season of the BBC series The Hollow Crown, an adaptation of Henry VI (condensed into two parts) and Richard III. Henry VI's marriage to Margaret of Anjou is the subject of the historical novel A Stormy Life (1867) by Lady Georgiana Fullerton. The novel The Triple Crown (1912) by Rose Schuster focuses on Henry's insanity. The novel London Bridge Is Falling (1934) by Philip Lindsay depicts Henry's response to Jack Cade's Rebellion. Henry VI also features in the short story "The Duchess and the Doll" (1950) by Edith Pargeter.

== See also ==
- List of earls in the reigns of Henry VI and Edward IV of England

== Sources ==
=== Works cited ===
- Allmand, Christopher (30 April 1982), "The Coronations of Henry VI", History Today, vol. 32, no. 5, archived from the original on 28 July 2017
- "Henry VI, King of England". Encyclopædia Britannica. 28 July 1999.
- Cheetham, Anthony (2000). Antonia Fraser (ed.). The Wars of the Roses. University of California Press. ISBN 978-0-5202-2802-3.
- Craig, Leigh Ann (2003). "Royalty, Virtue, and Adversity: The Cult of King Henry VI". Albion. 35 (2): 187–209. doi:10.1017/S0095139000069817. JSTOR 4054134.
- Dicks, Samuel E. (1967). "Henry VI and the Daughters of Armagnac: A Problem in Medieval Diplomacy" (PDF). Emporia State Research Studies. 15 (4: Medieval and Renaissance Studies). Graduate Division of the Kansas State Teachers College: 5–12.
- Duffy, Eamon (1992). The Stripping of the Altars: Traditional Religion in England 1400–1580. Yale University Press. ISBN 978-0-3000-6076-8.
- Griffiths, Ralph A. (1981). The Reign of King Henry VI. Berkeley: University of California Press. ISBN 978-0-5200-4372-5.
  —— (28 May 2015). "Henry VI (1421–1471)". Oxford Dictionary of National Biography (online ed.). Oxford University Press. doi:10.1093/ref:odnb/12953. (Subscription, Wikipedia Library access or UK public library membership required.)
- Tout, Thomas Frederick (1891). "Henry VI (1421–1471)" . In Stephen, Leslie; Lee, Sidney (eds.). Dictionary of National Biography. Vol. 26. London: Smith, Elder & Co.
- Wolffe, Bertram (1981). Henry VI. London: Eyre Methuen. p. 347.
- Watts, John (1996). Henry VI and the Politics of Kingship. Cambridge University Press. ISBN 0-521-42029-6.
- Johnson, Lauren (2019). Shadow King: The Life and Death of Henry VI. Head of Zeus. ISBN 978-1-7849-7964-5.

Henry VI of England House of Lancaster Cadet branch of the House of Plantagenet Born: 6 December 1421 Died: 21 May 1471
Regnal titles
Preceded by Henry V	King of England; Lord of Ireland; 1422–1461	Succeeded by Edward IV
Preceded by Edward IV	King of England; Lord of Ireland; 1470–1471	Succeeded by Edward IV
Preceded by Charles VI	— DISPUTED — King of France; 1422–1453; Disputed by Charles VII; Reason for dispute: Treaty of Troyes	Succeeded by Charles VII as undisputed king
Peerage of England
Vacant Title last held by Henry of Monmouth	Duke of Cornwall; 1421–1422	Vacant Title next held by Edward of Westminster
French nobility
Preceded by Henry of Monmouth	Duke of Aquitaine; 1422–1453	Annexed by France
