= John Blacman =

English Catholic author (c. 1408–1485)

John Blacman (also spelt Blackman or Blakman; c. 1408 – c. 1485) was a medieval author, chaplain to Henry VI of England, and a clericus redditus in the Carthusian order.

== Life and career ==
Writing in 1474, Blacman stated that he had seen sixty-six winters, indicating he was likely born around the year 1408 in the diocese of Bath and Wells. He likely began studying at the University of Oxford in 1432, and "was elected a bachelor fellow of Merton College" in 1436. Blacman remained a fellow at Merton until 1443, when he may have also served as sub-warden. During his time at Merton, he was ordained subdeacon in September 1441, and deacon in February 1442. Atypically for a theology scholar, Blacman likely trained as a notary public, as he later served in that role at Eton College. Blacman established several relationships while at Merton that would serve him later in life, including one with Henry Sever, who served as the first provost of Eton College in 1440. Sever was likely responsible for Blacman's transfer to and fellowship at Eton college in 1443.

Blacman's fellowship at Eton college put him into close contact with the founder of Eton, King Henry VI. Henry took a personal interest in the education of the pupils at Eton, and in the construction of the new buildings and chapel for Eton college. He was a semi-frequent visitor to the college to see and manage the ongoing construction, in part because of the college's location near Windsor Castle. Blacman remained a fellow at Eton from 1443 to 1454, and developed a relationship with the King during that time. A Carthusian monk, writing c. 1465–1470, described Blacman as being the king's chaplain during his time at Eton. Although Blacman is never included in one of the formal lists of the king's chaplains, he still likely served some spiritual advisory role to the king, and was known to hold mass with the King in private. In late 1452, Blacman was appointed warden of King's Hall, Cambridge. Henry VI had also taken a significant interest in King's Hall, and fostered the strong connection between scholars at Eton and the college at Cambridge. In the same year as his appointment to King's Hall, Blacman was also appointed to his first recorded clerical living as deacon in Sapperton, Gloucestershire. The following year, Bishop Carpenter, of Worcester appointed Blacman as dean of the College of the Holy Trinity in Westbury-on-Trym. Carpenter had begun a renovation project at the college in the years before his appointment of Blacman, indicating Blacman's wardenship was not a sinecure and Carpenter intended to use Blacman's experience at Eton to inform his reforms at the college.

Blacman resigned his position at King's college in 1457, and had left the College of the Holy Trinity by 1459 in order to join the Carthusian order. The exact timing on when Blacman joined the order, and where are unclear. He spent some time at the London Charterhouse, and likely transferred to the Witham Charterhouse, by 1465. Carthusians were an eremtical, exceptionally ascetic monastic order in late medieval Europe. Blacman was required to serve a probationary period for a year before he was allowed to join the order, but in the end decided not to take his final vows. He was a clericus redditus, which is a midway version of a monk within the Carthusian order. He was a member of the community, tonsured, and sat with the monks in the choir of the church. However, clericus redditus could own property and with sufficient reason, leave the order at any time.

Within his first few years at Witham, Blacman donated twenty-four books from his collection to the priory. The books reflected Blacman's academic interests to that point in his life, including manuscripts copies of a Bible, Ranulf Higden's Polychronicon, William of Ockham’s Sum of Logic, and two copies of Geoffrey of Vinsauf's Poetria nova. The collection was fairly standard for a theology scholar and notary public for the late medieval period. During his time at the Witham priory, Blacman continued to expand his personal library, but the books took on a different tone. In 1474, the librarian at Witham made a second list of books that Blacman donated to the priory, and these shared little in common with the first list. The works are nearly exclusively religion in tenor and subject, many of them taken from popular continental mystics. Works about and by mystics such as Catherine of Siena and Bridget of Sweden, and a copy of Imitatio Christi by Thomas à Kempis are included in the list of books. Also included are works regarding local saints, such as St. Edmund, a ninth-century East Anglian saint.

Little is known about Blacman's final years at Witham. Blacman's date of death or burial is unknown, but Lovatt argues his death most likely occurred before 1485. Blacman is not included in the lists of Carthusian obits, and likely died outside the order.

== Writings ==
Blacman has two written works that survive to the modern era. The first was a commonplace book that he composed sometime in the 1460s, likely before entering the London Charterhouse. The work survives as Sloane MS 2515 in the British Library. The work is an anthology ars moriendi reflecting on death. Blacman compares his transition from a worldly life to his life in the Carthusian order as a type of death, as significant as the physical death of a person. The style and content of the work is typical for fifteenth century spirituality; the exceptional element being Blacman's meditations on death as part of joining the Carthusian order.

Blacman's other work that survived to the present is his much more famous personal biography of Henry VI. The work is less of a biography, and more of a collection of anecdotes regarding the King. Blacman didn't cover the life of the king evenly, as most of the events described took place when Blacman was at Eton and had the greatest opportunities to interact with the King. Blacman did go further than recording his own recollections, potentially interviewing servants and government officials who worked in Henry's inner circle. Despite being, "the most intimate free-standing biography yet written of an English king," Blacman's work was considered near useless for most of the past 150 years.

Charles L. Kingsford gave the authoritative reading of Blacman in his classic English Historical Literature in the Fifteenth Century, calling Blacman's work as nothing more than a panegyric, and not "of great value from a purely historical point of view." K. B. McFarlane reinforced this position in 1948, writing that Blacman was an "unreliable hagiographer." The opinions of Kingsford and McFarlane were in part drawn from the mistaken argument that Henry VII encouraged Blacman to write the hagiographic work in support of Henry's attempt to have his uncle canonized as a saint. However, beginning in the 1980s with the works of R. A. Griffiths and Roger Lovatt, Blacman's works and reputation gained appreciation and relevance. Lovatt's pair of essays, "Biographer of Henry VI" and "A Collector of Apocryphal Anecdotes" made a solid case that Blacman's work was written prior to 1485, that Blacman provided accurate testimonies (when they could be independently verified), and that the work did not come from or serve the agenda of Henry VII. More recently, Thomas Freeman has argued that Blacman wrote against a more populist understanding of Henry VI developing in the late 1470s and 1480s. The cult of Henry VI celebrated Henry's miraculous healings, and Blacman does not mention any of these supposed miracles, despite many of them occurring before 1484. Instead, Blacman focuses on the type of life Henry VI lived, emphasizing the mystical spirituality Blacman had come to celebrate after entering the Carthusian order. In Freeman's argument, Blacman was not arguing that Henry VI needed canonization due to his popular post-mortem miracles, but instead served to be an example of the kind of life that elite laity should aspire to.

Unlike the copy of Blacman's commonplace book, the manuscript copy or copies his writing on Henry VI have not survived. Luckily, Robert Copland published an edition of the work in the early sixteenth century, and then Thomas Hearne republished it in 1732. M. R. James published an English translation of Hearne's edition collated with Copland's in 1919.

Blacman's portrait of Henry VI broke with many of the traditional elements of royal biographies. For most of the medieval period in England, biographies of Kings focused either on their role as King, or on the events of their reign. Blacman instead avoided discussion of Henry VI as a monarch, and dealt with Henry's piety and private life. Henry's reign had been one mired in conflict, war, and ineptitude from a governing standpoint. Henry had famously been near catatonic for months to years at a time, making a standard biographical treatment of a King nigh impossible. Blacman, in some ways, tried to portray Henry's public failures as private virtues. Blacman wrote of Henry, "how in the two lands of England and France he was crowned as the rightful heir of each realm, I have purposely said nothing...not least known because of that most unhappy fortune which befell him..." Instead, Blacman wrote that he "may set forth somewhat concerning the many virtues of that king...He was, like a second Job, a man simple and upright, altogether fearing the Lord God, and departing from evil."

Blacman provides his evidence of the King's virtues on several elements. One virtue that Blacman highlights is the King's chastity. Blacman relates a story of the King visiting the town of Bath where he saw several men washing publicly and naked, causing Henry to ride off quickly. The visit to Bath likely occurred in 1448 during the King's visit, as a year later, the then Bishop of Bath and Wells Thomas Beckington, "ordered that in future those taking the waters must be decently clothed." Henry VI was known to his council and subjects to be an extremely pious king. Blacman reinforces this, stating that when Henry was in church, "he was never pleased to...walk to and fro, as do men of the world; but always with bared head...kneeling one may say continuously before his book, with eyes and hands upturned."Henry abhorred elements of worldliness in church, refusing to "suffer hawks, swords, or daggers to brought into church, or business agreements...even his great men and nobles he enjoined to give themselves frequently to prayer." Blacman also argues for Henry's generosity, or in his terms, liberality. Blacman relates a story that after the death of his uncle, Cardinal Henry Beaufort, Henry refused a gift of £2000 from Beaufort's estate, and instead Henry and the executors decided to use the funds to help fund Eton College and King's Hall at Cambridge. McFarlane has disproven this story, but for Blacman, this was intended to be a story of the King's consideration of the education of clergy over his own personal enrichment. For Blacman, in Thomas Freeman's opinion, the important elements of Henry VI's life were to be found in these virtues: chastity, piety, and liberality. These were ascetic and often virtues associated with clergy instead of laity, at least to the extreme presented by Blacman. Blacman is using the anecdotes to demonstrate the possible and particular actions of a layperson that should be emulated. Chastity in the face of temptation, piety and godliness against worldly concerns, and generosity even at great personal expense. Blacman intended for Henry VI to serve as a great man, not as a great King.
