= List of earls in the reigns of Henry VI and Edward IV of England =

Henry VI of England and Edward IV of England reigned during the turbulent period of English history in the fifteenth century known as the Wars of the Roses. The Wars of the Roses were a series of English civil wars for control of the throne of England fought between supporters of two rival branches of the royal House of Plantagenet. The House of Lancaster, associated with a red rose was led by Henry VI, and the House of York, whose symbol was a white rose, was led by Edward IV.

Each King reigned for two periods between 1422 and 1483 as follows:

31 August 1422 – 4 March 1461 Henry VI

4 March 1461 – 3 October 1470 Edward IV

3 October 1470 – 11 April 1471 Henry VI

11 April 1471 – 9 April 1483 Edward IV

The following individuals were Earls (suo jure or jure uxoris) or Countesses (suo jure) during the reigns of Henry VI and Edward IV.

The period of tenure as Earl or Countess is given after the name and title of each individual, including any period of minority.

Earl of Arundel

John FitzAlan, 14th Earl of Arundel (1421–1435)

Humphrey FitzAlan, 15th Earl of Arundel (1435–1438)

William FitzAlan, 16th Earl of Arundel (1438–1487)

Earl of Cambridge

Richard Plantagenet, 3rd Duke of York, 2nd Earl of Cambridge (1426–1460)

Edward Plantagenet, 4th Duke of York, 3rd Earl of Cambridge (1460–1461)

Earl of Chester

Edward of Westminster, Prince of Wales, Earl of Chester (1453–1471)

Richard Plantagenet, 3rd Duke of York, Prince of Wales, Earl of Chester (1460)

Edward Plantagenet, 4th Duke of York, Prince of Wales, Earl of Chester (1471)

Earl of Devon (First Creation)

Thomas de Courtenay, 5th Earl of Devon (1422–1458)

Thomas de Courtenay, 6th Earl of Devon (1458–1461)

John Courtenay, 7th Earl of Devon (1461–1469)

Earl of Devon (Second Creation)

Humphrey Stafford, 1st Earl of Devon (1469)

Earl of Devon (First Creation Restored)

John Courtenay, 7th Earl of Devon (1469–1471)

Earl of Dorset (Second Creation)

Thomas Beaufort, Duke of Exeter, Earl of Dorset (1411–1426)

Earl of Dorset (Third Creation)

Edmund Beaufort, 2nd Duke of Somerset, 1st Earl of Dorset (1442–1455)

Earl of Essex

Henry Bourchier, 1st Earl of Essex (1461–1483)

Earl of Huntingdon (Fourth Creation)

John Holland, 2nd Duke of Exeter, Earl of Huntingdon (1416–1447)

Henry Holland, 3rd Duke of Exeter, Earl of Huntingdon (1447–1461)

Earl of Huntingdon (Fifth Creation)

Thomas Grey, 1st Marquess of Dorset, Earl of Huntingdon (1471)

Earl of Huntingdon (Sixth Creation)

William Herbert, 2nd Earl of Pembroke, Earl of Huntingdon (1479–1491)

Earl of Kendal (First Creation)

John of Lancaster, 1st Duke of Bedford, Earl of Kendal (1414–1435)

Earl of Kendal (Second Creation)

John Beaufort, 1st Duke of Somerset, Earl of Kendal (1443–1444)

Earl of Kendal (Third Creation)

John de Foix, 1st Earl of Kendal (1446–1462)

Earl of Kent (Seventh Creation)

William Neville, 1st Earl of Kent (1461–1463)

Earl of Kent (Eighth Creation)

Edmund Grey, 1st Earl of Kent (1465–1490)

Earl of Lincoln (Sixth Creation)

John de la Pole, 1st Earl of Lincoln (1467–1487)

Earl of March (First Creation)

Richard Plantagenet, 3rd Duke of York, Earl of March (1425–1460)

Edward Plantagenet, 4th Duke of York, Earl of March (1460–1461)

Earl of Northumberland

Henry Percy, 2nd Earl of Northumberland (1416–1455)

Henry Percy, 3rd Earl of Northumberland (1455–1461)

John Neville, 1st Marquess of Montagu, Earl of Northumberland (1464–1470)

Henry Percy, 4th Earl of Northumberland (1473–1489)

Earl of Oxford

John de Vere, 12th Earl of Oxford (1417–1462)

John de Vere, 13th Earl of Oxford (1462–1513)

Earl of Pembroke (Fifth Creation)

Humphrey of Lancaster, 1st Earl of Pembroke (1414-?)

Earl of Pembroke (Sixth Creation)

William de la Pole, Earl of Pembroke (1447–1450)

Earl of Pembroke (Seventh Creation)

Jasper Tudor, Earl of Pembroke (1452–1461)

Earl of Pembroke (Eighth Creation)

William Herbert, 1st Earl of Pembroke (1468–1469)

William Herbert, 2nd Earl of Pembroke (1469–1479)

Earl of Richmond (Sixth Creation)

John of Lancaster, 1st Duke of Bedford, Earl of Richmond (1414–1435)

Earl of Richmond (Seventh Creation)

Edmund Tudor, 1st Earl of Richmond (1452–1456)

Henry Tudor, 2nd Earl of Richmond (1478–1485) [from 1485 King Henry VII of England]

Earl Rivers

Richard Woodville, 1st Earl Rivers (1466–1469)

Anthony Woodville, 2nd Earl Rivers (1469–1483)

Earl of Rutland (Second Creation)

Edmund, Earl of Rutland (1446–1460)

Earl of Salisbury (Second Creation)

Thomas Montagu, 4th Earl of Salisbury (1400–1428)

Alice Montacute, 5th Countess of Salisbury (1428–1462)

Richard Neville, 5th Earl of Salisbury (jure uxoris) (1428–1460)

Richard Neville, 6th Earl of Salisbury (1460–1471)

Earl of Salisbury (Third Creation)

George Plantagenet, 1st Duke of Clarence, 1st Earl of Salisbury (1449–1478)

Earl of Shrewsbury (Second Creation)

John Talbot, 1st Earl of Shrewsbury (1442–1453)

John Talbot, 2nd Earl of Shrewsbury (1453–1460)

John Talbot, 3rd Earl of Shrewsbury (1460–1473)

George Talbot, 4th Earl of Shrewsbury (1473–1538)

Earl of Somerset (Second creation)

John Beaufort, 1st Duke of Somerset, 1st Earl of Somerset (1418–1444)

Earl of Stafford

Humphrey Stafford, 1st Duke of Buckingham, 6th Earl of Stafford (1403–1460)

Henry Stafford, 2nd Duke of Buckingham, 7th Earl of Stafford (1460–1483)

Earl of Suffolk (Third Creation)

William de la Pole, 4th Earl of Suffolk (1415–1450)

Earl of Surrey (Second Creation)

John de Mowbray, 4th Duke of Norfolk, 1st Earl of Surrey (1451–1476)

Earl of Tankerville

Henry Grey, 2nd Earl of Tankerville (1421–1450)

Richard Grey, 3rd Earl of Tankerville (1450–1460)

Earl of Warenne

Richard of Shrewsbury, Duke of York, Earl of Warenne (1477-c.1483)

Earl of Warwick

Richard de Beauchamp, 13th Earl of Warwick (1401–1439)

Henry de Beauchamp, 1st Duke of Warwick, 14th Earl of Warwick (1439–1446)

Anne de Beauchamp, 15th Countess of Warwick (suo jure) (1446–1492)

Richard Neville, 16th Earl of Warwick (jure uxoris) (1448–1471)

Edward Plantagenet, 17th Earl of Warwick (1478–1499)

Earl of Westmorland

Ralph Neville, 1st Earl of Westmorland (1397–1425)

Ralph Neville, 2nd Earl of Westmorland (1425–1484)

Earl of Wiltshire (Third Creation)

James Butler, 1st Earl of Wiltshire (1449–1461)

Earl of Wiltshire (Fourth Creation)

John Stafford, 1st Earl of Wiltshire (1470–1473)

Edward Stafford, 2nd Earl of Wiltshire (1473–1499)

Earl of Winchester (Third Creation)

Lewis de Bruges, 1st Earl of Winchester (1472–1492)

Earl of Worcester (Fourth Creation)

John Tiptoft, 1st Earl of Worcester (1449–1470)

Edward Tiptoft, 2nd Earl of Worcester (1471–1485)
