= Ottoman Empire =

Former empire (c. 1299–1922)

Sublime Ottoman State: دولت عليه عثمانیه; Devlet-i ʿAlīye-i ʿOs̱mānīye
- c. 1299–1922
- Flag (1844–1922) Coat of arms (1882–1922)
- Motto: دولت ابدمدت; Devlet-i Ebed-müddet; "The Eternal State"
- Anthem: Various: "Mahmudiye Marşı" (1829–1839, 1918–1922); "Mecidiye Marşı" (1839–1861); "Aziziye Marşı" (1861–1876); "Hamidiye Marşı" (modified) (1876–1909); "Reşadiye Marşı" (1909–1918)
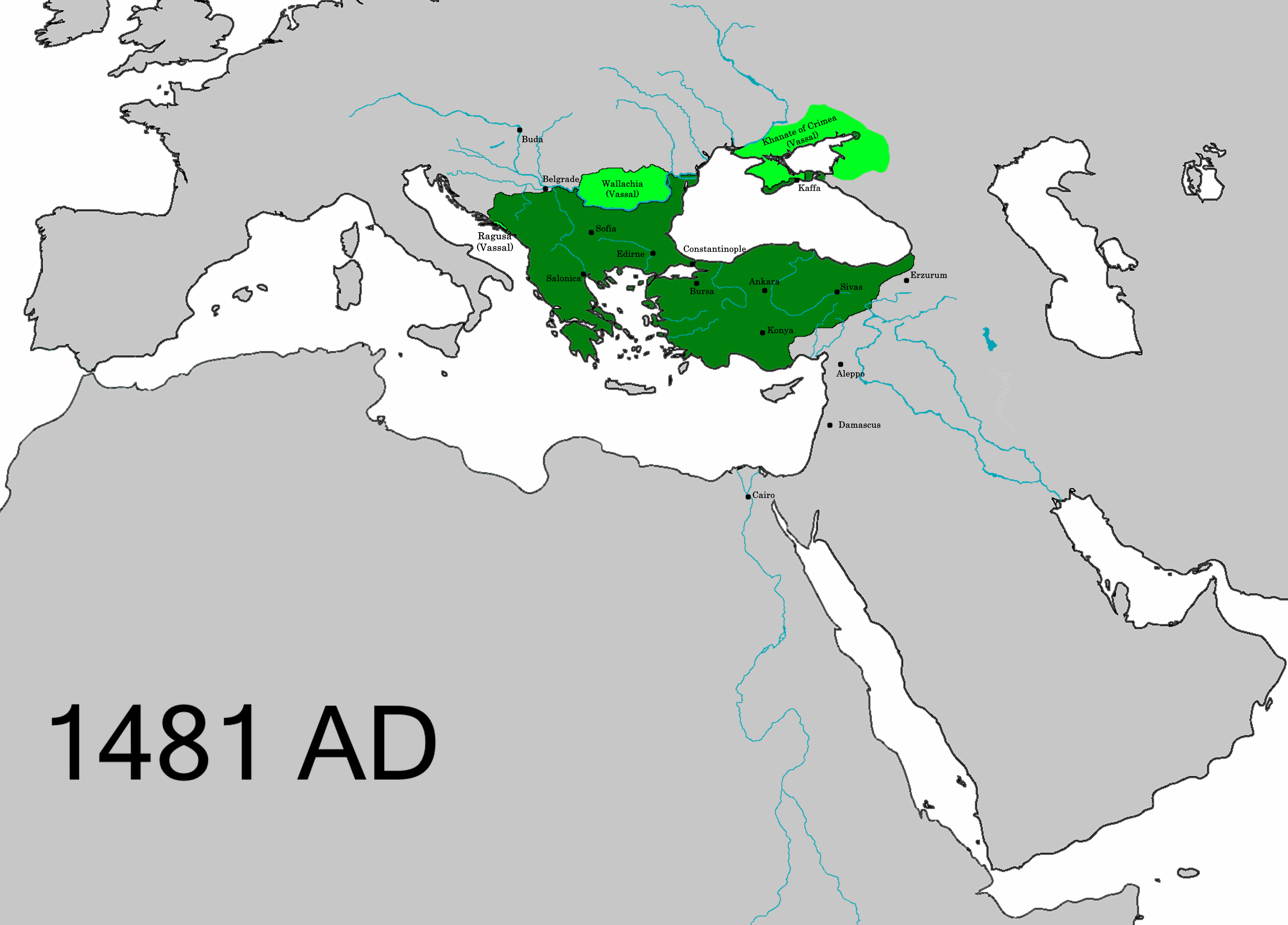
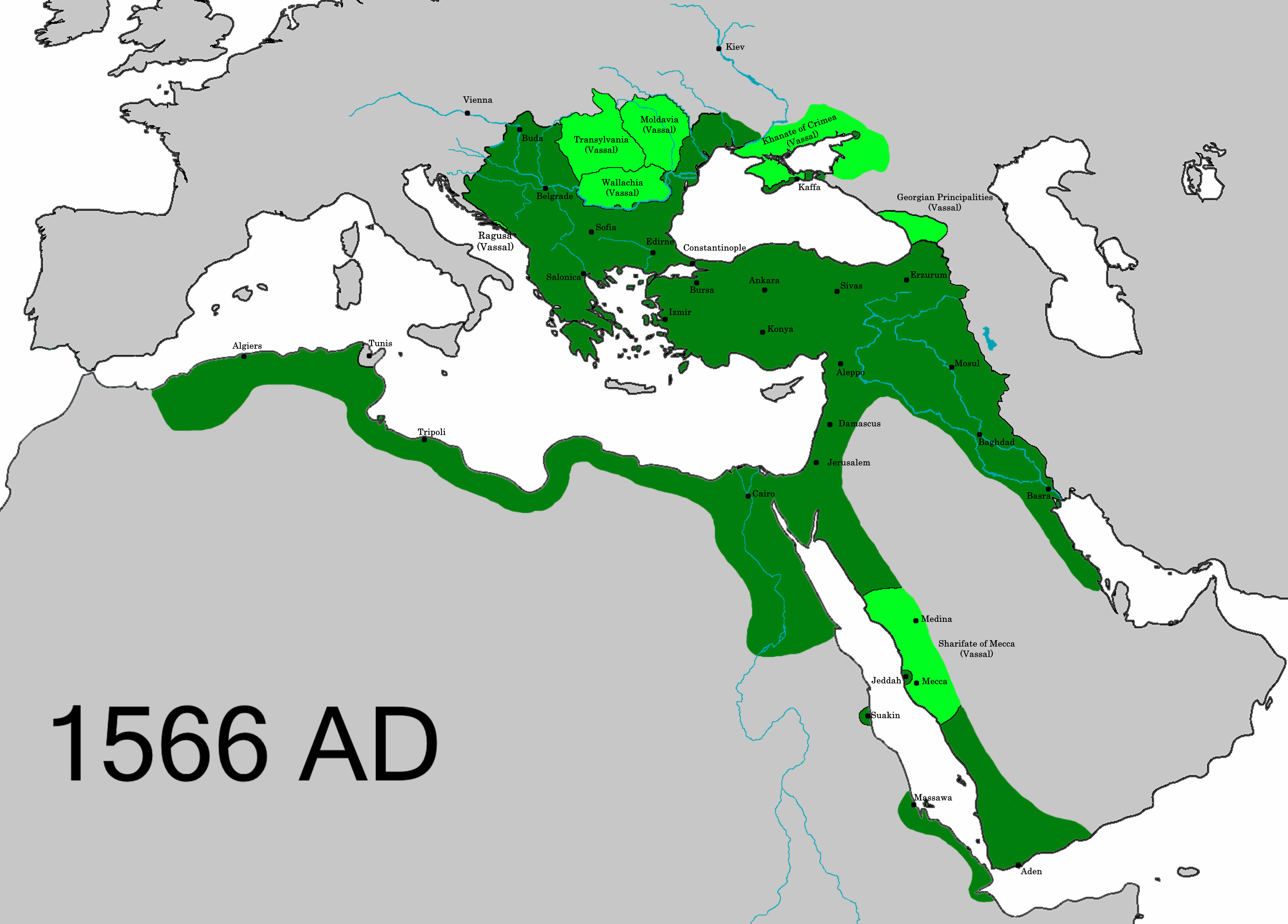
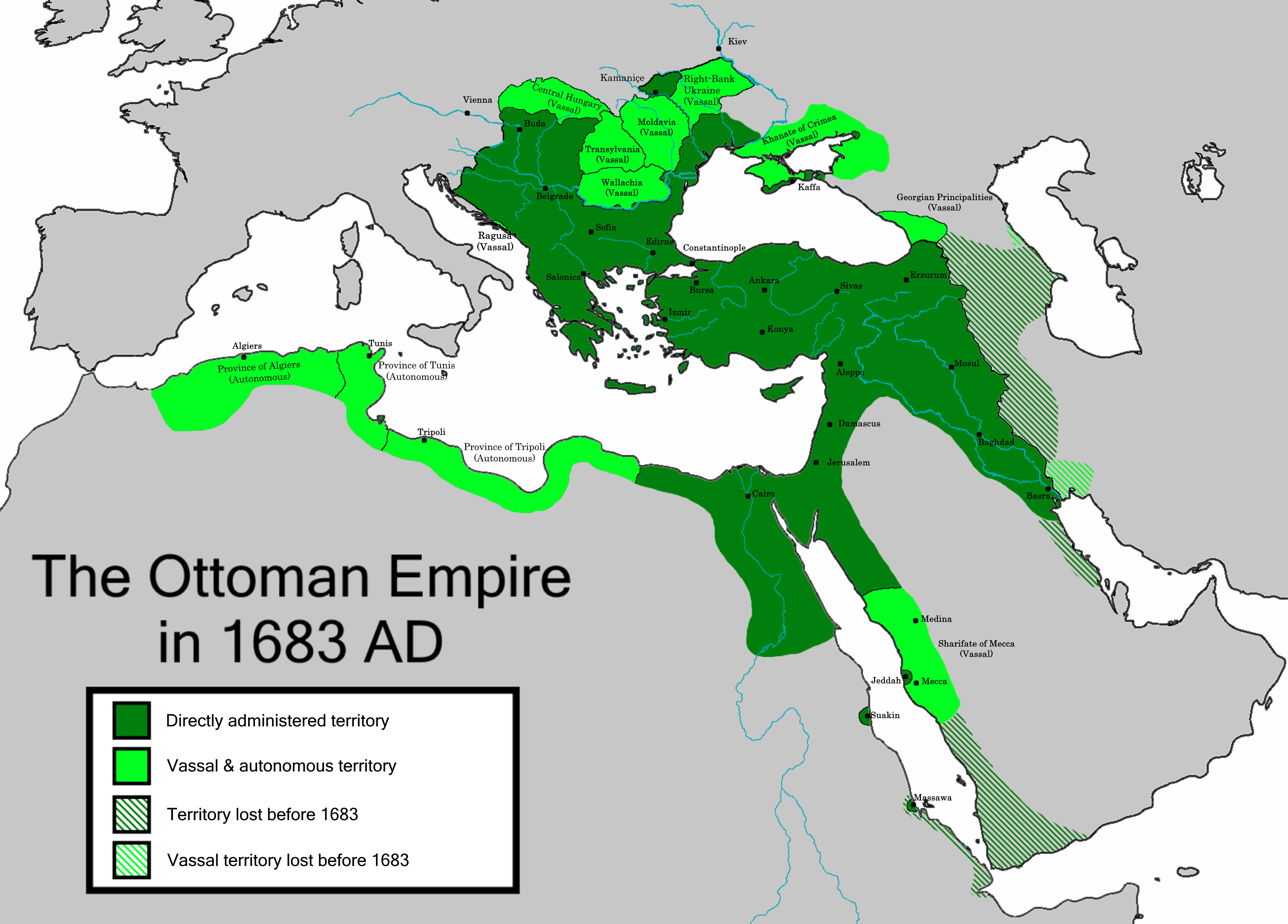
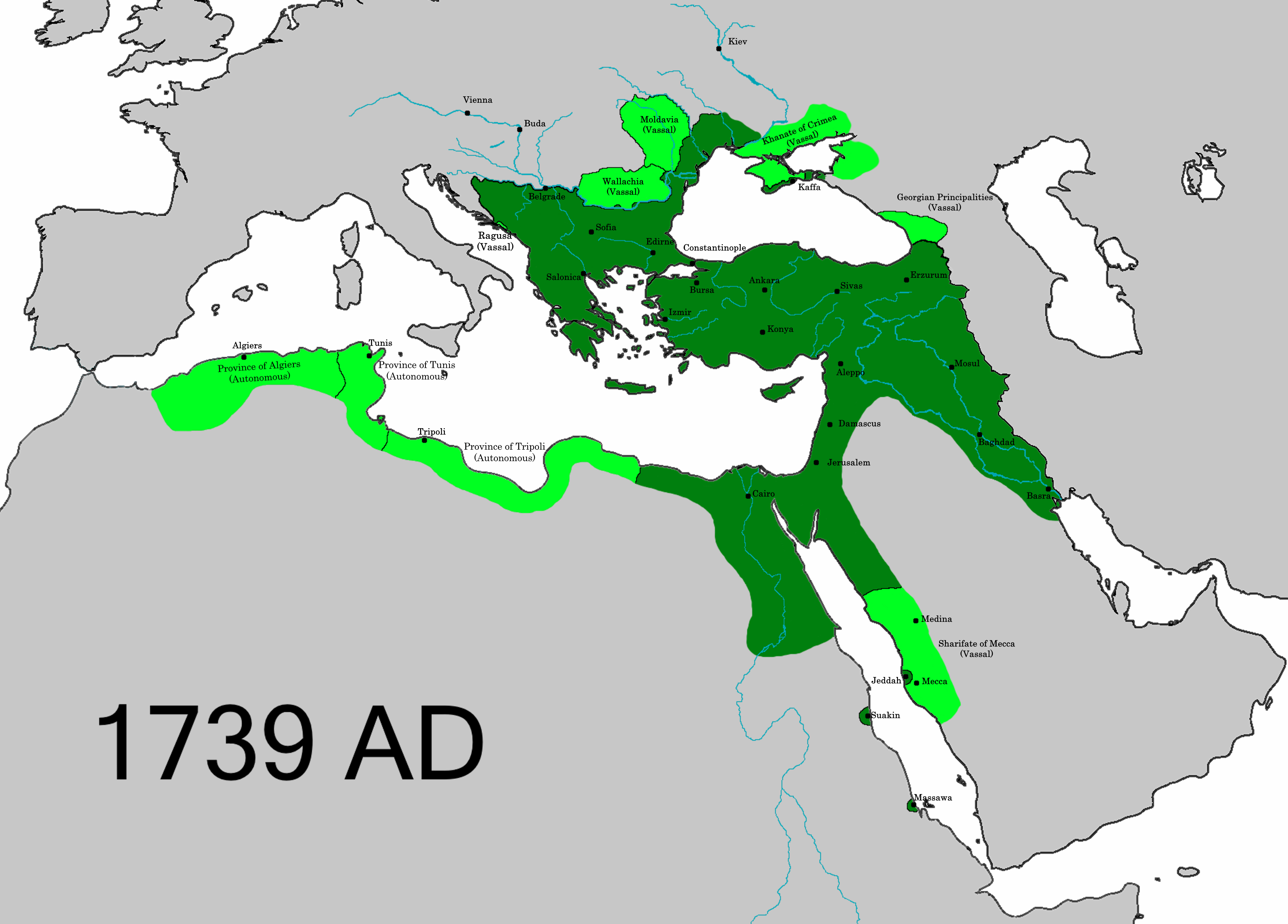
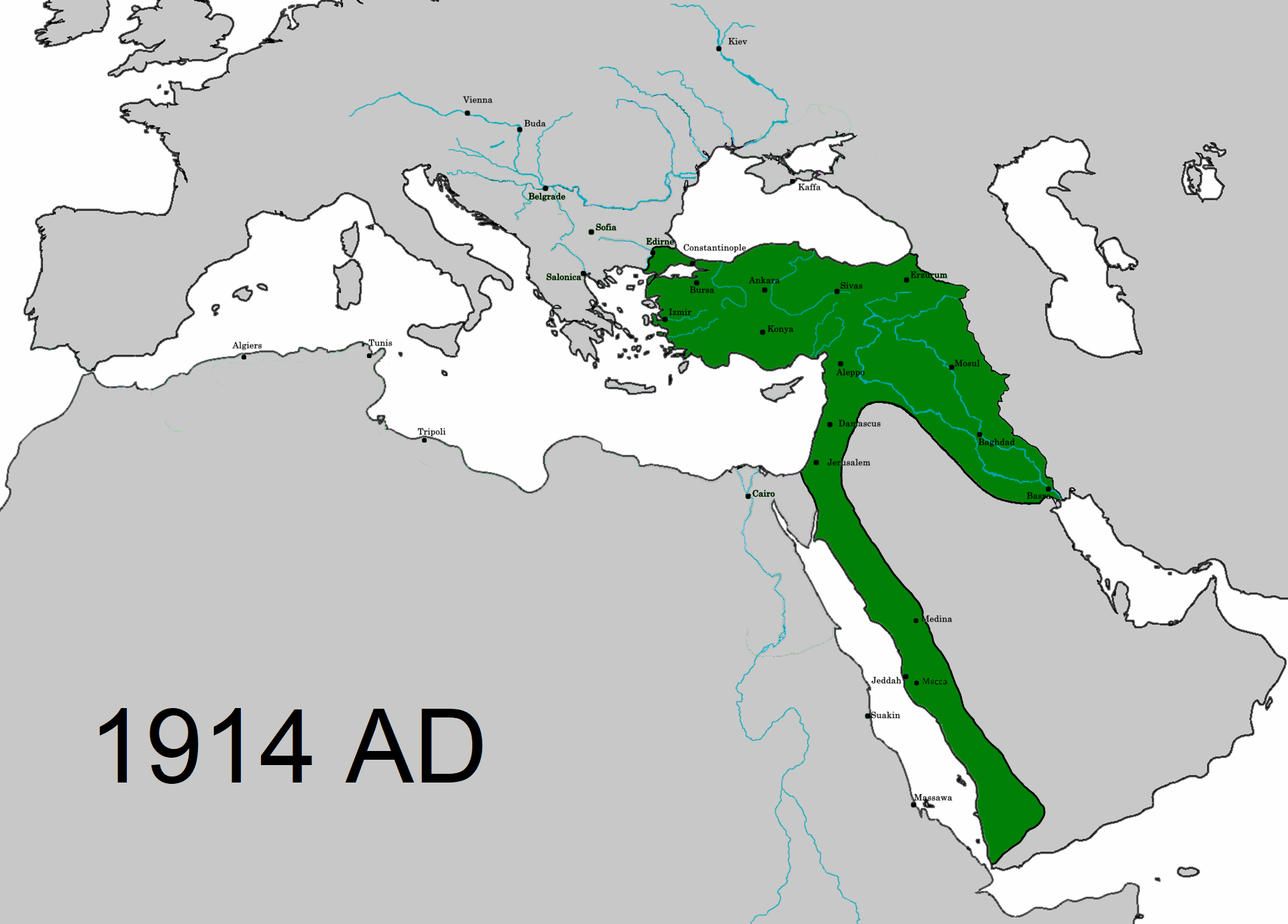
- Status: Empire
- Capital: Söğüt; (c. 1299–1331); Nicaea (İznik); (1331–1335); Prousa (Bursa); (1335–1360s); Adrianople (Edirne) (Note: İslâm Ansiklopedisi: "It is disputed when the Ottomans conquered this place; various dates have been put forward in this regard, such as 1361, 1362, 1367 and 1369. Among these, the opinion that Edirne was captured in 1361 as a result of a systematic conquest policy by Murad and Lala Şahin, while Orhan Gazi was still alive, gains prominence. However, it has also been stated that the date of conquest may have occurred after 1366 (1369), based on an elegy showing that the city metropolitan Polykarpos was in Edirne in this capacity until 1366."); (1360s–1453); Constantinople (Istanbul) (Note: In Ottoman Turkish, the city was known by various names, among which were Ḳosṭanṭīnīye (قسطنطینیه) (replacing the suffix -polis with the Arabic suffix), Istanbul (استنبول) and Islambol (اسلامبول, lit. 'full of Islam'); see Names of Istanbul). Ḳosṭanṭīnīye became obsolete in Turkish after the proclamation of the Republic of Turkey in 1923, and after Turkey's transition to Latin script in 1928, the Turkish government in 1930 requested that foreign embassies and companies use Istanbul, and that name became widely accepted internationally.); (1453–1922)
- Official languages: Ottoman Turkish
- Other languages: Arabic (Note: Liturgical language, coinage, and scientific literature); Persian (Note: Court, diplomacy, poetry, historiographical works, literary works, taught in state schools, and offered as an elective course or recommended for study in some madrasas.); Greek (Note: Among Greek-speaking community; spoken by some sultans.); Chagatai (Note: Decrees in the 15th century.); French (Note: Foreign language among educated people in the post-Tanzimat/late imperial period.); many others
- Religion: Sunni Islam (state); School: Hanafi
- Demonym: Ottoman
- Government: Absolute monarchy (c. 1299–1876; 1878–1908; 1920–1922) Parliamentary constitutional monarchy (1876–1878; 1908–1920): Under a triumvirate dictatorship (1913–1918)
- Sultan
  - c. 1299–1323/4 (first): Osman I
  - 1918–1922 (last): Mehmed VI
- Caliph
  - 1517–1520 (first): Selim I (Note: The sultan from 1512 to 1520.)
  - 1922–1924 (last): Abdülmecid II (Note: In 1922, the Ottoman Empire came to an end with the abolition of the sultanate, and Abdülmecid, a member of the Ottoman dynasty, was elected caliph by the Grand National Assembly of Turkey to replace the last sultan Mehmed VI and held the title under the Ankara Government (1922–1923) and the Republic (1923–1924).)
- Grand Vizier
  - 1320–1331 (first): Alaeddin Pasha
  - 1920–1922 (last): Ahmet Tevfik Pasha
- Legislature: General Assembly (1876–1878; 1908–1920)
  - Upper house (unelected): Chamber of Notables (1876–1878; 1908–1920)
  - Lower house (elected): Chamber of Deputies (1876–1878; 1908–1920)
- History
  - Founded: c. 1299
  - Interregnum: 1402–1413
  - Conquest of Constantinople: 29 May 1453
  - Caliphate proclaimed: 1517
  - Constitutional Era I: 1876–1878
  - Constitutional Era II: 1908–1920
  - Ottoman coup d'état: 23 January 1913
  - Sultanate abolished: 1 November 1922 (Note: 1 November 1922 marks the formal ending of the Ottoman Empire. Mehmed VI departed Constantinople on 17 November 1922.)
  - Republic of Turkey established: 29 October 1923 (Note: The Treaty of Sèvres (10 August 1920) afforded a small existence to the Ottoman Empire. On 1 November 1922, the Grand National Assembly (GNAT) abolished the sultanate and declared that all the deeds of the Ottoman regime in Constantinople were null and void as of 16 March 1920, the date of the occupation of Constantinople under the terms of the Treaty of Sèvres. The international recognition of the GNAT and the Government of Ankara was achieved through the signing of the Treaty of Lausanne on 24 July 1923. The Grand National Assembly of Turkey promulgated the Republic on 29 October 1923.)
  - Caliphate abolished: 3 March 1924

Area
- 1481: 1,220,000 km^{2} (470,000 sq mi)
- 1521: 3,400,000 km^{2} (1,300,000 sq mi)
- 1683: 5,200,000 km^{2} (2,000,000 sq mi)
- 1913: 2,550,000 km^{2} (980,000 sq mi)

Population
  - 1600: 22,000,000
  - 1912: 24,000,000
Currency	Akçe, manghir, sultani, para, kuruş, lira Dependencies: Algerian budju; Egyptian qirsh; Tunisian rial	
Predecessor states and successor states
Preceded by
Sultanate of Rum
Anatolian beyliks
Byzantine Empire
Despotate of the Morea
Empire of Trebizond
Principality of Theodoro
Second Bulgarian Empire
Tsardom of Vidin
Despotate of Dobruja
Despotate of Lovech
Serbian Despotate
Kingdom of Bosnia
Zeta
Kingdom of Hungary
Kingdom of Croatia
League of Lezhë
Mamluk Sultanate
Hafsid Kingdom
Aq Qoyunlu
Hospitaller Tripoli
Kingdom of Tlemcen
Duchy of Athens
Succeeded by
State of Turkey
Hellenic Republic
Caucasus Viceroyalty
Principality of Bulgaria
Eastern Rumelia
Albania
Kingdom of Romania
Revolutionary Serbia
Bosnia and Herzegovina
Principality of Montenegro
Emirate of Asir
Kingdom of Hejaz
OETA
Mandatory Iraq
French Algeria
British Cyprus
French Tunisia
Italian Tripolitania
Italian Cyrenaica
Sheikhdom of Kuwait
Kingdom of Yemen
Sultanate of Egypt

The Ottoman Empire, (Note: /ˈɒtəmən/; Ottoman Turkish: دولت عليه عثمانیه, romanised: Devlet-i ʿAlīye-i ʿOs̱mānīye, lit. 'Sublime Ottoman State'; Turkish: Osmanlı İmparatorluğu or Osmanlı Devleti; Arabic: الدولة العلية العثمانية, romanized: al-Dawla al-ʕaliyya al-ʕuṯmāniyya; French: Empire ottoman) also known historically as Turkey or the Turkish Empire, was a state that spanned much of Southeastern Europe, West Asia, and North Africa from the 14th century to the early 20th century, centred in modern-day Turkey. It also controlled parts of southeastern Central Europe between the early 16th and early 18th centuries.

The empire emerged from a beylik, or principality, founded in northwestern Anatolia in c. 1299 by the Turkoman tribal leader Osman I. His successors conquered much of Anatolia and expanded into the Balkans by the mid-14th century, transforming their petty kingdom into a transcontinental empire. The Ottomans ended the Byzantine Empire with the conquest of Constantinople in 1453 by Mehmed II and claimed themselves as successors to the Roman Empire. Further conquests by Selim I led the Sultans to adopt the title of caliph. With its capital at Constantinople and control over a significant portion of the Mediterranean Basin, the Ottoman Empire was at the centre of interactions between the Middle East and Europe for six centuries. Ruling over diverse peoples, the empire granted varying levels of autonomy to its many confessional communities, or millets, to manage their own affairs per Islamic law. During the reign of Suleiman the Magnificent in the 16th century, the Ottoman Empire became a global power.

Modern academic consensus posits that the empire began to decline after defeat in the Second Siege of Vienna in 1683, but continued to maintain a flexible and strong economy, society and military into much of the 18th century. The Ottoman Empire fell behind technologically from the rest of Europe by the late 18th century as imperial authority fragmented. Further defeats from Austria and Russia culminated in the loss of territory, and with rising nationalism after the French Revolution, a number of new states emerged in the Balkans. Following Mahmud II's reign and the Tanzimat reforms over the course of the 19th century, the Ottoman state became more powerful and organised internally as a new Ottoman identity took hold. In the 1876 revolution, the Ottoman Empire attempted constitutional monarchy, before reverting to an absolute monarchy under Abdul Hamid II, following the Great Eastern Crisis.

Over the course of the late 19th century, Ottoman intellectuals known as Young Turks sought to liberalise and rationalise society and politics along Western lines, culminating in the Young Turk Revolution of 1908 led by the Committee of Union and Progress (CUP), which reestablished a constitutional monarchy. However, following the disastrous Balkan Wars, the CUP became increasingly radicalised and embraced Turkish nationalism, leading to a coup d'état in 1913 that established a dictatorship.

In the 19th and in the start of 20th centuries, persecution of Muslims during the Ottoman contraction and in the Russian Empire resulted in large-scale loss of life and mass migration into modern-day Turkey from the Balkans, Caucasus, and Crimea. The CUP joined World War I on the side of the Central Powers. It struggled with internal dissent, especially the Arab Revolt, and engaged in genocide against Armenians, Assyrians, and Greeks. In the aftermath of World War I, the victorious Allied Powers occupied and partitioned the Ottoman Empire, which lost its southern territories to the United Kingdom and France. The successful Turkish War of Independence, led by Mustafa Kemal Atatürk against the occupying Allies, led to the end of the Ottoman sultanate in 1922.

== Etymology ==
The word Ottoman is an historical anglicisation of the name of Osman I, the founder of the Empire and of the ruling House of Osman (also known as the Ottoman dynasty). Osman's name in turn was the Turkish form of the Arabic name ʿUthmān (عثمان). In Ottoman Turkish, the empire was referred to as Devlet-i ʿAlīye-yi ʿOsmānīye (دولت عليه عثمانیه), lit. 'Sublime Ottoman State', or simply Devlet-i ʿOsmānīye (دولت عثمانيه), lit. 'Ottoman State', and in Arabic, it was referred to as al-Dawla al-ʕaliyya al-ʕuṯmāniyya (الدولة العليَّة العثمانيَّة).

The Turkish word for Ottoman (Osmanlı) originally referred to the tribal followers of Osman in the 14th century. The word subsequently came to be used to refer to the empire's military-administrative elite. In contrast, the term Turk (Türk) was used to refer to the Anatolian peasant and tribal population and was seen as a disparaging term when applied to urban, educated individuals. In the early modern period, an educated, urban-dwelling Turkish speaker who was not a member of the military-administrative class typically referred to himself neither as an Osmanlı nor as a Türk, but rather as a Rūmī (رومى), or "Roman", meaning an inhabitant of the territory of the former Byzantine Empire in the Balkans and Anatolia. The term Rūmī was also used to refer to Turkish speakers by the other Muslim peoples of the empire and beyond.

In Western Europe, the names Ottoman Empire, Turkish Empire and Turkey were often used interchangeably, with Turkey being increasingly favoured both in formal and informal situations. This dichotomy was officially ended in 1920–1923, when the newly established Ankara-based Turkish government chose Turkey as the sole official name.

== History ==
=== Rise (c. 1299–1453) ===
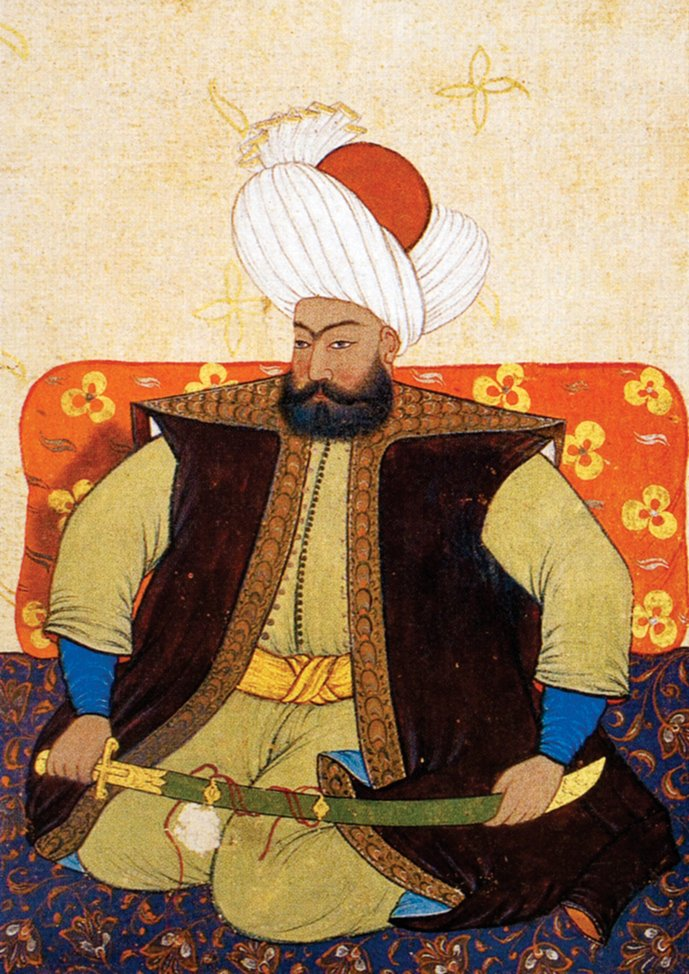
Ottoman miniature of Osman I by Yahya Bustanzâde (18th century)

As the Rum Sultanate declined in the 13th century, Anatolia was a patchwork of independent Turkish principalities known as the Anatolian Beyliks. One of these, in the Bithynia region on the Byzantine frontier, was led by Osman I (d. 1323/4), a figure of obscure origin from whom the name Ottoman is derived. Osman's early followers were Turkish tribal groups and Byzantine renegades, not all of them Muslim. Osman extended his principality by conquering Byzantine towns along the Sakarya River, and a Byzantine defeat at the Battle of Bapheus in 1302 contributed to his rise. It is not well understood how the early Ottomans came to dominate their neighbours, due to a lack of sources. The Ghaza thesis popular during the 20th century credited their success to rallying religious warriors, but the idea is no longer generally accepted, and no other hypothesis has attracted broad support.

In the century after Osman I, Ottoman rule began to extend over Anatolia and the Balkans. The Byzantine–Ottoman wars, waged in Anatolia in the late 13th century before entering Europe in the mid-14th century, were followed by the Bulgarian–Ottoman wars and the Serbian–Ottoman wars in the mid-14th century. Osman's son, Orhan, captured the northwestern Anatolian city of Bursa in 1326 and made it the new capital, supplanting Byzantine control in the region. The important port of Thessaloniki was captured from the Venetians in 1387 and sacked. The Ottoman victory in Kosovo in 1389 effectively marked the end of Serbian power in the region, paving the way for Ottoman expansion into Europe. The Battle of Nicopolis for the Bulgarian Tsardom of Vidin in 1396, regarded as the last large-scale crusade of the Middle Ages, also failed to stop the Ottomans.

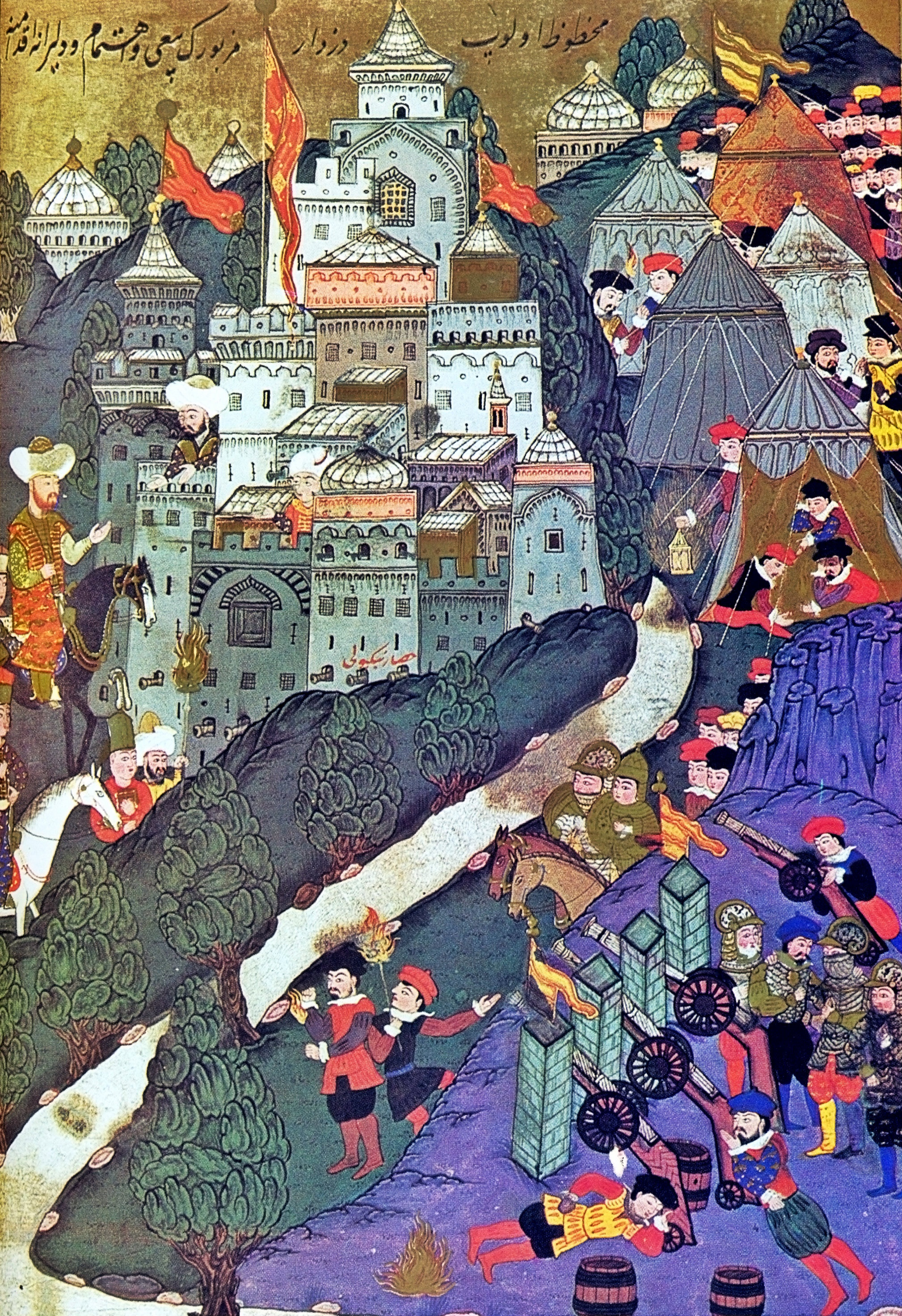
The Battle of Nicopolis in 1396, as depicted in an Ottoman miniature from 1523

As the Turks expanded into the Balkans, the conquest of Constantinople became a crucial objective. The Ottomans already controlled nearly all former Byzantine lands surrounding the city, but Constantinople's defenses and strategic position on the Bosporus Strait made it difficult to conquer. In 1402, the Byzantines were temporarily relieved when the Turco-Mongol leader Timur, founder of the Timurid Empire, invaded Ottoman Anatolia from the east. In the Battle of Ankara in 1402, Timur defeated Ottoman forces and took Sultan Bayezid I as prisoner, throwing the empire into disorder. The ensuing civil war lasted from 1402 to 1413 as Bayezid's sons fought over succession. It ended when Mehmed I emerged as the sultan.

The Balkan territories lost by the Ottomans after 1402, including Thessaloniki, Macedonia, and Kosovo, were recovered by Murad II between the 1430s and 1450s. On 10 November 1444, Murad repelled the Crusade of Varna by defeating the Hungarian, Polish, and Wallachian armies under Władysław III of Poland and John Hunyadi at the Battle of Varna, although Albanians under Skanderbeg continued to resist. Four years later, John Hunyadi prepared another army of Hungarian and Wallachian forces to attack the Turks, but was again defeated at the Second Battle of Kosovo in 1448.

In modern historiography, there is a direct connection between the rapid Ottoman advances and the Black Death from the mid-14th century onwards. Byzantine territories were exhausted demographically and militarily due to the plague, and this facilitated Ottoman expansion. In addition, slave hunting was a main economic motivation for the Ottomans. Some 21st-century authors re-periodise conquest of the Balkans into the akıncı phase, which spanned 8 to 13 decades, characterised by continuous slave hunting and destruction, followed by administrative integration into the Empire.

=== Expansion and peak (1453–1566) ===
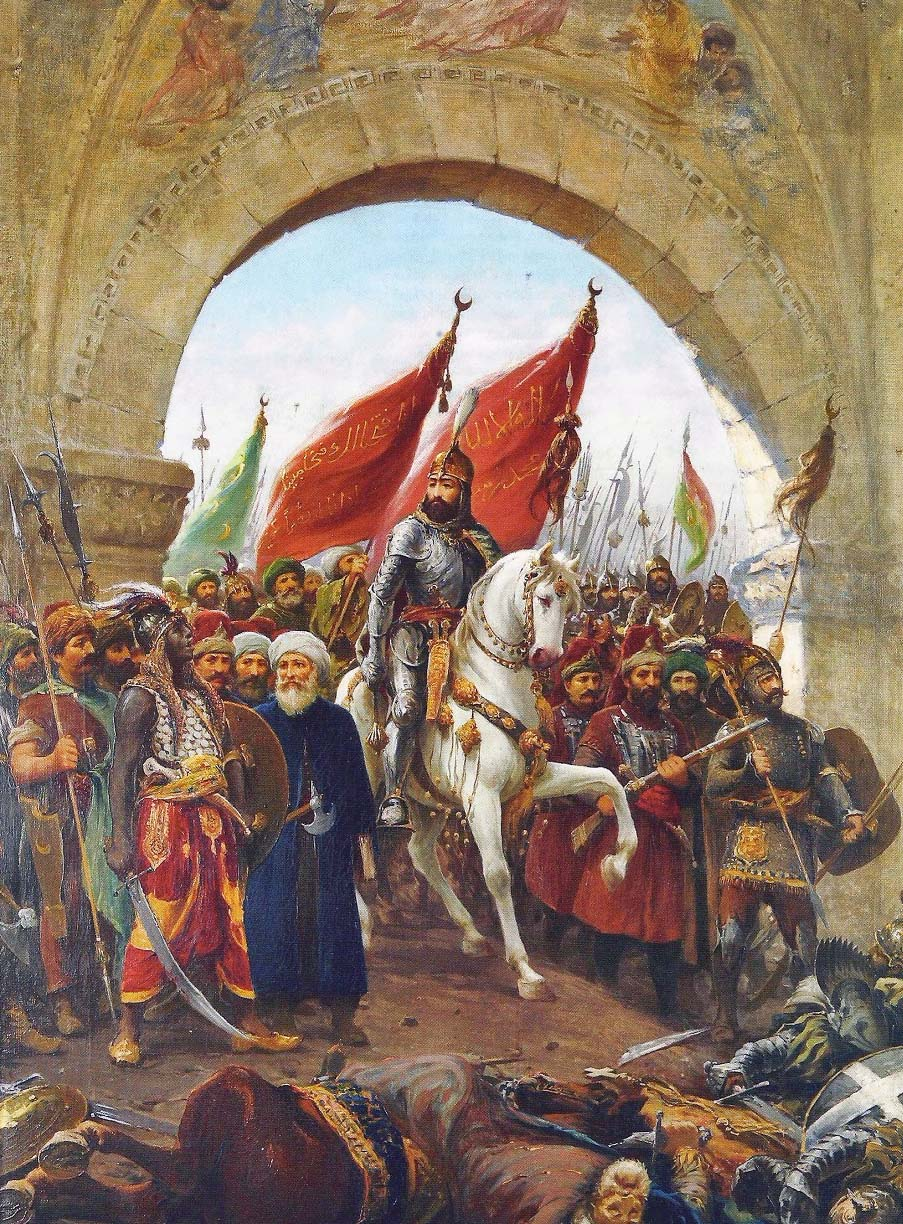
Sultan Mehmed the Conqueror's entry into Constantinople; painting by Fausto Zonaro (1854–1929)

The son of Murad II, Mehmed the Conqueror, reorganised both state and military, and on 29 May 1453 conquered Constantinople, ending the Byzantine Empire. Mehmed allowed the Eastern Orthodox Church to maintain its autonomy and land in exchange for accepting Ottoman authority. Due to tension between the states of western Europe and the later Byzantine Empire, most of the Orthodox population accepted Ottoman rule, as preferable to Venetian rule. Albanian resistance was a major obstacle to Ottoman expansion on the Italian peninsula.

In the 15th and 16th centuries, the Ottoman Empire entered a period of expansion. The Empire prospered under the rule of a line of committed and effective Sultans. It flourished economically due to its control of the major overland trade routes between Europe and Asia. (Note: A lock-hold on trade between western Europe and Asia is often cited as a primary motivation for Isabella I of Castile to fund Christopher Columbus's westward journey to find a sailing route to Asia and, more generally, for European seafaring nations to explore alternative trade routes (e.g., K.D. Madan, Life and travels of Vasco Da Gama (1998), 9; I. Stavans, Imagining Columbus: the literary voyage (2001), 5; W.B. Wheeler and S. Becker, Discovering the American Past. A Look at the Evidence: to 1877 (2006), 105). This traditional viewpoint has been attacked as unfounded in an influential article by A.H. Lybyer ("The Ottoman Turks and the Routes of Oriental Trade", English Historical Review, 120 (1915), 577–588), who sees the rise of Ottoman power and the beginnings of Portuguese and Spanish explorations as unrelated events. His view has not been universally accepted (cf. K.M. Setton, The Papacy and the Levant (1204–1571), Vol. 2: The Fifteenth Century (Memoirs of the American Philosophical Society, Vol. 127) (1978), 335).)

Sultan Selim I (1512–1520) dramatically expanded the eastern and southern frontiers by defeating Shah Ismail of Safavid Iran, in the Battle of Chaldiran. Selim I established Ottoman rule in Egypt by defeating and annexing the Mamluk Sultanate of Egypt and created a naval presence on the Red Sea. After this Ottoman expansion, competition began between the Portuguese Empire and the Ottomans to become the dominant power in the region.

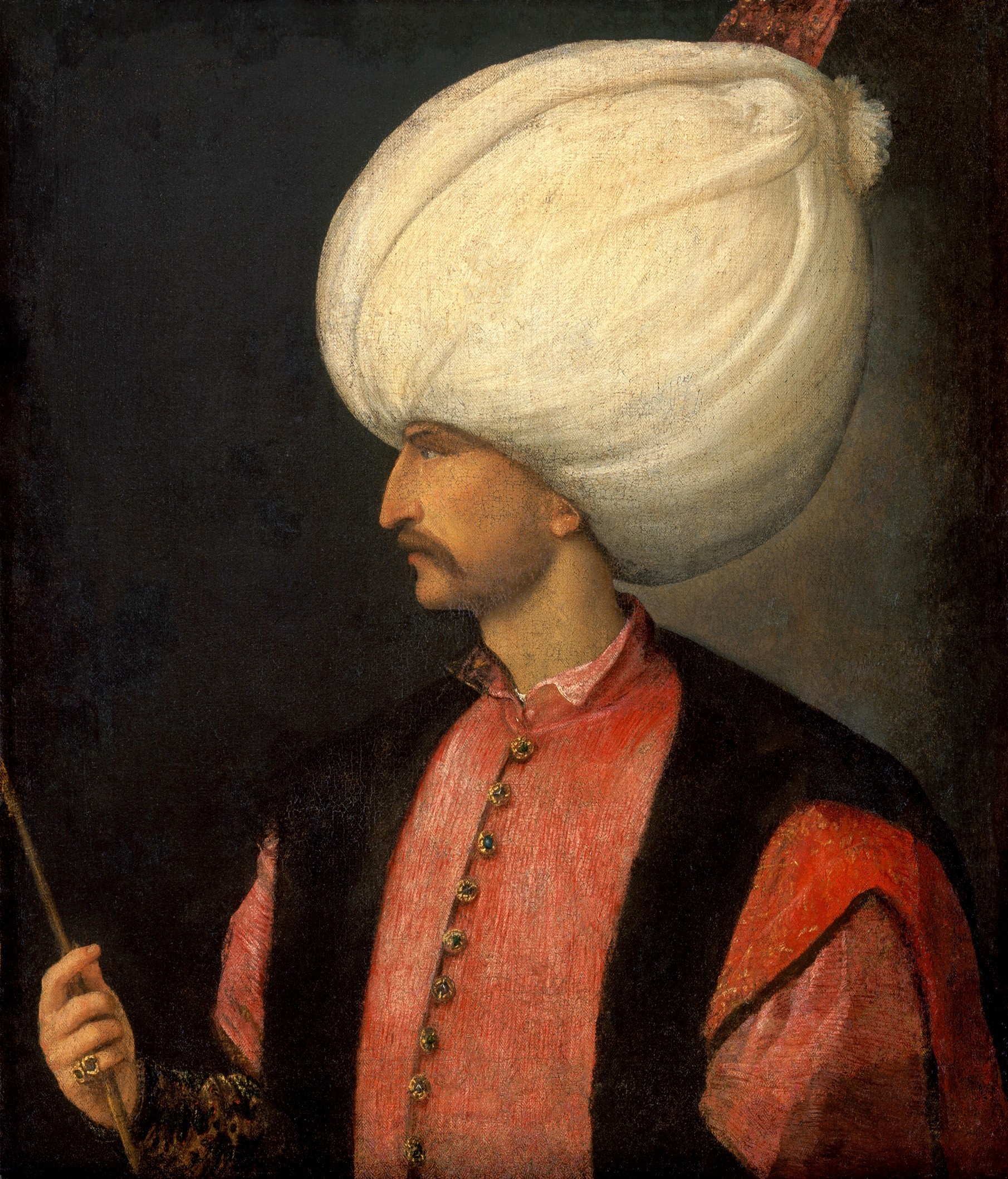
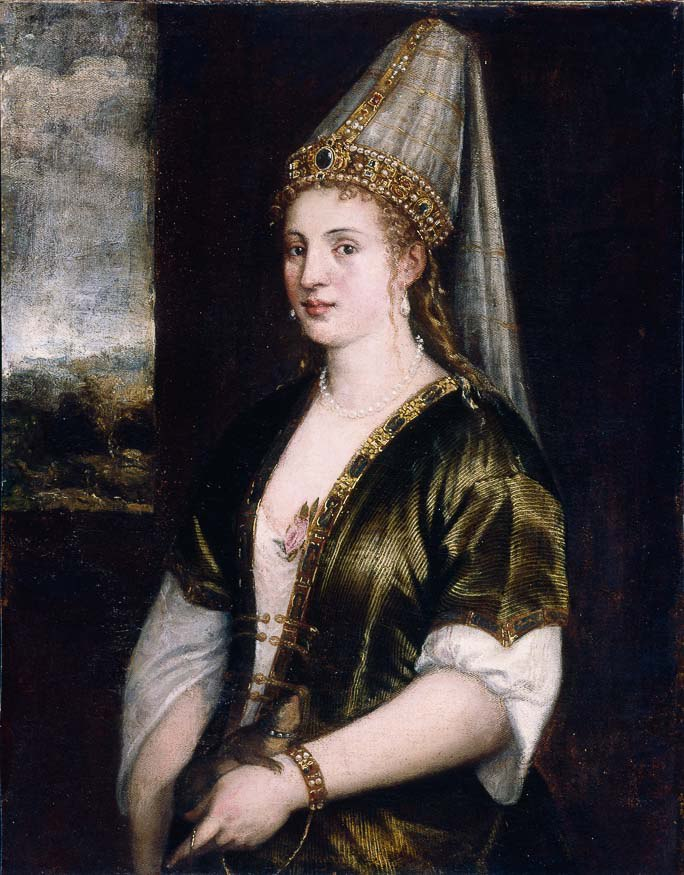
Suleiman the Magnificent and his wife Hürrem Sultan, by 16th-century Venetian painter Titian

Suleiman the Magnificent (1520–1566) captured Belgrade in 1521, conquered the southern and central parts of the Kingdom of Hungary as part of the Ottoman–Hungarian Wars, and, after his historic victory in the Battle of Mohács in 1526, he established Ottoman rule in the territory of present-day Hungary and other Central European territories. He then laid siege to Vienna in 1529, but failed to take the city. In 1532, he made another attack on Vienna, but was repulsed in the siege of Güns. Transylvania, Wallachia and, intermittently, Moldavia, became tributary principalities of the Empire. In the east, the Ottoman Turks took Baghdad from the Persians in 1535, establishing Ottoman rule in Iraq and gaining naval access to the Persian Gulf. After the end of the Ottoman–Safavid War (1532–1555), the Caucasus became partitioned for the first time between the Safavids and the Ottomans, a status quo that persisted until the Russian conquest of the Caucasus in the 19th century. By this partitioning as signed in the Peace of Amasya, Western Armenia, western Kurdistan, and Western Georgia fell into Ottoman hands, while southern Dagestan, Eastern Armenia, Eastern Georgia, and Azerbaijan remained Persian.

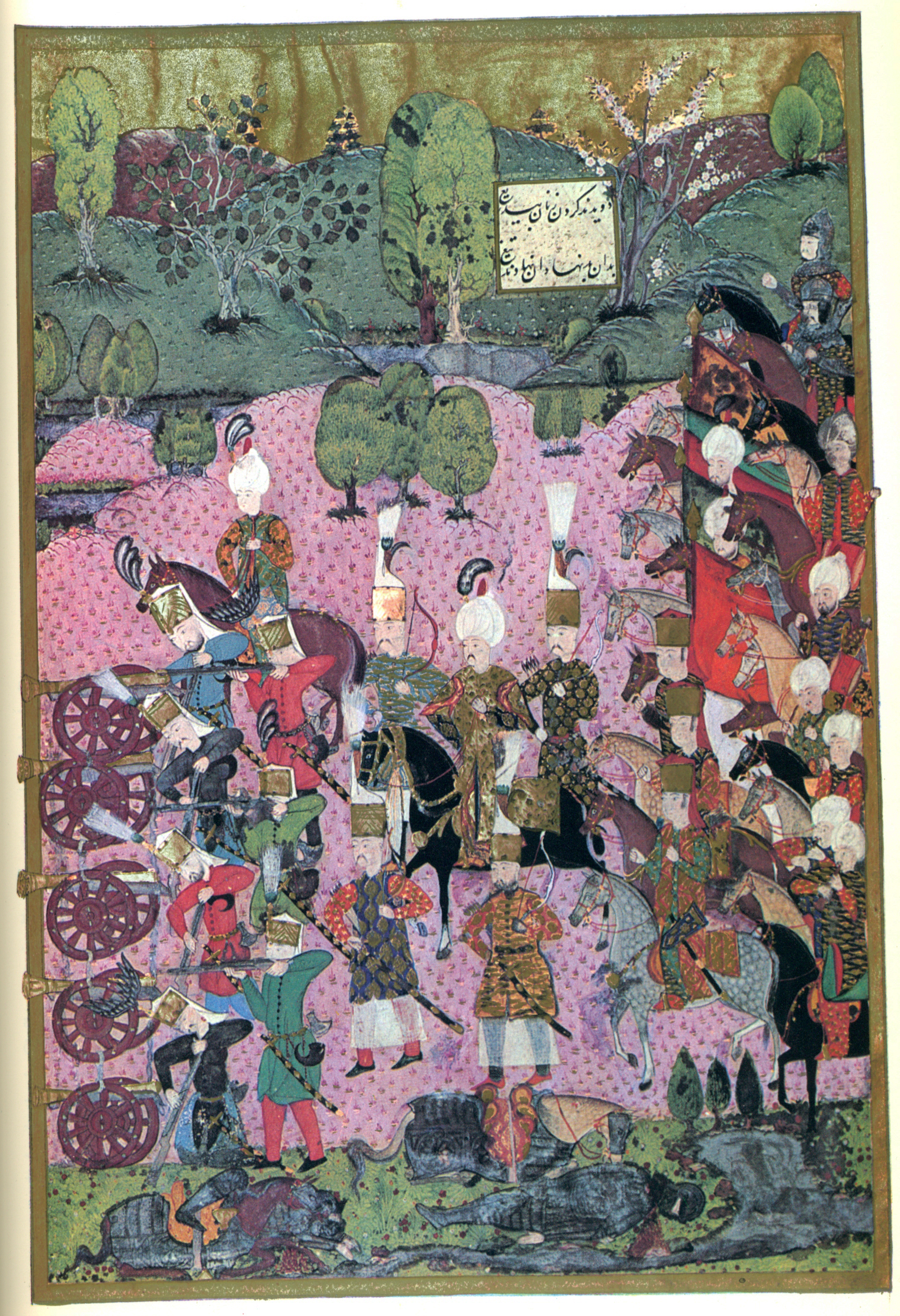
Ottoman miniature of the Battle of Mohács in 1526

In 1539, a 60,000-strong Ottoman army besieged the Spanish garrison of Castelnuovo on the Adriatic coast; the successful siege cost the Ottomans 8,000 casualties, but Venice agreed to terms in 1540, surrendering most of its empire in the Aegean and the Morea. France and the Ottoman Empire, united by mutual opposition to Habsburg rule, became allies. The French conquests of Nice (1543) and Corsica (1553) occurred as a joint venture between French king Francis I and Suleiman, and were commanded by the Ottoman admirals Hayreddin Barbarossa and Dragut. France supported the Ottomans with an artillery unit during the 1543 Ottoman conquest of Esztergom in northern Hungary. After further advances by the Turks, the Habsburg ruler Ferdinand officially recognised Ottoman ascendancy in Hungary in 1547. Suleiman died of natural causes during the siege of Szigetvár in 1566. Following his death, the Ottomans were said to be declining, although this has been rejected by many scholars. By the end of Suleiman's reign, the Empire spanned approximately 877,888 mi^{2} (2,273,720 km^{2}), extending over three continents.

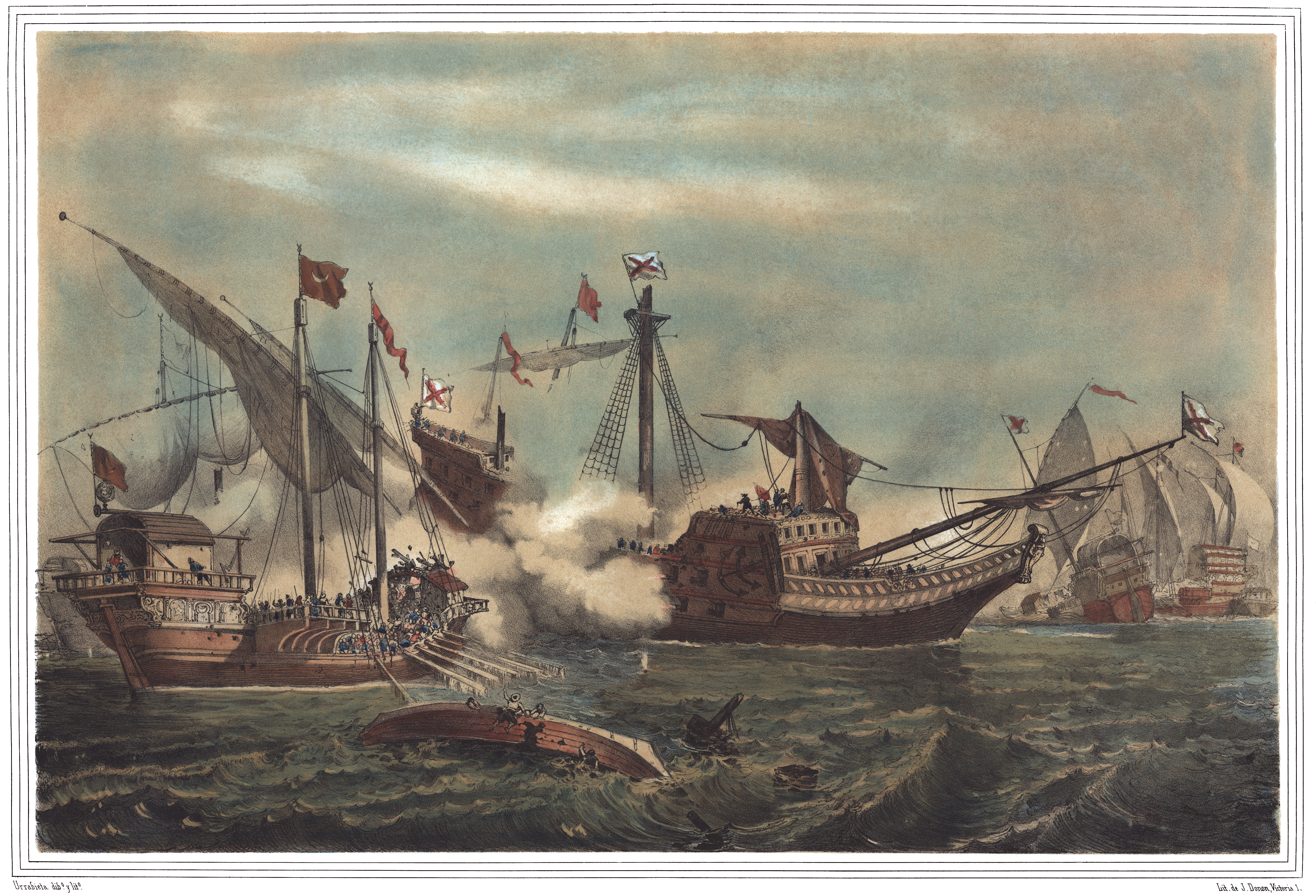
Ottoman admiral Barbarossa Hayreddin Pasha defeated the Holy League of Charles V under the command of Andrea Doria at the Battle of Preveza in 1538.

The Empire became a dominant naval force, controlling much of the Mediterranean Sea. The Empire was now a major part of European politics. The Ottomans became involved in multi-continental religious wars when Spain and Portugal were united under the Iberian Union. The Ottomans were holders of the Caliph title, meaning they were the leaders of Muslims worldwide. The Iberians were leaders of the Christian crusaders, and so the two fought in a worldwide conflict. There were zones of operations in the Mediterranean and Indian Ocean, where Iberians circumnavigated Africa to reach India and, on their way, wage war upon the Ottomans and their local Muslim allies. Likewise, the Iberians passed through newly-Christianised Latin America and had sent expeditions that traversed the Pacific to Christianise the formerly Muslim Philippines and use it as a base to attack the Muslims in the Far East. In this case, the Ottomans sent armies to aid its easternmost vassal and territory, the Sultanate of Aceh in Southeast Asia.

The Spanish–Ottoman wars took place primarily in the Mediterranean. Barbary corsairs from the North African cities of Algiers, Tunis, and Tripoli, which were nominally part of the Ottoman Empire, captured thousands of merchant ships and raided coastal towns in Europe, enslaving the people they captured.

During the 1600s, the world conflict between the Ottoman Caliphate and Iberian Union was a stalemate since both were at similar population, technology and economic levels. Nevertheless, the success of the Ottoman political and military establishment was compared to the Roman Empire, despite the difference in size, by the likes of contemporary Italian scholar Francesco Sansovino and French political philosopher Jean Bodin.

=== Stagnation and reform (1566–1827) ===
==== Revolts, reversals, and revivals (1566–1683) ====
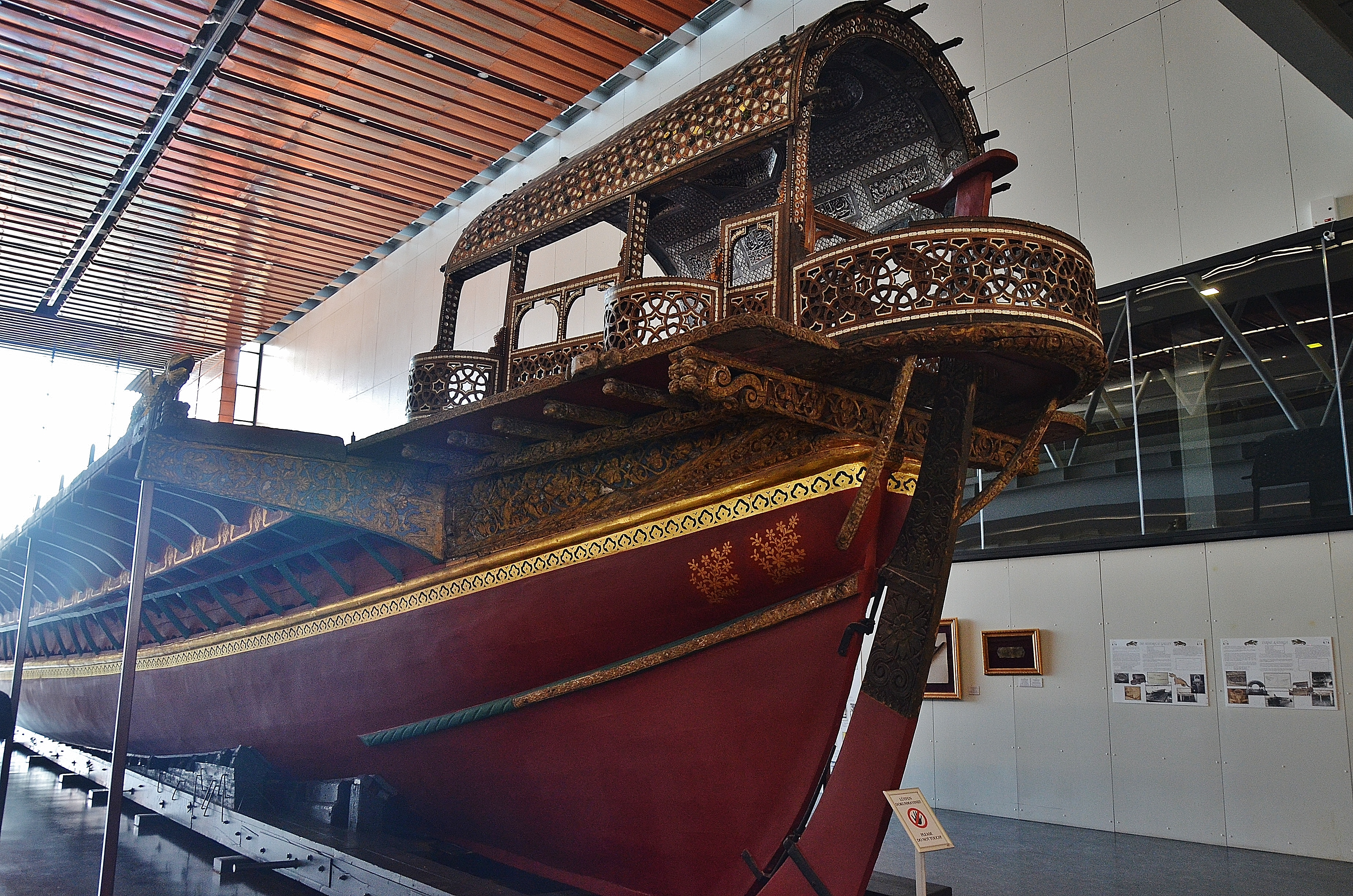
Late 16th or early 17th century Ottoman galley known as Tarihi Kadırga at the Istanbul Naval Museum, built in the period between the reigns of Sultan Murad III (1574–1595) and Sultan Mehmed IV (1648–1687)

In the second half of the 16th century, the Ottoman Empire came under increasing strain from inflation and the rapidly rising costs of warfare that were impacting both Europe and the Middle East. These pressures led to a series of crises around the year 1600, placing great strain upon the Ottoman system of government. The empire underwent a series of transformations of its political and military institutions in response to these challenges, enabling it to successfully adapt to the new conditions of the 17th century and remain powerful, both militarily and economically. Historians of the mid-20th century once characterised this period as one of stagnation and decline, but this view is now rejected by the majority of academics.

The discovery of new maritime trade routes by Western European states allowed them to avoid the Ottoman trade monopoly. The Portuguese discovery of the Cape of Good Hope in 1488 initiated a series of Ottoman-Portuguese naval wars in the Indian Ocean throughout the 16th century. Despite the growing European presence in the Indian Ocean, Ottoman trade with the east continued to flourish. Cairo, in particular, benefitted from the rise of Yemeni coffee as a popular consumer commodity. As coffeehouses appeared in cities and towns across the empire, Cairo developed into a major centre for its trade, contributing to its continued prosperity throughout the seventeenth and much of the 18th century.

Under Ivan IV (1533–1584), the Tsardom of Russia expanded into the Volga and Caspian regions at the expense of the Tatar khanates. In 1571, the Crimean khan Devlet I Giray, commanded by the Ottomans, invaded Russia and burned Moscow. The next year, the invasion was repeated but repelled at the Battle of Molodi. The Ottoman Empire and its vassal, the Crimean Khanate, continued to invade Eastern Europe in a series of slave raids, and remained a significant power in Eastern Europe until the end of the 17th century. The Crimean cavalry became indispensable for the Ottomans' campaigns against Russia, Poland, Hungary, and Persia.

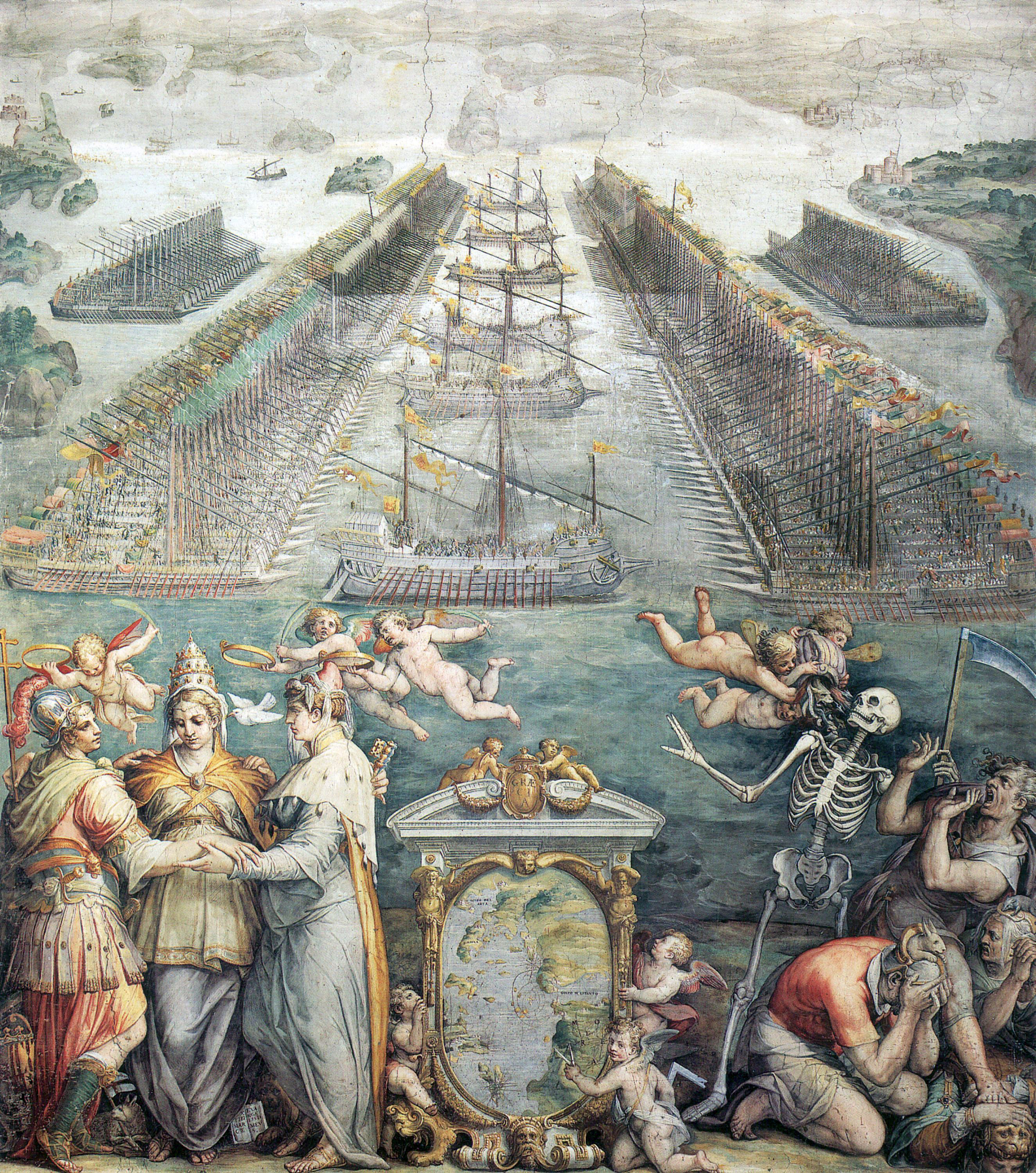
Order of battle of the two fleets in the Battle of Lepanto, with an allegory of the three powers of the Holy League in the foreground, fresco by Giorgio Vasari

The Ottomans decided to conquer Venetian Cyprus and on 22 July 1570, Nicosia was besieged; 50,000 Christians died, and 180,000 were enslaved. On 15 September 1570, the Ottoman cavalry appeared before the last Venetian stronghold in Cyprus, Famagusta. The Venetian defenders held out for 11 months against a force that at its peak numbered 200,000 men with 145 cannons; 163,000 cannonballs struck the walls of Famagusta before it fell to the Ottomans in August 1571. The Siege of Famagusta claimed 50,000 Ottoman casualties. Meanwhile, the Holy League consisting of mostly Spanish and Venetian fleets won a victory over the Ottoman fleet at the Battle of Lepanto (1571), off southwestern Greece; Catholic forces killed over 30,000 Turks and destroyed 200 of their ships. It was a startling, if mostly symbolic, blow to the image of Ottoman invincibility, an image which the victory of the Knights of Malta over the Ottoman invaders in the 1565 siege of Malta had recently set about eroding. The battle was far more damaging to the Ottoman navy in sapping experienced manpower than the loss of ships, which were rapidly replaced. The Ottoman navy recovered quickly, persuading Venice to sign a peace treaty in 1573, allowing the Ottomans to expand and consolidate their position in North Africa.

By contrast, the Habsburg frontier had settled somewhat, a stalemate caused by a stiffening of the Habsburg defences. The Long Turkish War against Habsburg Austria (1593–1606) created the need for greater numbers of Ottoman infantry equipped with firearms, resulting in a relaxation of recruitment policy. This contributed to problems of indiscipline and outright rebelliousness within the corps, which were never fully solved. Irregular sharpshooters (Sekban) were also recruited, and on demobilisation turned to brigandage in the Celali rebellions (1590–1610), which engendered widespread anarchy in Anatolia in the late 16th and early 17th centuries. With the Empire's population reaching 30 million people by 1600, the shortage of land placed further pressure on the government. In spite of these problems, the Ottoman state remained strong, and its army did not collapse or suffer crushing defeats. The only exceptions were campaigns against the Safavid dynasty of Persia, where many of the Ottoman eastern provinces were lost, some permanently. This 1603–1618 war eventually resulted in the Treaty of Nasuh Pasha, which ceded the entire Caucasus, except westernmost Georgia, back into the possession of Safavid Iran. The treaty ending the Cretan War cost Venice much of Dalmatia, its Aegean island possessions, and Crete.

During his brief majority reign, Murad IV (1623–1640) reasserted central authority and recaptured Iraq (1639) from the Safavids. The resulting Treaty of Zuhab of that same year decisively divided the Caucasus and adjacent regions between the two neighbouring empires as it had already been defined in the 1555 Peace of Amasya.

The Sultanate of Women (1533–1656) was a period during which imperial women, especially the consorts and mothers of sultans, exercised significant political influence in the Ottoman Empire. The most prominent women of this period were Hürrem Sultan, Kösem Sultan and her daughter-in-law Turhan Hatice, whose political rivalry culminated in Kösem's murder in 1651. During the Köprülü era (1656–1703), effective control of the Empire was exercised by a sequence of grand viziers from the Köprülü family. The Köprülü Vizierate saw renewed military success with authority restored in Transylvania, the conquest of Crete completed in 1669, and expansion into Polish southern Ukraine, with the strongholds of Khotyn, and Kamianets-Podilskyi and the territory of Podolia ceding to an Ottoman controlled Podolia Eyalet in 1676.

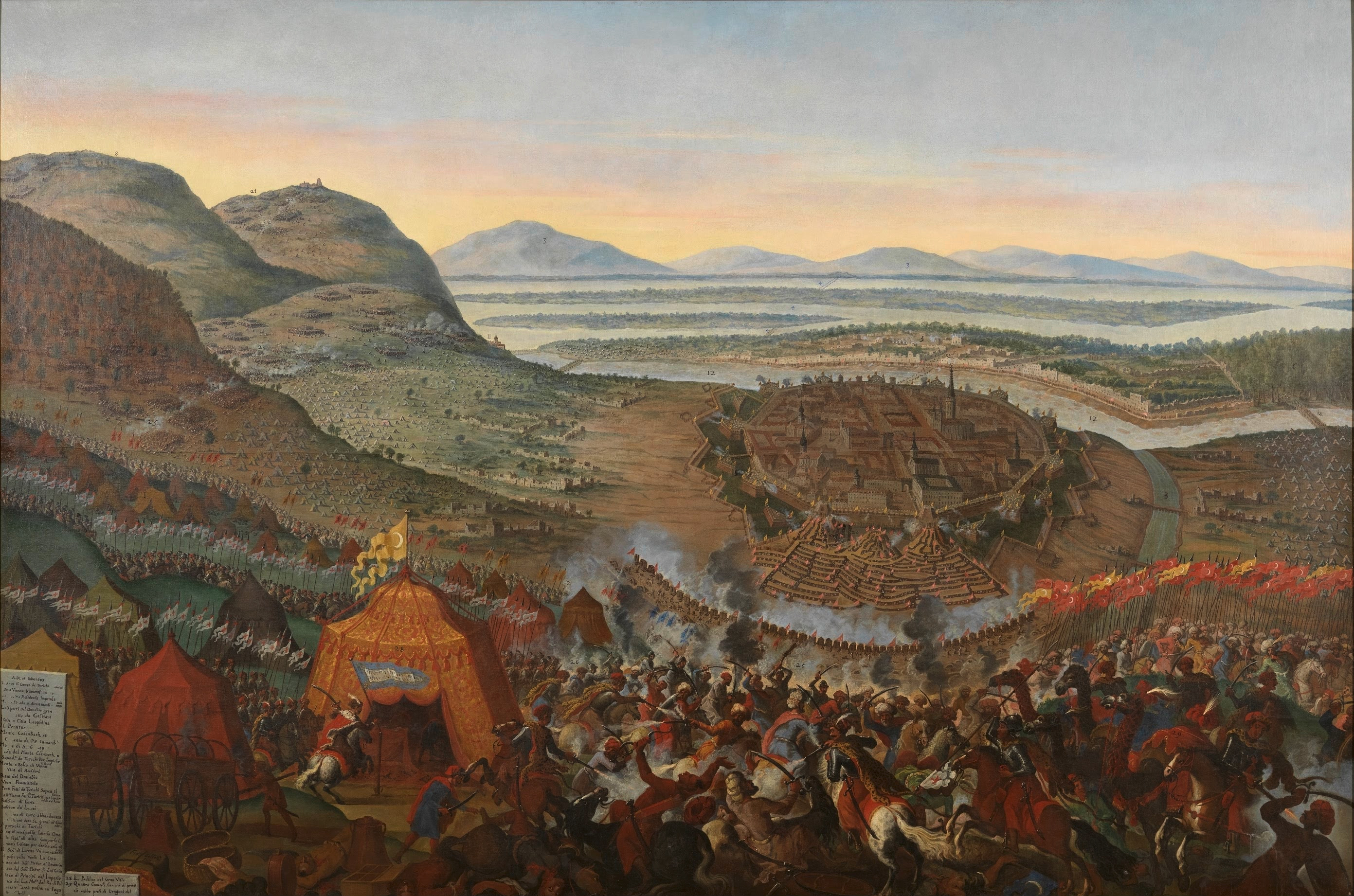
The Second Siege of Vienna in 1683, by Frans Geffels (1624–1694)

This period of renewed assertiveness came to a calamitous end in 1683 when Grand Vizier Kara Mustafa Pasha led a huge army to attempt a second Ottoman siege of Vienna in the Great Turkish War of 1683–1699. The final assault being fatally delayed, the Ottoman forces were swept away by allied Habsburg, German, and Polish forces spearheaded by the Polish king John III Sobieski at the Battle of Vienna. The alliance of the Holy League pressed home the advantage of the defeat at Vienna, culminating in the Treaty of Karlowitz (26 January 1699), which ended the Great Turkish War. The Ottomans surrendered control of significant territories, many permanently. Mustafa II (1695–1703) led the counterattack of 1695–1696 against the Habsburgs in Hungary, but was undone at the disastrous defeat at Zenta (in modern Serbia), 11 September 1697.

==== Military defeats ====
Aside from the loss of the Banat and the temporary loss of Belgrade (1717–1739), the Ottoman border on the Danube and Sava remained stable during the 18th century. Russian expansion, however, presented a large and growing threat. Accordingly, King Charles XII of Sweden was welcomed as an ally in the Ottoman Empire following his defeat by the Russians at the Battle of Poltava of 1709 in central Ukraine (part of the Great Northern War of 1700–1721). Charles XII persuaded the Ottoman Sultan Ahmed III to declare war on Russia, which resulted in an Ottoman victory in the Pruth River Campaign of 1710–1711, in Moldavia.

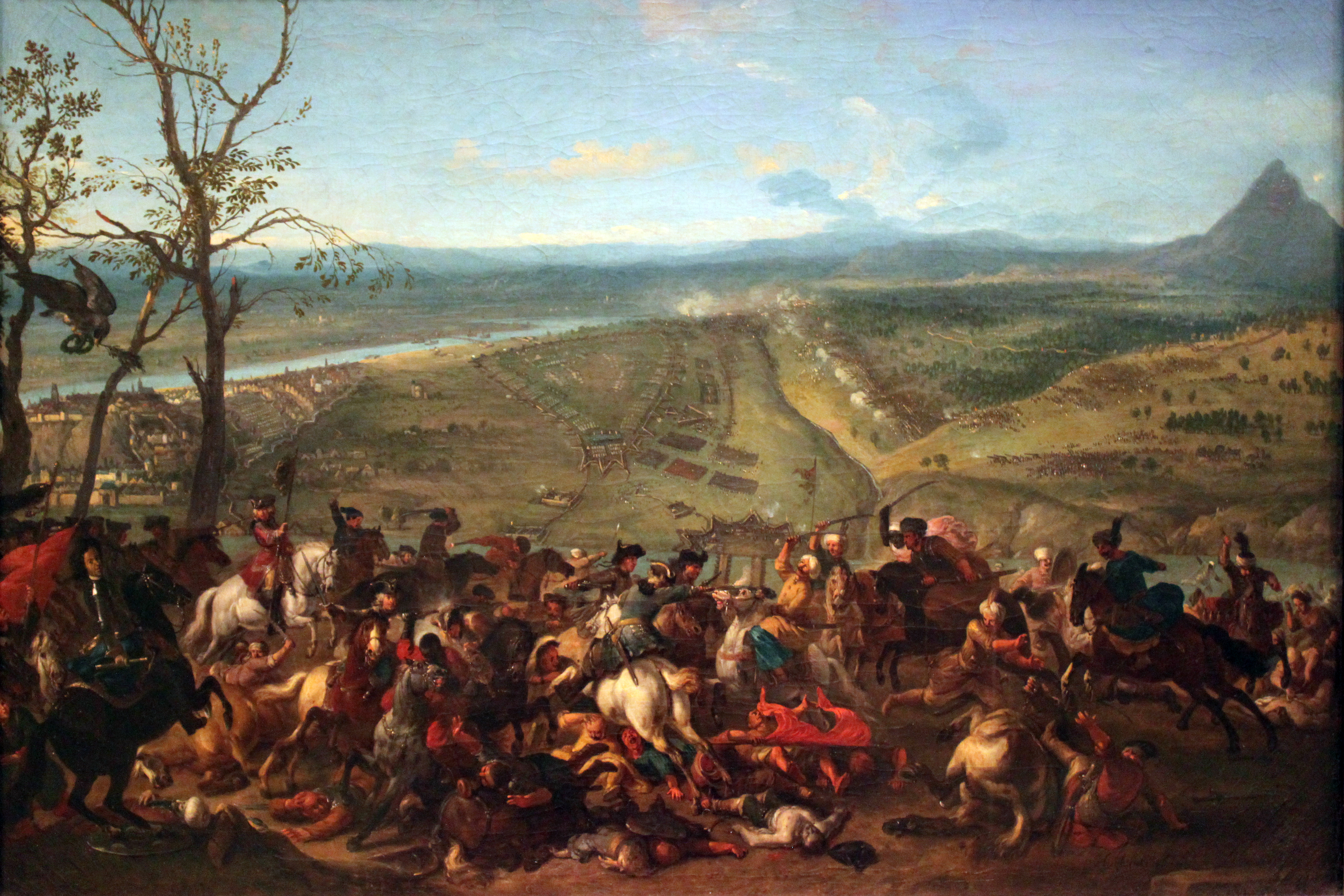
Austrian troops led by Prince Eugene of Savoy capture Belgrade in 1717. Austrian control in Serbia lasted until the Turkish victory in the Austro-Russian–Turkish War (1735–1739). With the 1739 Treaty of Belgrade, the Ottoman Empire regained northern Bosnia, Habsburg Serbia (including Belgrade), Oltenia and the southern parts of the Banat of Temeswar.

After the Austro-Turkish War, the Treaty of Passarowitz confirmed the loss of the Banat, Serbia, and "Little Walachia" (Oltenia) to Austria. The Treaty also revealed that the Ottoman Empire was on the defensive and unlikely to present any further aggression in Europe. The Austro-Russian–Turkish War (1735–1739), which was ended by the Treaty of Belgrade in 1739, resulted in the Ottoman recovery of northern Bosnia, Habsburg Serbia (including Belgrade), Oltenia and the southern parts of the Banat of Temeswar; but the Empire lost the port of Azov, north of the Crimean Peninsula, to the Russians. After this treaty the Ottoman Empire was able to enjoy a generation of peace in Europe, as Austria and Russia were forced to deal with the rise of Prussia.

Educational and technological reforms came about, including the establishment of higher education institutions such as the Istanbul Technical University. In 1734 an artillery school was established to impart Western-style artillery methods, but the Islamic clergy successfully objected under the grounds of theodicy. In 1754 the artillery school was reopened on a semi-secret basis. In 1726, Ibrahim Muteferrika convinced the Grand Vizier Nevşehirli Damat Ibrahim Pasha, the Grand Mufti, and the clergy on the efficiency of the printing press, and Muteferrika was later granted by Sultan Ahmed III permission to publish non-religious books (despite opposition from some calligraphers and religious leaders). Muteferrika's press published its first book in 1729 and, by 1743, issued 17 works in 23 volumes, each having between 500 and 1,000 copies.

In North Africa, Spain conquered Oran from the autonomous Deylik of Algiers. The Bey of Oran received an army from Algiers, but it failed to recapture Oran; the siege caused the deaths of 1,500 Spaniards, and even more Algerians. The Spanish also massacred many Muslim soldiers. In 1792, Spain abandoned Oran, selling it to the Deylik of Algiers.

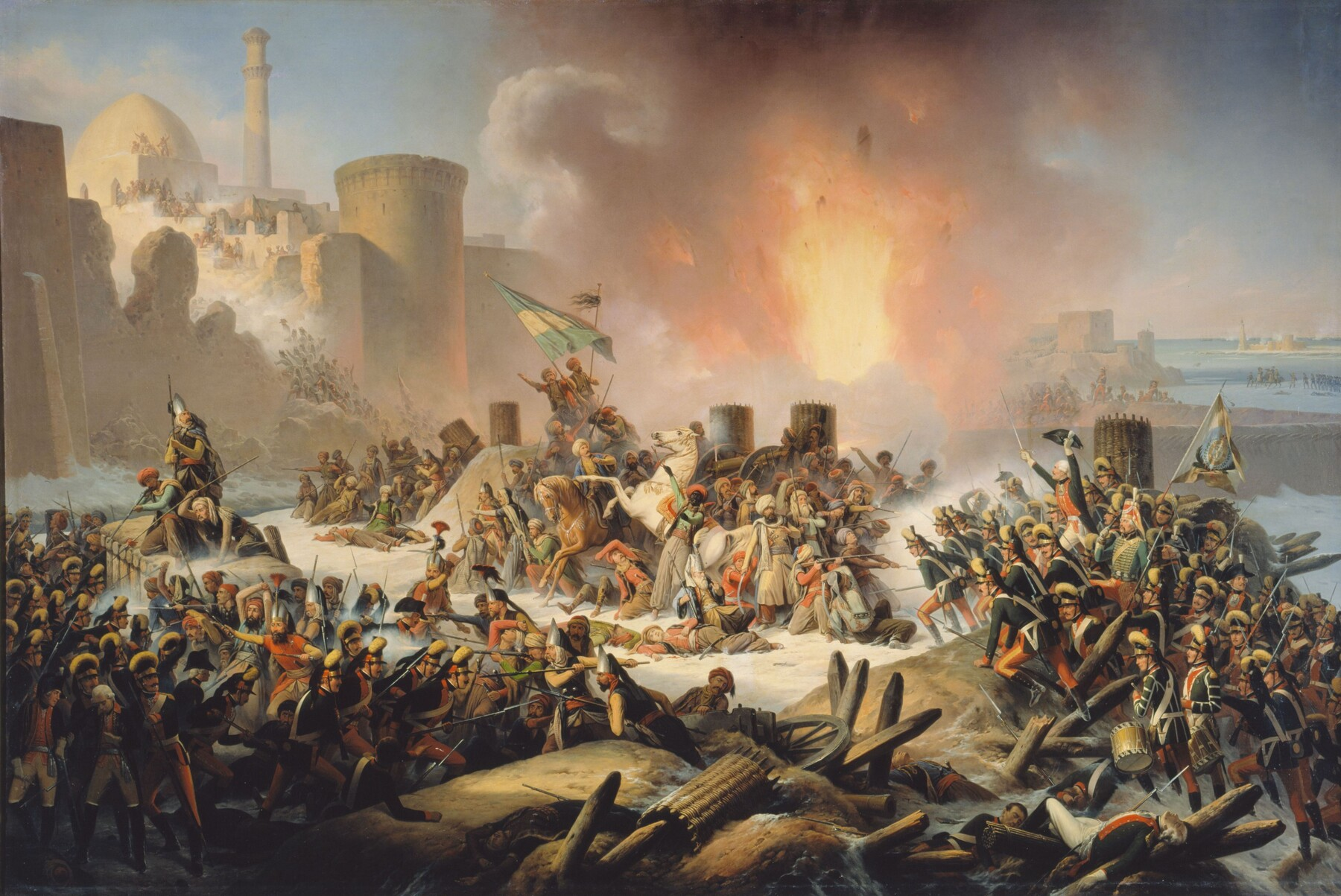
Ottoman troops attempting to halt the advancing Russians during the Siege of Ochakov in 1788

In 1768 Russian-backed Ukrainian Haidamakas, pursuing Polish confederates, entered Balta, an Ottoman-controlled town on the border of Bessarabia in Ukraine, massacred its citizens, and burned the town to the ground. This action provoked the Ottoman Empire into the Russo-Turkish War of 1768–1774. The Treaty of Küçük Kaynarca of 1774 ended the war and provided freedom of worship for the Christian citizens of the Ottoman-controlled provinces of Wallachia and Moldavia. By the late 18th century, after a number of defeats in the wars with Russia, some people in the Ottoman Empire began to conclude that the reforms of Peter the Great had given the Russians an edge, and the Ottomans would have to keep up with Western technology in order to avoid further defeats.

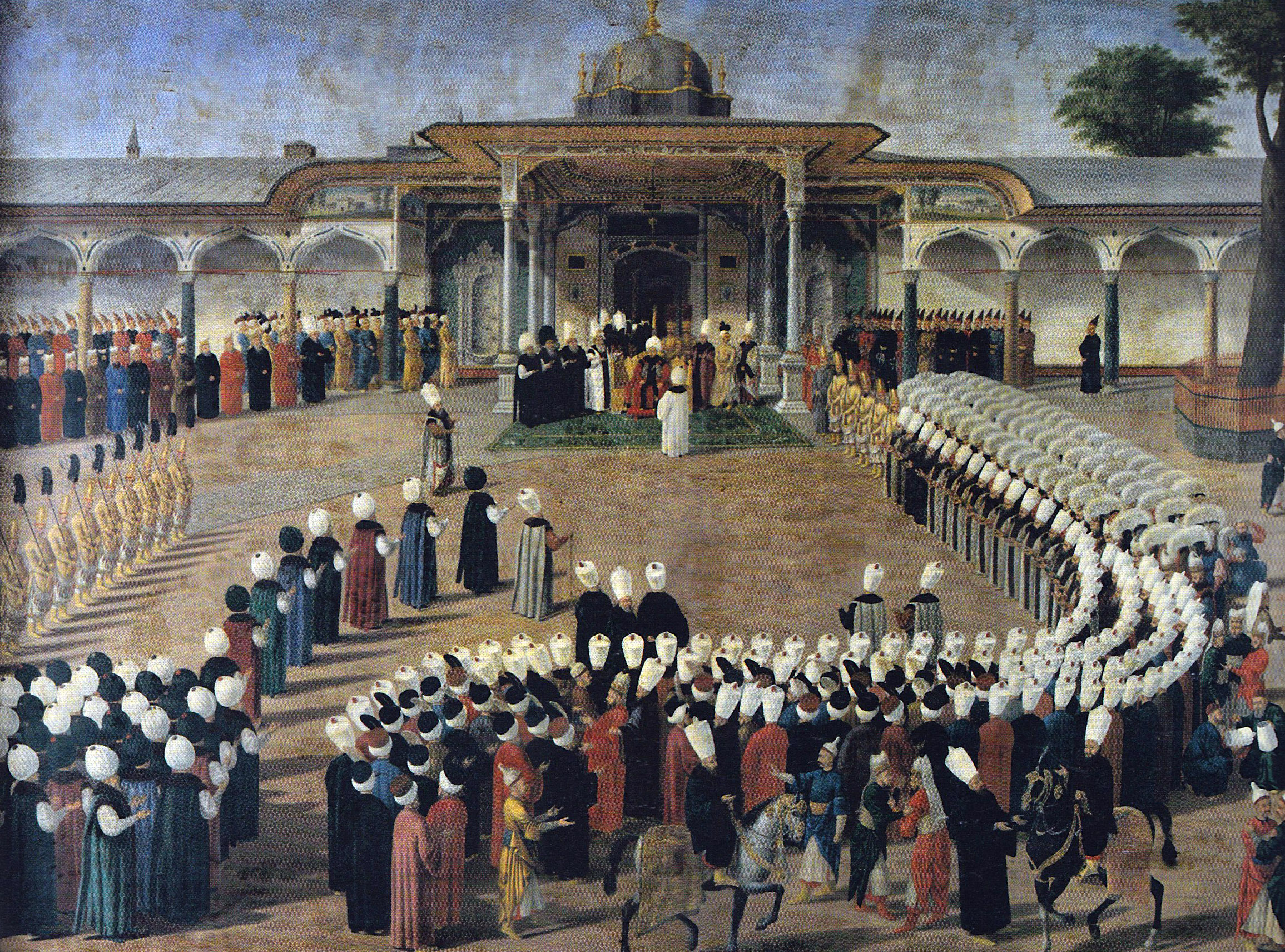
Selim III receiving dignitaries during an audience at the Gate of Felicity, Topkapı Palace. Painting by Konstantin Kapıdağlı.

Selim III (1789–1807) made the first major attempts to modernise the army, but his reforms were hampered by the religious leadership and the Janissary corps. Jealous of their privileges and firmly opposed to change, the Janissary revolted. Selim's efforts cost him his throne and his life, but were resolved in spectacular and bloody fashion by his successor, the dynamic Mahmud II, who eliminated the Janissary corps in 1826.

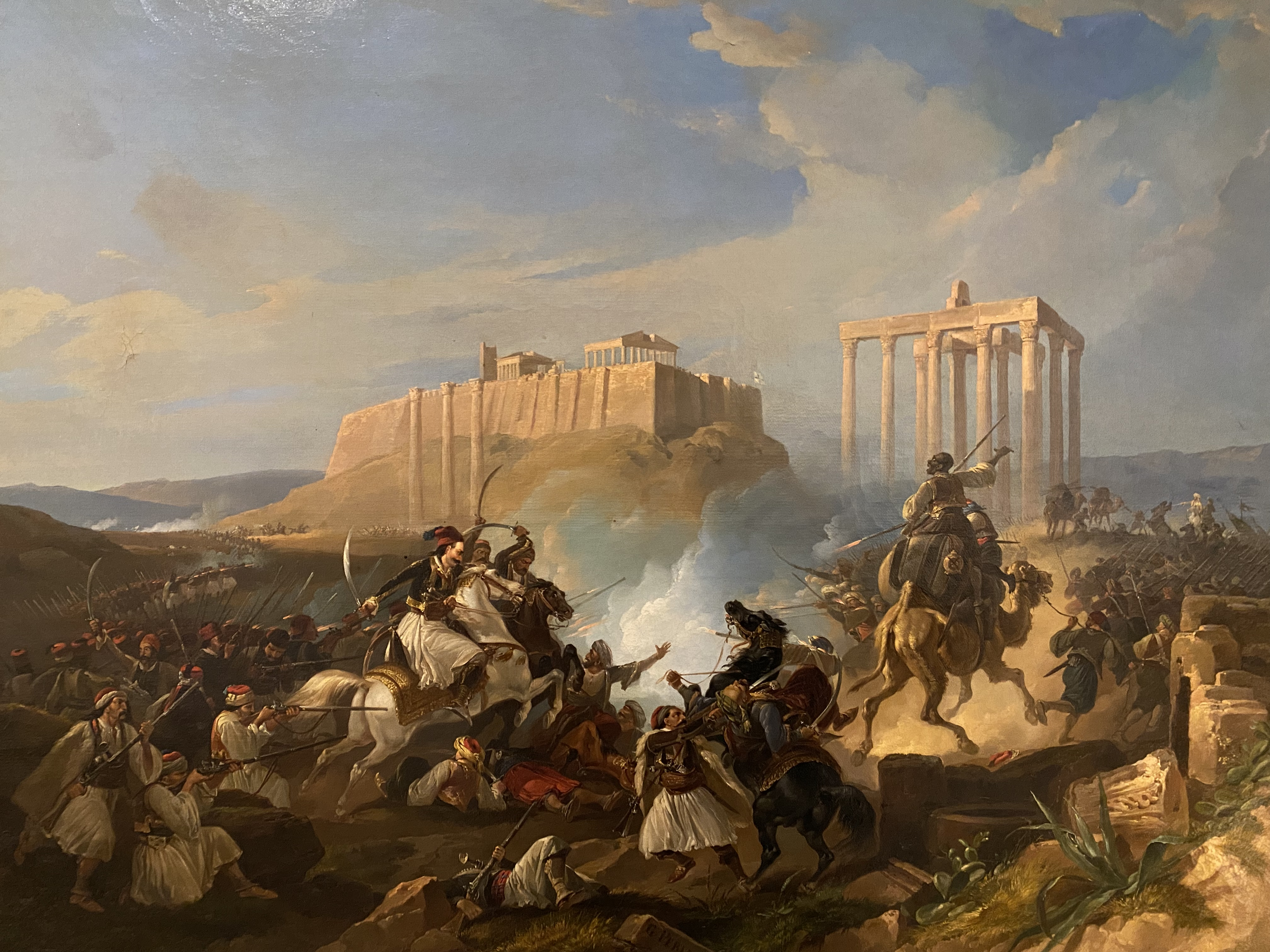
The siege of the Acropolis in 1826–1827 during the Greek War of Independence

The Serbian revolution (1804–1815) marked the beginning of an era of national awakening in the Balkans during the Eastern Question. In 1811, the fundamentalist Wahhabis of Arabia, led by the al-Saud family, revolted against the Ottomans. Unable to defeat the Wahhabi rebels, the Sublime Porte had Muhammad Ali Pasha of Kavala, the vali (governor) of the Eyalet of Egypt, tasked with retaking Arabia, which ended with the destruction of the Emirate of Diriyah in 1818. The suzerainty of Serbia as a hereditary monarchy under its own dynasty was acknowledged de jure in 1830. In 1821, the Greeks declared war on the Sultan. A rebellion that originated in Moldavia as a diversion was followed by the main revolution in the Peloponnese, which, along with the northern part of the Gulf of Corinth, became the first parts of the Ottoman Empire to achieve independence (in 1829). In 1830, the French invaded the Deylik of Algiers. The campaign took 21 days, and resulted in over 5,000 Algerian military casualties, and about 2,600 French ones. Before the French invasion the total population of Algeria was most likely between 3,000,000 and 5,000,000. By 1873, the population of Algeria (excluding several hundred thousand newly arrived French settlers) had decreased to 2,172,000. In 1831, Muhammad Ali of Egypt revolted against Sultan Mahmud II due to the latter's refusal to grant him the governorships of Greater Syria and Crete, which the Sultan had promised him in exchange for sending military assistance to put down the Greek revolt (1821–1829) that ultimately ended with the formal independence of Greece in 1830. It was a costly enterprise for Muhammad Ali, who had lost his fleet at the Battle of Navarino in 1827. Thus began the first Egyptian–Ottoman War (1831–1833), during which the French-trained army of Muhammad Ali, under the command of his son Ibrahim Pasha, defeated the Ottoman Army as it marched into Anatolia, reaching the city of Kütahya within 320 km (200 mi) of the capital, Constantinople. In desperation, Sultan Mahmud II appealed to the empire's traditional arch-rival Russia for help, asking Emperor Nicholas I to send an expeditionary force to assist him. In return for signing the Treaty of Hünkâr İskelesi, the Russians sent the expeditionary force which deterred Ibrahim Pasha from marching any further towards Constantinople. Under the terms of the Convention of Kütahya, signed on 5 May 1833, Muhammad Ali agreed to abandon his campaign against the Sultan, in exchange for which he was made the vali (governor) of the vilayets (provinces) of Crete, Aleppo, Tripoli, Damascus and Sidon (the latter four comprising modern Syria and Lebanon), and given the right to collect taxes in Adana. Had it not been for the Russian intervention, Sultan Mahmud II could have faced the risk of being overthrown and Muhammad Ali could have even become the new Sultan. These events marked the beginning of a recurring pattern where the Sublime Porte needed the help of foreign powers to protect itself.

In 1839, the Sublime Porte attempted to take back what it lost to the de facto autonomous, but de jure still Ottoman Eyalet of Egypt, but its forces were initially defeated, which led to the Oriental Crisis of 1840. Muhammad Ali had close relations with France, and the prospect of him becoming the Sultan of Egypt was widely viewed as putting the entire Levant into the French sphere of influence. As the Sublime Porte had proved itself incapable of defeating Muhammad Ali, the British Empire and Austrian Empire provided military assistance, and the second Egyptian–Ottoman War (1839–1841) ended with Ottoman victory and the restoration of Ottoman suzerainty over Egypt Eyalet and the Levant.

By the mid-19th century, the Ottoman Empire was called the "sick man of Europe". Three suzerain states – the Principality of Serbia, Wallachia and Moldavia – moved towards de jure independence during the 1860s and 1870s.

=== Decline and modernisation (1828–1908) ===
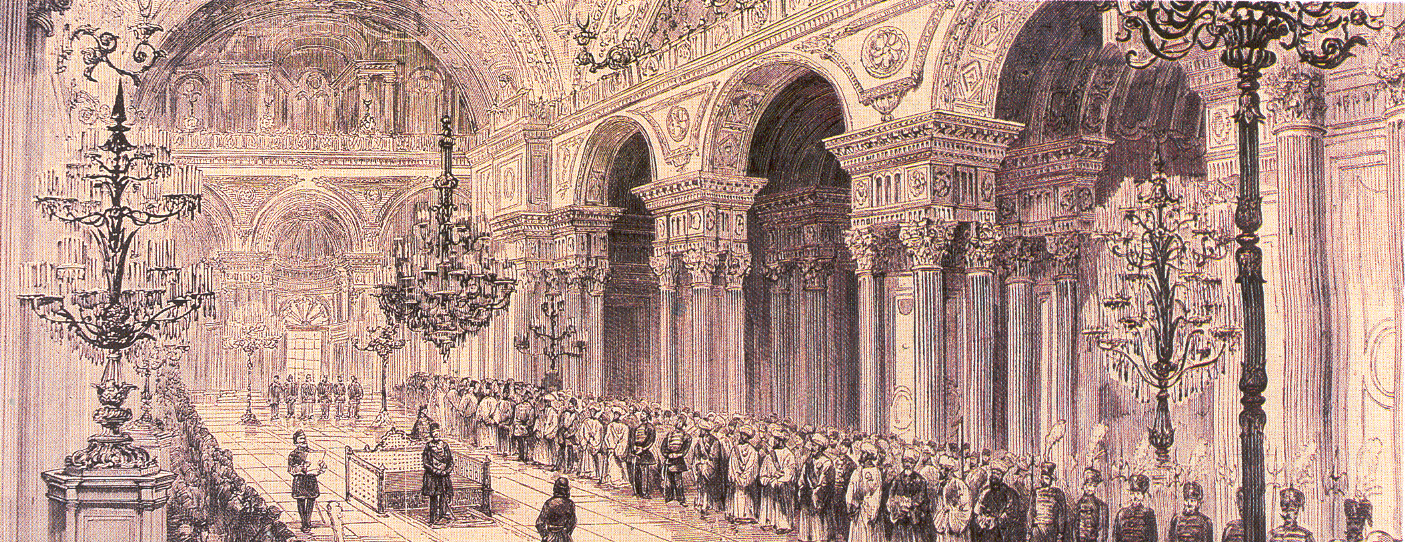
Opening ceremony of the First Ottoman Parliament at the Dolmabahçe Palace in 1876. The First Constitutional Era lasted only two years until 1878. The Ottoman Constitution and Parliament were restored 30 years later with the Young Turk Revolution in 1908.

During the Tanzimat period (1839–1876), the government's series of constitutional reforms led to a fairly modern conscripted army, banking system reforms, the decriminalisation of homosexuality, the replacement of religious law with secular law, and guilds with modern factories. The Ottoman Ministry of Post was established in Istanbul in 1840. American inventor Samuel Morse received an Ottoman patent for the telegraph in 1847, issued by Sultan Abdülmecid, who personally tested the invention. The reformist period peaked with the Constitution, called the Kanûn-u Esâsî. The empire's First Constitutional era was short-lived. The parliament survived for only two years before the sultan suspended it.

The empire's Christian population, owing to their higher educational levels, started to pull ahead of the Muslim majority, leading to much resentment. In 1861, there were 571 primary and 94 secondary schools for Ottoman Christians, with 140,000 pupils in total, a figure that vastly exceeded the number of Muslim children in school at the time, who were further hindered by the amount of time spent learning Arabic and Islamic theology. Author Norman Stone suggests that the Arabic alphabet, in which Turkish was written until 1928, was ill-suited to reflect the sounds of Turkish (which is a Turkic as opposed to Semitic language), which imposed further difficulty on Turkish children. In turn, Christians' higher educational levels allowed them to play a larger role in the economy, with the rise in prominence of groups such as the Sursock family indicative of this. In 1911, of the 654 wholesale companies in Istanbul, 528 were owned by ethnic Greeks. In many cases, Christians and Jews gained protection from European consuls and citizenship, meaning they were protected from Ottoman law and not subject to the same economic regulations as their Muslim counterparts.

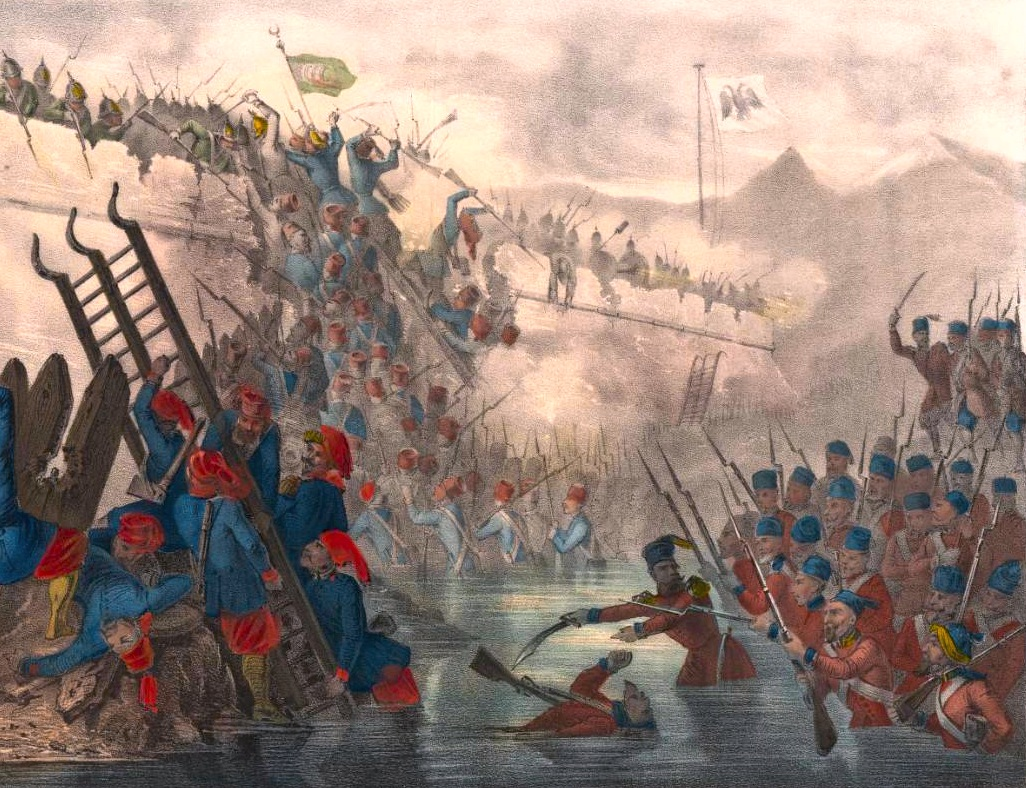
Ottoman troops storming Fort Shefketil during the Crimean War of 1853–1856

The Crimean War (1853–1856) was part of a long-running contest between the major European powers for influence over territories of the declining Ottoman Empire. The financial burden of the war led the Ottoman state to issue foreign loans amounting to 5 million pounds sterling on 4 August 1854. The war caused an exodus of the Crimean Tatars, about 200,000 of whom moved to the Ottoman Empire in continuing waves of emigration. Toward the end of the Caucasian Wars, 90% of the Circassians were ethnically cleansed and exiled from their homelands in the Caucasus, fleeing to the Ottoman Empire, resulting in the settlement of 500,000 to 700,000 Circassians in the Ottoman Empire. Crimean Tatar refugees in the late 19th century played an especially notable role in seeking to modernise Ottoman education and in first promoting both Pan-Turkism and a sense of Turkish nationalism.

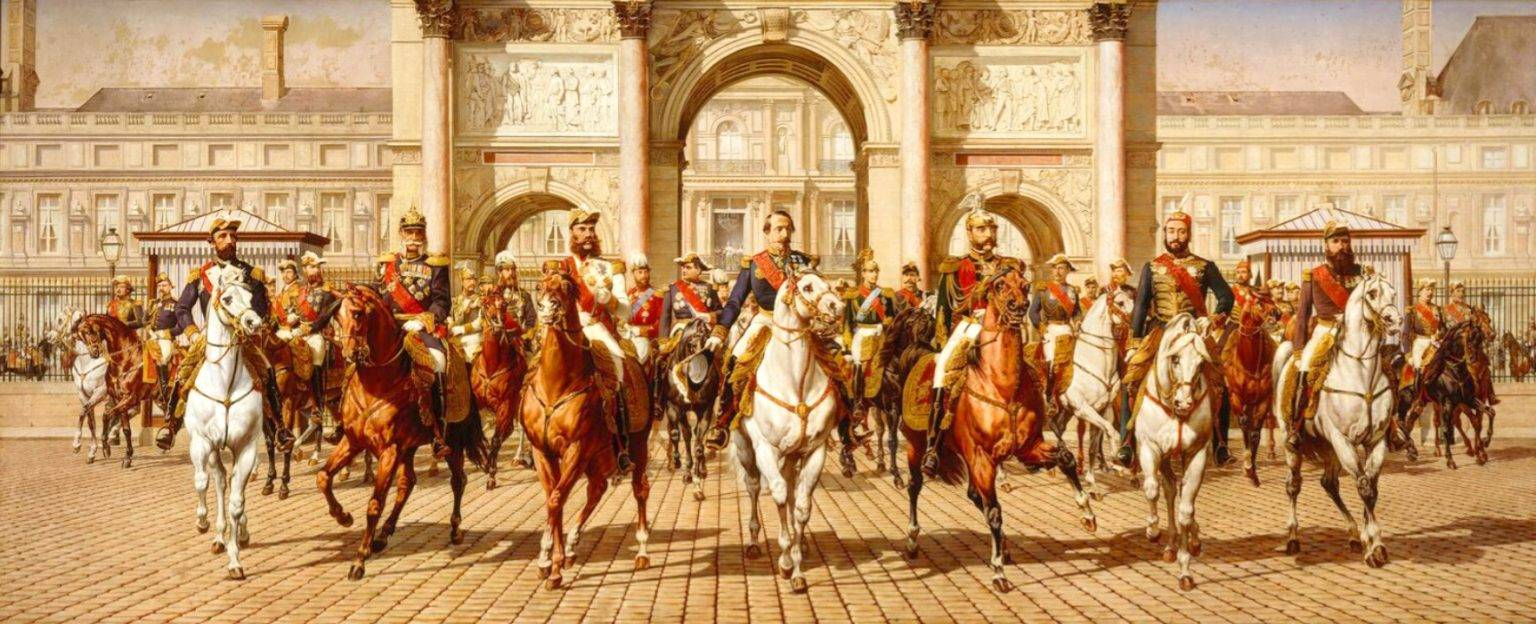
The monarchs of Europe in Paris (Napoleon III is at the centre, Sultan Abdulaziz is second from right), fictional representation of the opening of the Universal Exposition of 1867.

In this period, the Ottoman Empire spent only small amounts of public funds on education; for example, in 1860–1861 only 0.2% of the total budget was invested in education. As the Ottoman state attempted to modernise its infrastructure and army in response to outside threats, it opened itself up to a different kind of threat: that of creditors. As the historian Eugene Rogan has written, "the single greatest threat to the independence of the Middle East" in the 19th century "was not the armies of Europe but its banks". The Ottoman state, which had begun taking on debt with the Crimean War, was forced to declare bankruptcy in 1875. By 1881, the Ottoman Empire agreed to have its debt controlled by the Ottoman Public Debt Administration, a council of European men with presidency alternating between France and Britain. The body controlled swaths of the Ottoman economy, and used its position to ensure that European capital continued to penetrate the empire, often to the detriment of local Ottoman interests.

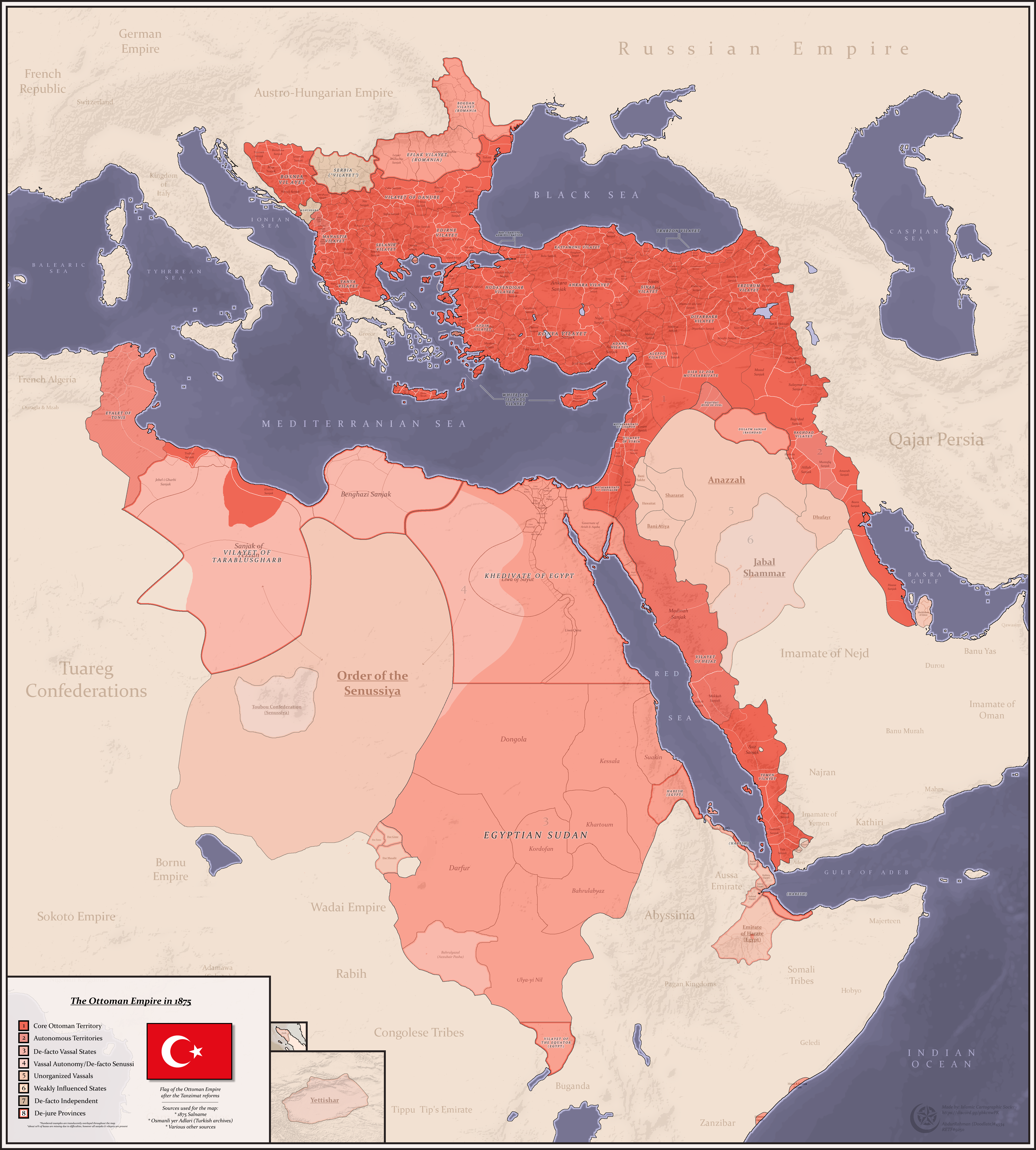
The Ottoman Empire in 1875 under Sultan Abdulaziz

The Ottoman bashi-bazouks suppressed the Bulgarian uprising of 1876, massacring up to 100,000 people in the process. The Russo-Turkish War (1877–1878) ended with a decisive victory for Russia. As a result, Ottoman holdings in Europe declined sharply: Bulgaria was established as an independent principality inside the Ottoman Empire; Romania achieved full independence; and Serbia and Montenegro finally gained complete independence, but with smaller territories. In 1878, Austria-Hungary unilaterally occupied the Ottoman provinces of Bosnia-Herzegovina and Novi Pazar.

British Prime Minister Benjamin Disraeli advocated restoring the Ottoman territories on the Balkan Peninsula during the Congress of Berlin, and in return, Britain assumed the administration of Cyprus in 1878. Britain later sent troops to Egypt in 1882 to put down the Urabi Revolt (Sultan Abdul Hamid II was too paranoid to mobilise his own army, fearing this would result in a coup d'état), effectively gaining control in both territories. Abdul Hamid II was so fearful of a coup that he did not allow his army to conduct war games, lest this serve as cover for a coup, but he did see the need for military mobilisation. In 1883, a German military mission under General Baron Colmar von der Goltz arrived to train the Ottoman Army, leading to the so-called "Goltz generation" of German-trained officers, who played a notable role in the politics of the empire's last years.

From 1894 to 1896, between 100,000 and 300,000 Armenians living throughout the empire were killed in what became known as the Hamidian massacres.

In 1897 the population was 19 million, of whom 14 million (74%) were Muslim. An additional 20 million lived in provinces that remained under the sultan's nominal suzerainty but were entirely outside his actual power. One by one the Porte lost nominal authority. They included Egypt, Tunisia, Bulgaria, Cyprus, Bosnia-Herzegovina, and Lebanon.

As the Ottoman Empire gradually shrank, 7–9 million Muslims from its former territories in the Caucasus, Crimea, Balkans, and the Mediterranean islands migrated to Anatolia and Eastern Thrace. After the Empire lost the First Balkan War (1912–1913), it lost all its Balkan territories except East Thrace (European Turkey). This resulted in around 400,000 Muslims fleeing with the retreating Ottoman armies (with many dying from cholera brought by the soldiers), and 400,000 non-Muslims fled territory still under Ottoman rule. Justin McCarthy estimates that from 1821 to 1922, 5.5 million Muslims died in southeastern Europe, with the expulsion of 5 million. In addition the Ottoman state encouraged transnational migration, including Circassians, Bosnians, and Russian Jews resettled in the southern Levant. These communities, alongside internal Arab resettlement, reshaped rural society and land use in ways that reflected broader imperial patterns of demographic engineering and agrarian expansion.

=== Defeat and dissolution (1908–1922) ===
==== Young Turk movement ====
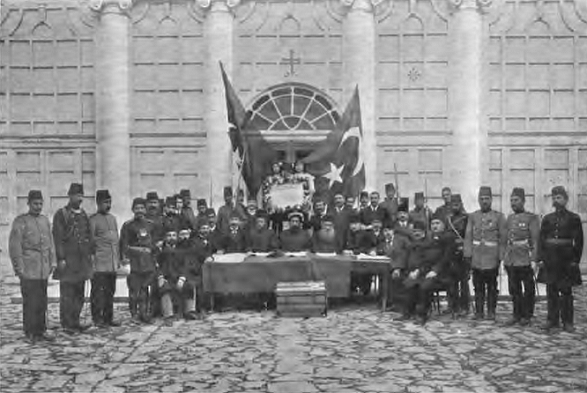
Declaration of the Young Turk Revolution by the leaders of the Ottoman millets in 1908

The defeat and dissolution of the Ottoman Empire (1908–1922) began with the Second Constitutional Era, a moment of hope and promise established with the Young Turk Revolution. It restored the Constitution of the Ottoman Empire and brought in multi-party politics with a two-stage electoral system (electoral law) under the Ottoman parliament. The constitution offered hope by freeing the empire's citizens to modernise the state's institutions, rejuvenate its strength, and enable it to hold its own against outside powers. Its guarantee of liberties promised to dissolve inter-communal tensions and transform the empire into a more harmonious place. Instead, this period became the story of the twilight struggle of the Empire.

Members of Young Turks movement who had once gone underground now established their parties. Among them the Committee of Union and Progress and the Freedom and Accord Party were major parties. On the other end of the spectrum were ethnic parties, which included Poale Zion, Al-Fatat, and Armenian national movement organised under Armenian Revolutionary Federation. Profiting from the civil strife, Austria-Hungary officially annexed Bosnia and Herzegovina in 1908. The last of the Ottoman censuses was performed in 1914. Despite military reforms which reconstituted the Ottoman Modern Army, the Empire lost its North African territories and the Dodecanese in the Italo-Turkish War (1911) and almost all of its European territories in the Balkan Wars (1912–1913). The Empire faced continuous unrest in the years leading up to World War I, including the 31 March Incident and two further coups in 1912 and 1913.

==== World War I ====
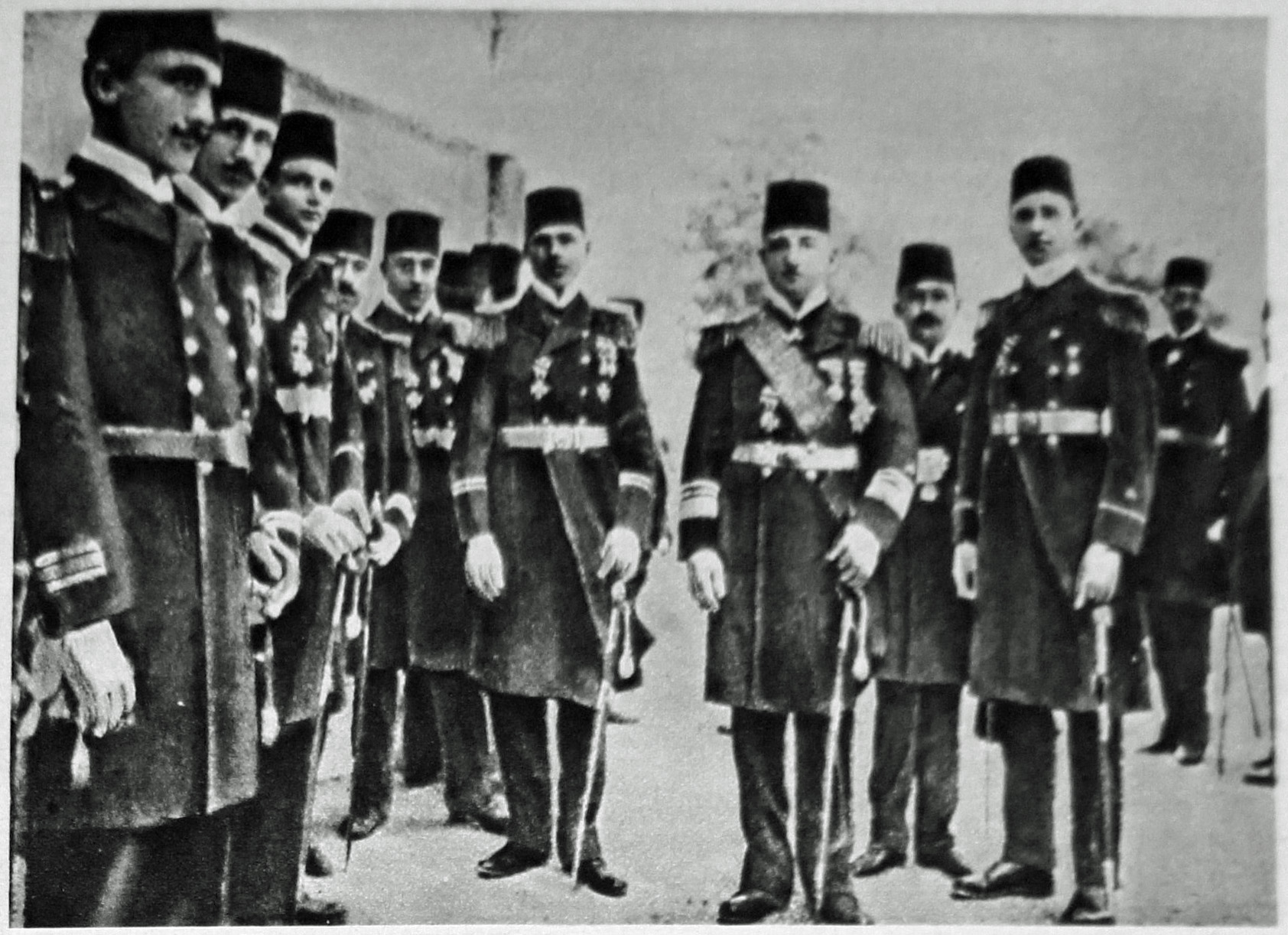
Admiral Wilhelm Souchon, who commanded the Black Sea raid on 29 October 1914, and his officers in Ottoman naval uniforms

The Ottoman Empire entered World War I on the side of the Central Powers and was ultimately defeated. The Ottoman participation in the war began with the combined German-Ottoman surprise attack on the Black Sea coast of the Russian Empire on 29 October 1914. Following the attack, the Russian Empire (2 November 1914) and its allies France (5 November 1914) and the British Empire (5 November 1914) declared war on the Ottoman Empire. Also on 5 November 1914, the British government changed the status of the Khedivate of Egypt and Cyprus, which were de jure Ottoman territories prior to the war, to British protectorates.

The Ottomans successfully defended the Dardanelles strait during the Gallipoli campaign (1915–1916) and achieved initial victories against British forces in the first two years of the Mesopotamian campaign, such as the Siege of Kut (1915–1916); but the Arab Revolt (1916–1918) turned the tide against the Ottomans in the Middle East. In the Caucasus campaign, however, the Russian forces had the upper hand from the beginning, especially after the Battle of Sarikamish (1914–1915). Russian forces advanced into northeastern Anatolia and controlled the major cities there until retreating from World War I with the Treaty of Brest-Litovsk following the Russian Revolution in 1917.

==== Genocides ====
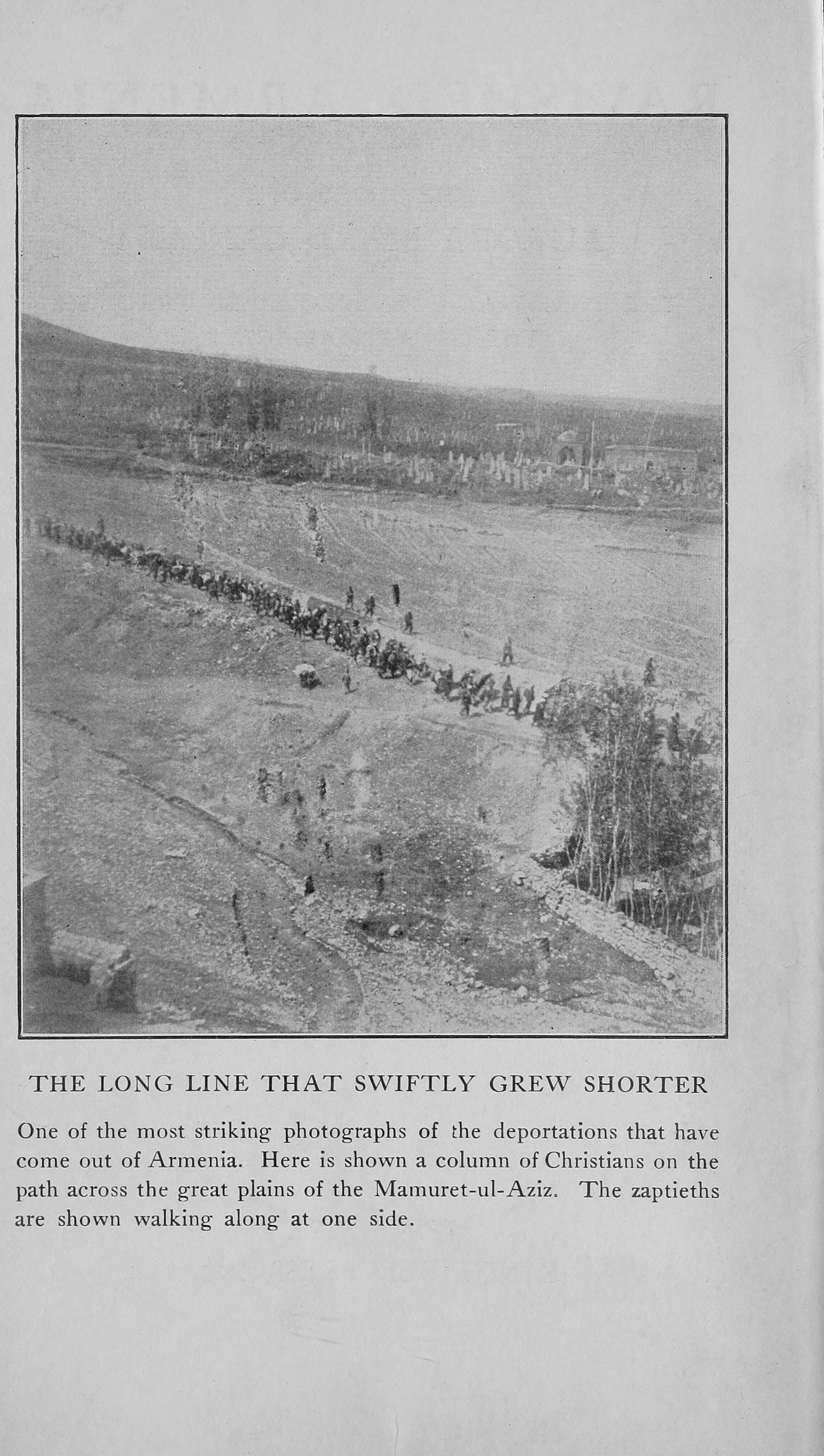
The Armenian genocide was the result of the Ottoman government's deportation and ethnic cleansing policies regarding its Armenian citizens after the Battle of Sarikamish (1914–1915) and the collapse of the Caucasus Front against the Imperial Russian Army and Armenian volunteer units during World War I. An estimated 600,000 to more than 1 million, or up to 1.5 million people were killed.

In 1915 the Ottoman government and Kurdish tribes in the region started the extermination of its ethnic Armenian population, resulting in the deaths of up to 1.5 million Armenians in the Armenian genocide. The genocide was carried out during and after World War I and implemented in two phases: the wholesale killing of the able-bodied male population through massacre and subjection of army conscripts to forced labour, followed by the deportation of women, children, the elderly and infirm on death marches leading to the Syrian desert. Driven forward by military escorts, the deportees were deprived of food and water and subjected to periodic robbery, rape, and systematic massacre. Large-scale massacres were also committed against the Empire's Greek and Assyrian minorities as part of the same campaign of ethnic cleansing.

==== Arab Revolt ====
The Arab Revolt began in 1916 with British support. It turned the tide against the Ottomans on the Middle Eastern front, where they seemed to have the upper hand during the first two years of the war. On the basis of the McMahon–Hussein Correspondence, an agreement between the British government and Hussein bin Ali, Sharif of Mecca, the revolt was officially initiated at Mecca on 10 June 1916. (Note: Though the revolt was officially initiated on 10 June, bin Ali's sons 'Ali and Faisal had already initiated operations at Medina starting on 5 June.) The Arab nationalist goal was to create a single unified and independent Arab state stretching from Aleppo, Syria, to Aden, Yemen, which the British promised to recognise.

The Sharifian Army, led by Hussein and the Hashemites, with military backing from the British Egyptian Expeditionary Force, successfully fought and expelled the Ottoman military presence from much of the Hejaz and Transjordan. The rebellion eventually took Damascus and set up a short-lived monarchy led by Faisal, a son of Hussein.

Following the terms of the 1916 Sykes–Picot Agreement, the British and French later partitioned the Middle East into mandate territories. There was no unified Arab state, much to Arab nationalists' anger. Palestine, Iraq, Lebanon and Syria became British and French mandates.

==== Treaty of Sèvres and Turkish War of Independence ====
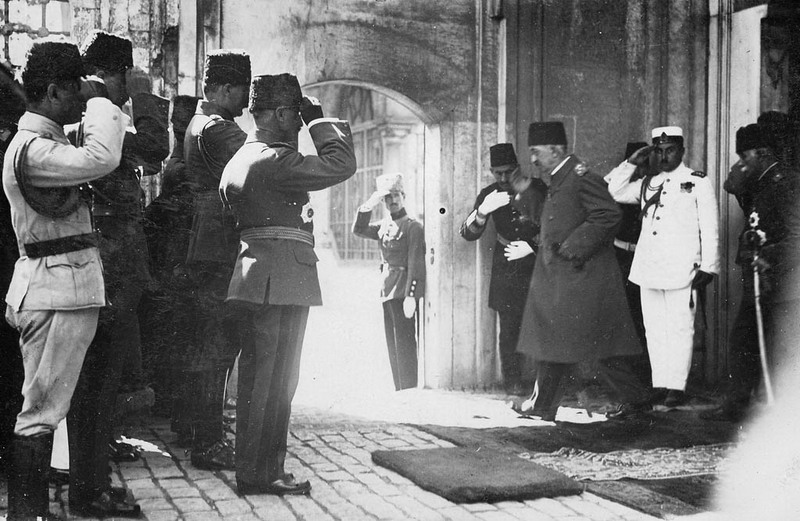
Mehmed VI, the last Sultan of the Ottoman Empire, leaving the country after the abolition of the Ottoman sultanate, 17 November 1922

Defeated in World War I, the Ottoman Empire signed the Armistice of Mudros on 30 October 1918. Istanbul was occupied by combined British, French, Italian, and Greek forces. In May 1919, Greece also took control of the area around Smyrna (now İzmir).

The partition of the Ottoman Empire was finalised under the terms of the 1920 Treaty of Sèvres. This treaty, as designed in the Conference of London, allowed the Sultan to retain his position and title. Anatolia's status was problematic given the occupied forces.

A nationalist opposition arose in the Turkish national movement. It won the Turkish War of Independence (1919–1923) under the leadership of Mustafa Kemal (later given the surname "Atatürk"). The sultanate was abolished on 1 November 1922, and the last sultan, Mehmed VI (reigned 1918–1922), left the country on 17 November 1922. The Republic of Turkey was established in its place on 29 October 1923, in the new capital city of Ankara. The caliphate was abolished on 3 March 1924.

== Historiographical debate on the Ottoman state ==
Several historians, such as British historian Edward Gibbon and the Greek historian Dimitri Kitsikis, have argued that after the fall of Constantinople, the Ottoman state took over the machinery of the Byzantine (Roman) state and that the Ottoman Empire was in essence a continuation of the Byzantine Empire under a Turkish Muslim guise. The American historian Speros Vryonis writes that the Ottoman state centred on "a Byzantine-Balkan base with a veneer of the Turkish language and the Islamic religion". Kitsikis and the American historian Heath Lowry posit that the early Ottoman state was a predatory confederacy open to both Byzantine Christians and Turkish Muslims whose primary goal was attaining booty and slaves, rather than spreading Islam, and that Islam only later became the empire's primary characteristic. Other historians have followed the lead of the Austrian historian Paul Wittek, who emphasises the early Ottoman state's Islamic character, seeing it as a "jihad state" dedicated to expanding the Muslim world. Many historians led in 1937 by the Turkish historian Mehmet Fuat Köprülü championed the Ghaza thesis, according to which the early Ottoman state was a continuation of the way of life of the nomadic Turkic tribes who had come from East Asia to Anatolia via Central Asia and the Middle East on a much larger scale. They argued that the most important cultural influences on the Ottoman state came from Persia.

The British historian Norman Stone suggests many continuities between the Byzantine and Ottoman empires, such as that the zeugarion tax of Byzantium became the Ottoman Resm-i çift tax, that the pronoia land-holding system that linked the amount of land one owned with one's ability to raise cavalry became the Ottoman timar system, and that the Ottoman land measurement the dönüm was the same as the Byzantine stremma. Stone also argues that although Sunni Islam was the state religion, the Ottoman state supported and controlled the Eastern Orthodox Church, which in return for accepting that control became the Ottoman Empire's largest land-holder. Despite the similarities, Stone argues that a crucial difference is that the land grants under the timar system were not hereditary at first. Even after they became inheritable, land ownership in the Ottoman Empire remained highly insecure, and the sultan revoked land grants whenever he wished. Stone argued this insecurity in land tenure strongly discouraged Timariots from seeking long-term development of their land, and instead led them to adopt a strategy of short-term exploitation, which had deleterious effects on the Ottoman economy.

== Government ==
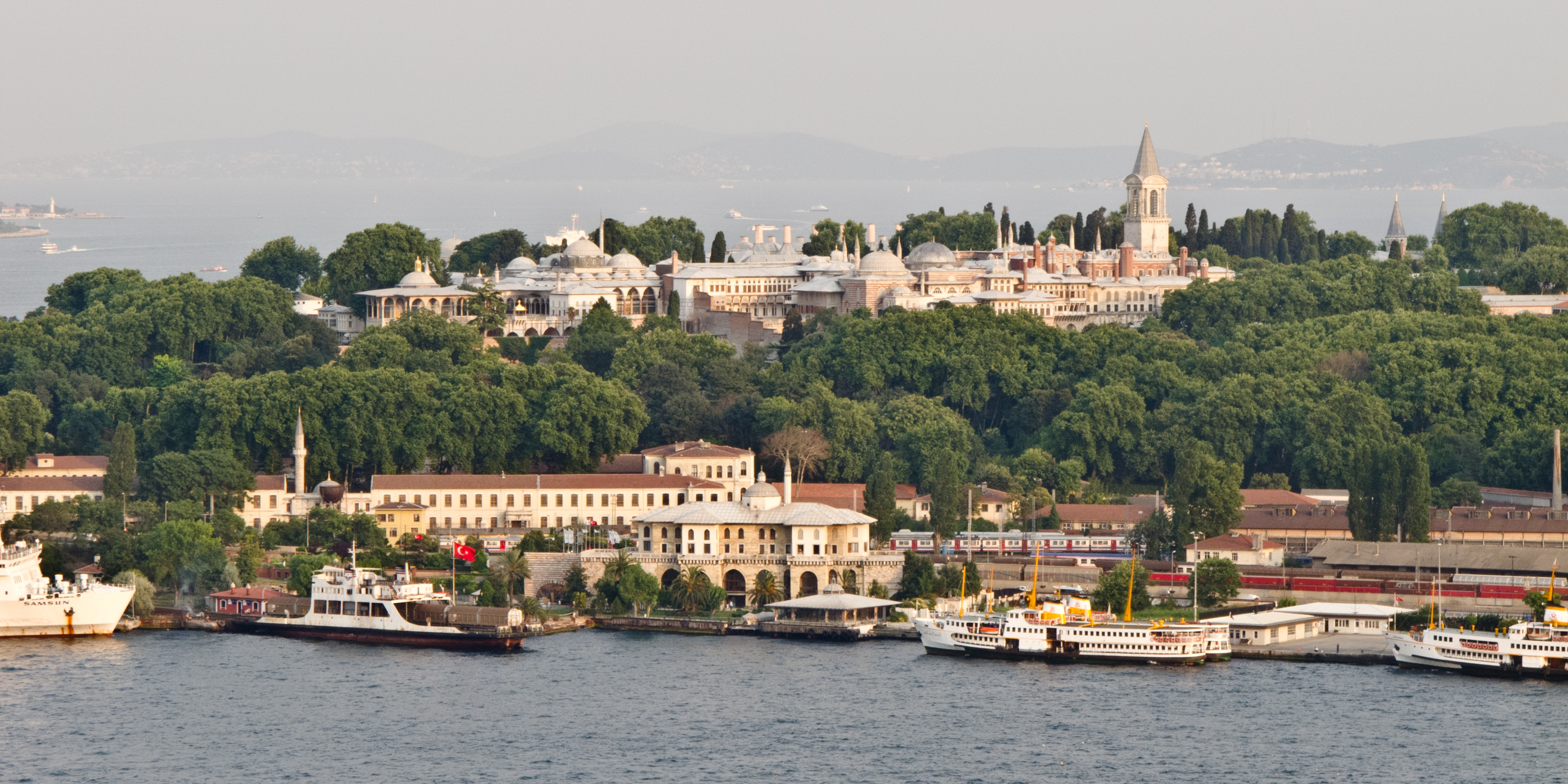

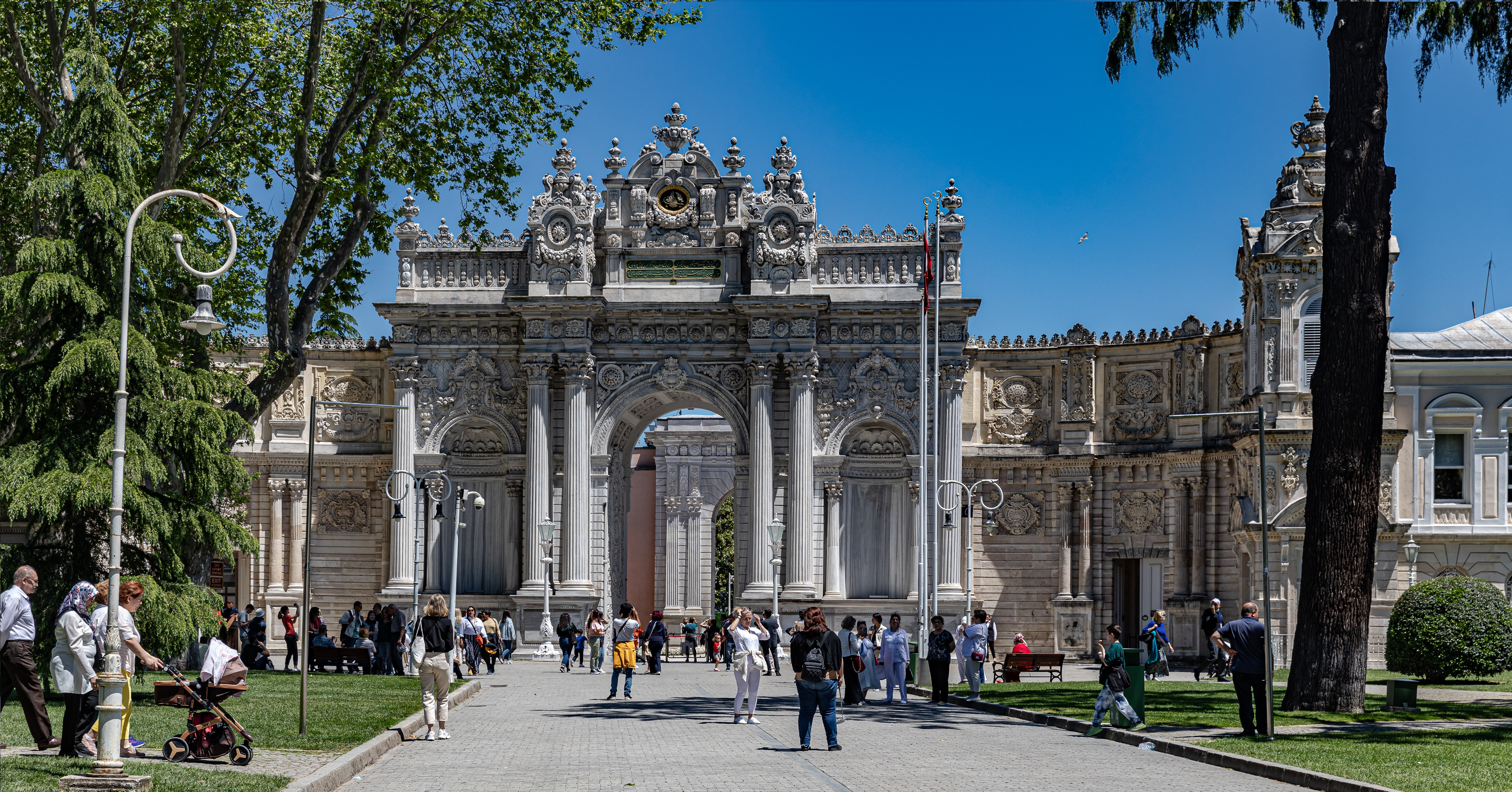
Topkapı Palace and Dolmabahçe Palace were the primary residences of the Ottoman sultans in Istanbul between 1465 and 1856 and 1856 to 1922, respectively.

Before the reforms of the 19th and 20th centuries, the state organisation of the Ottoman Empire was a system with two main dimensions, the military administration and the civil administration. The Sultan was in the highest position in the system. The civil system was based on local administrative units based on the region's characteristics. The state had control over the clergy. Certain pre-Islamic Turkish traditions that had survived the adoption of administrative and legal practices from Islamic Iran remained important in Ottoman administrative circles. According to Ottoman understanding, the state's primary responsibility was to defend and extend the land of the Muslims and to ensure security and harmony within its borders in the overarching context of orthodox Islamic practice and dynastic sovereignty.

The Ottoman Empire, or as a dynastic institution, the House of Osman, was unprecedented and unequalled in the Islamic world for its size and duration. In Europe, only the House of Habsburg had a similarly unbroken line of sovereigns (kings/emperors) from the same family who ruled for so long, and during the same period, between the late 13th and early 20th centuries. The Ottoman dynasty was Turkish in origin. On eleven occasions, the sultan was deposed (replaced by another sultan of the Ottoman dynasty, who were either the former sultan's brother, son or nephew) because he was perceived by his enemies as a threat to the state. There were only two attempts in Ottoman history to unseat the ruling Ottoman dynasty, both failures, which suggests a political system that for an extended period was able to manage its revolutions without unnecessary instability. As such, the last Ottoman sultan Mehmed VI (r. 1918–1922) was a direct patrilineal (male-line) descendant of the first Ottoman sultan Osman I (d. 1323/4), which was unparalleled in both Europe (e.g., the male line of the House of Habsburg became extinct in 1740) and in the Islamic world. The primary purpose of the Imperial Harem was to ensure the birth of male heirs to the Ottoman throne and secure the continuation of the direct patrilineal (male-line) power of the Ottoman sultans in the future generations.

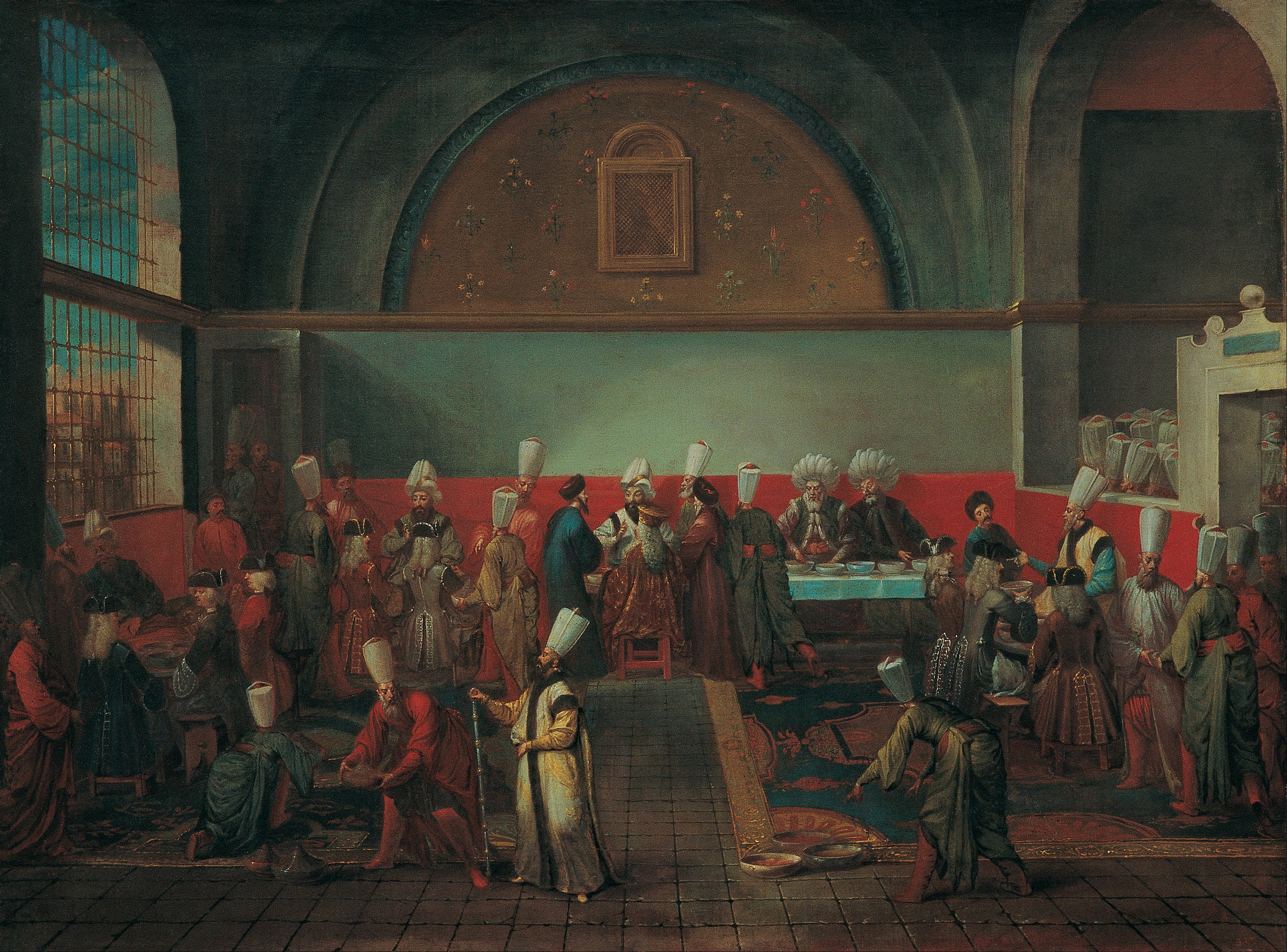
Ambassadors at the Topkapı Palace

The highest position in Islam, caliph, was claimed by the sultans starting with Selim I, which was established as the Ottoman Caliphate. The Ottoman sultan, pâdişâh or "lord of kings", served as the Empire's sole regent and was considered to be the embodiment of its government, though he did not always exercise complete control. The Imperial Harem was one of the most important powers of the Ottoman court. It was ruled by the valide sultan. On occasion, the valide sultan became involved in state politics. For a time, the women of the Harem effectively controlled the state in what was termed the "Sultanate of Women". New sultans were always chosen from the sons of the previous sultan. The strong educational system of the palace school was geared towards eliminating the unfit potential heirs and establishing support among the ruling elite for a successor. The palace schools, which also educated the future administrators of the state, were not a single track. First, the Madrasa (Medrese) was designated for the Muslims, and educated scholars and state officials according to Islamic tradition. The financial burden of the Medrese was supported by vakifs, allowing children of poor families to move to higher social levels and income. The second track was a free boarding school for the Christians, the Enderûn, which recruited 3,000 students annually from Christian boys between eight and twenty years old from one in forty families among the communities settled in Rumelia or the Balkans, a process known as Devshirme (Devşirme). The Devshirme falls within modern definitions of genocide.

Though the sultan was the supreme monarch, the sultan's political and executive authority was delegated. The politics of the state had a number of advisors and ministers gathered around a council known as Divan. The Divan, in the years when the Ottoman state was still a Beylik, was composed of the elders of the tribe. Its composition was later modified to include military officers and local elites (such as religious and political advisors). Later still, beginning in 1320, a Grand Vizier was appointed to assume certain of the sultan's responsibilities. The Grand Vizier had considerable independence from the sultan with almost unlimited powers of appointment, dismissal, and supervision. Beginning with the late 16th century, sultans withdrew from politics and the Grand Vizier became the de facto head of state.

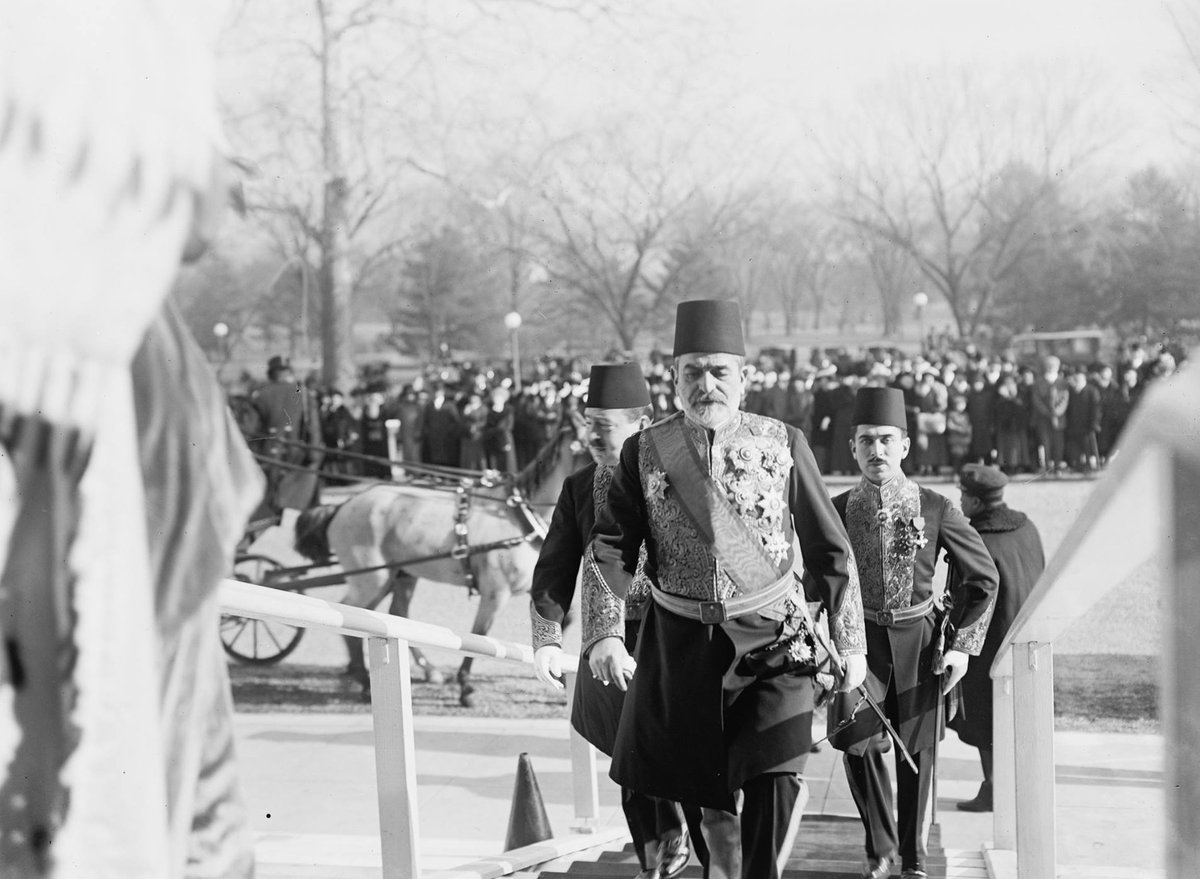
Yusuf Ziya Pasha, Ottoman ambassador to the United States, in Washington, D.C., 1913

Throughout Ottoman history, there were many instances in which local governors acted independently, and even in opposition to the ruler. After the Young Turk Revolution of 1908, the Ottoman state became a constitutional monarchy. The sultan no longer had executive powers. A parliament was formed, with representatives chosen from the provinces. The representatives formed the Imperial Government of the Ottoman Empire.

This eclectic administration was apparent even in the diplomatic correspondence of the Empire, which was initially undertaken in the Greek language to the west.

The Tughra were calligraphic monograms, or signatures, of the Ottoman Sultans, of which there were 35. Carved on the Sultan's seal, they bore the names of the Sultan and his father. The statement and prayer, "ever victorious", was also present in most. The earliest belonged to Orhan Gazi. The ornately stylised Tughra spawned a branch of Ottoman-Turkish calligraphy.

=== Law ===
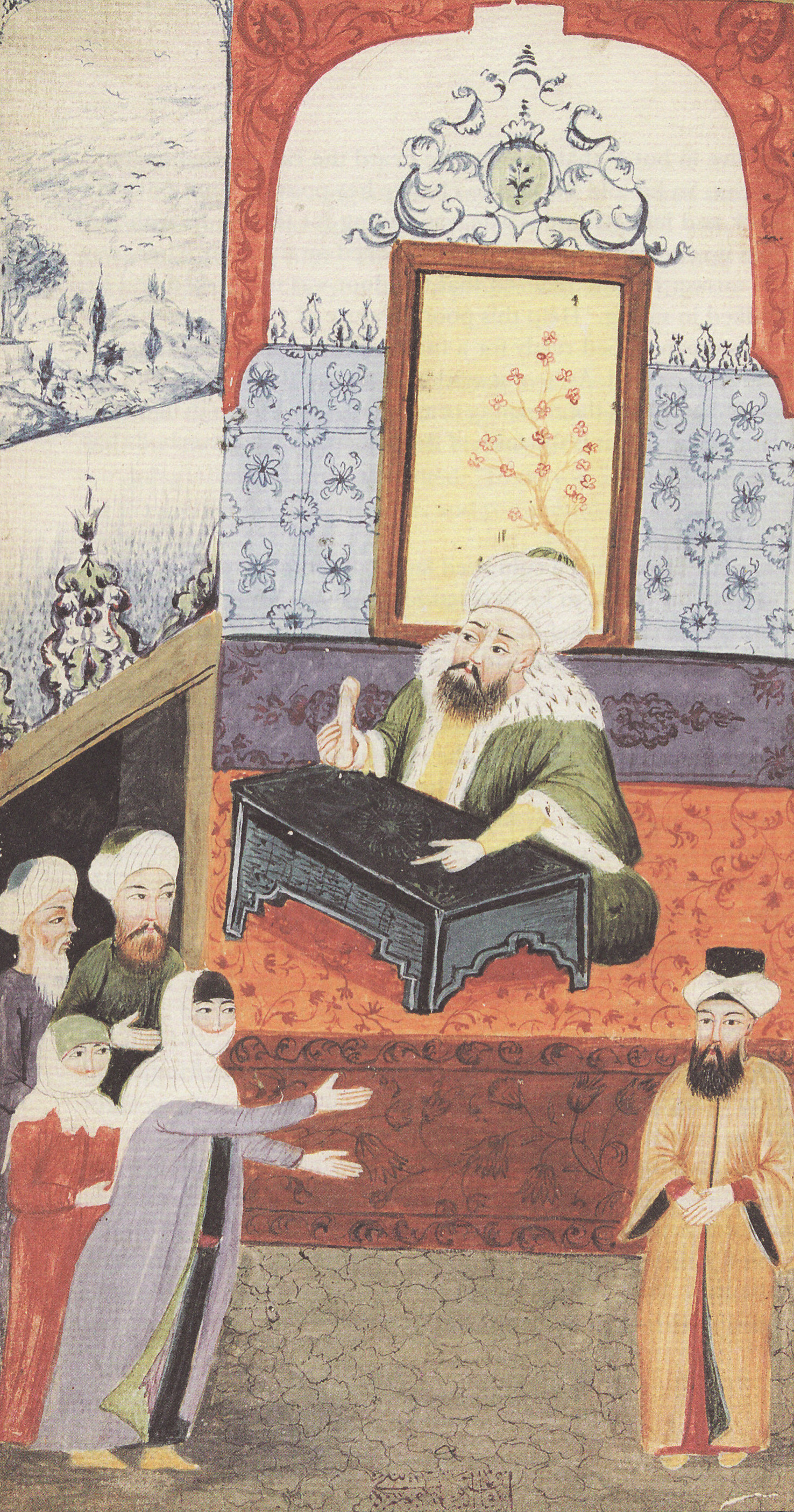
An unhappy wife complaining to the Qadi about her husband's impotence, as depicted in an Ottoman miniature. Divorce is allowed in Islamic law and can be initiated by either the husband or the wife.

The Ottoman legal system accepted the religious law over its subjects. At the same time the Qanun (or Kanun), dynastic law, co-existed with religious law or Sharia. The Ottoman Empire was always organised around a system of local jurisprudence. Legal administration in the Ottoman Empire was part of a larger scheme of balancing central and local authority. Ottoman power revolved crucially around the administration of the rights to land, which gave a space for the local authority to develop the needs of the local millet. The jurisdictional complexity of the Ottoman Empire was aimed to permit the integration of culturally and religiously different groups. The Ottoman system had three court systems: one for Muslims, one for non-Muslims, involving appointed Jews and Christians ruling over their respective religious communities, and the "trade court". The entire system was regulated from above by means of the administrative Qanun, i.e., laws, a system based upon the Turkic Yassa and Töre, which were developed in the pre-Islamic era.

These court categories were not, however, wholly exclusive; for instance, the Islamic courts, which were the Empire's primary courts, could also be used to settle a trade conflict or disputes between litigants of differing religions, and Jews and Christians often went to them to obtain a more forceful ruling on an issue. The Ottoman state tended not to interfere with non-Muslim religious law systems, despite legally having a voice to do so through local governors. The Islamic Sharia law system had been developed from a combination of the Qur'an; the Hadīth, or words of Muhammad; ijmā', or consensus of the members of the Muslim community; qiyas, a system of analogical reasoning from earlier precedents; and local customs. Both systems were taught at the Empire's law schools, which were in Istanbul and Bursa.

The Ottoman Islamic legal system was set up differently from traditional European courts. Presiding over Islamic courts was a Qadi, or judge. Since the closing of the ijtihad, or 'Gate of Interpretation', Qadis throughout the Ottoman Empire focused less on legal precedent, and more with local customs and traditions in the areas that they administered. However, the Ottoman court system lacked an appellate structure, leading to jurisdictional case strategies where plaintiffs could take their disputes from one court system to another until they achieved a ruling that was in their favour.

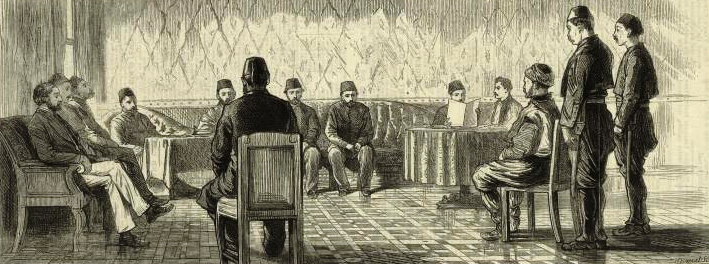
An Ottoman trial, 1877

In the late 19th century, the Ottoman legal system saw substantial reform. This process of legal modernisation began with the Edict of Gülhane of 1839. These reforms included the "fair and public trial[s] of all accused regardless of religion", the creation of a system of "separate competences, religious and civil", and the validation of testimony on non-Muslims. Specific land codes (1858), civil codes (1869–1876), and a code of civil procedure also were enacted.

These reforms were based heavily on French models, as indicated by the adoption of a three-tiered court system. Referred to as Nizamiye, this system was extended to the local magistrate level with the final promulgation of the Mecelle, a civil code that regulated marriage, divorce, alimony, will, and other matters of personal status. In an attempt to clarify the division of judicial competences, an administrative council laid down that religious matters were to be handled by religious courts, and statute matters were to be handled by the Nizamiye courts.

=== Military ===
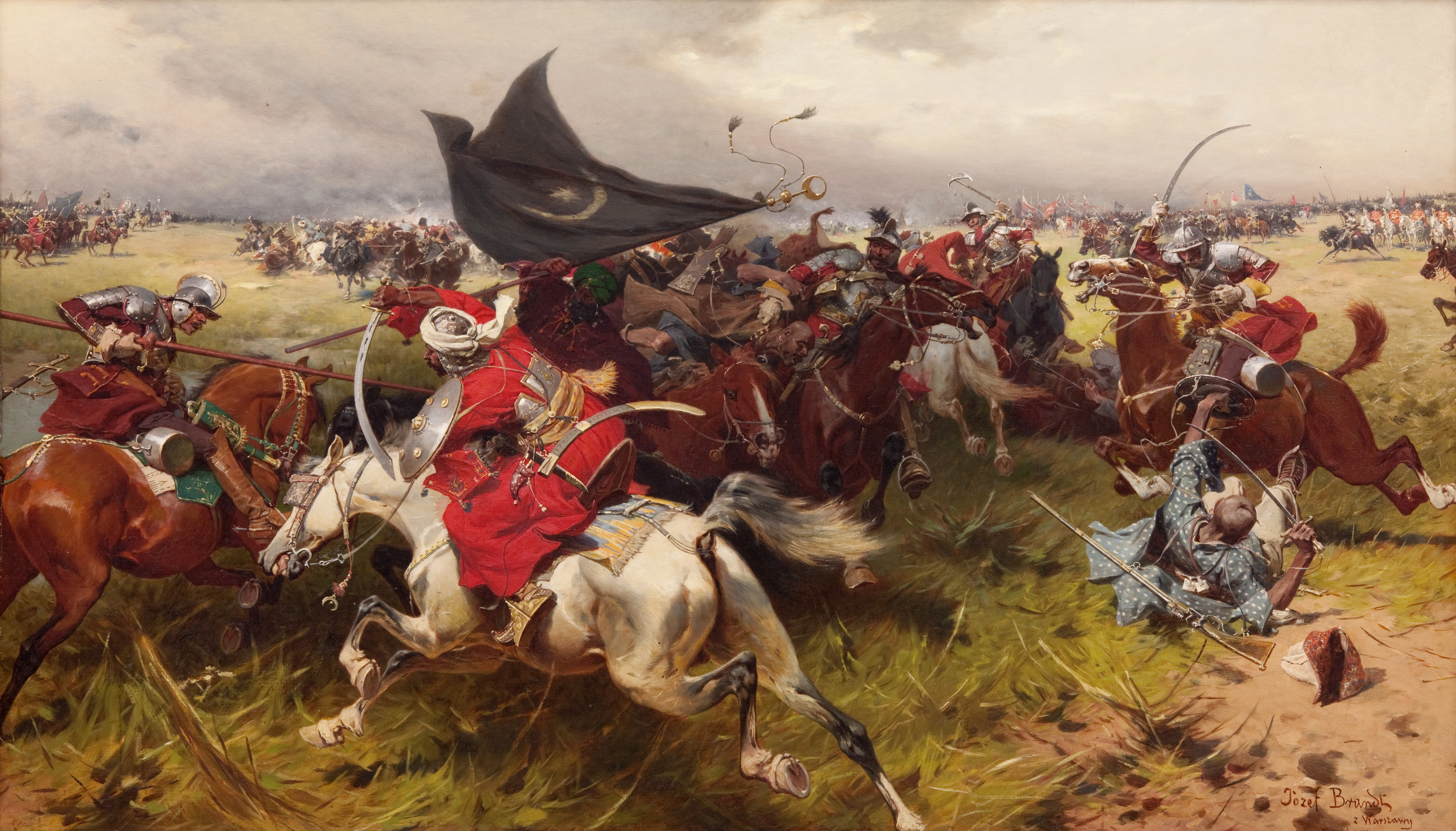
Ottoman sipahis in battle, holding the crescent banner, by Józef Brandt

The first military unit of the Ottoman State was an army that was organised by Osman I from the tribesmen inhabiting the hills of western Anatolia in the late 13th century. The military system became an intricate organisation with the advance of the Empire. The Ottoman military was a complex system of recruiting and fief-holding. The main corps of the Ottoman Army included Janissary, Sipahi, Akıncı and Mehterân. The Ottoman army was once among the most advanced fighting forces in the world, being one of the first to use muskets and cannons. The Ottoman Turks began using falconets, which were short but wide cannons, during the Siege of Constantinople. The Ottoman cavalry depended on high speed and mobility rather than heavy armour, using bows and short swords on fast Turkoman and Arabian horses (progenitors of the Thoroughbred racing horse), and often applied tactics similar to those of the Mongol Empire, such as pretending to retreat while surrounding the enemy forces inside a crescent-shaped formation and then making the real attack. The Ottoman army continued to be an effective fighting force throughout the seventeenth and early eighteenth centuries, falling behind the empire's European rivals only during a long period of peace from 1740 to 1768.

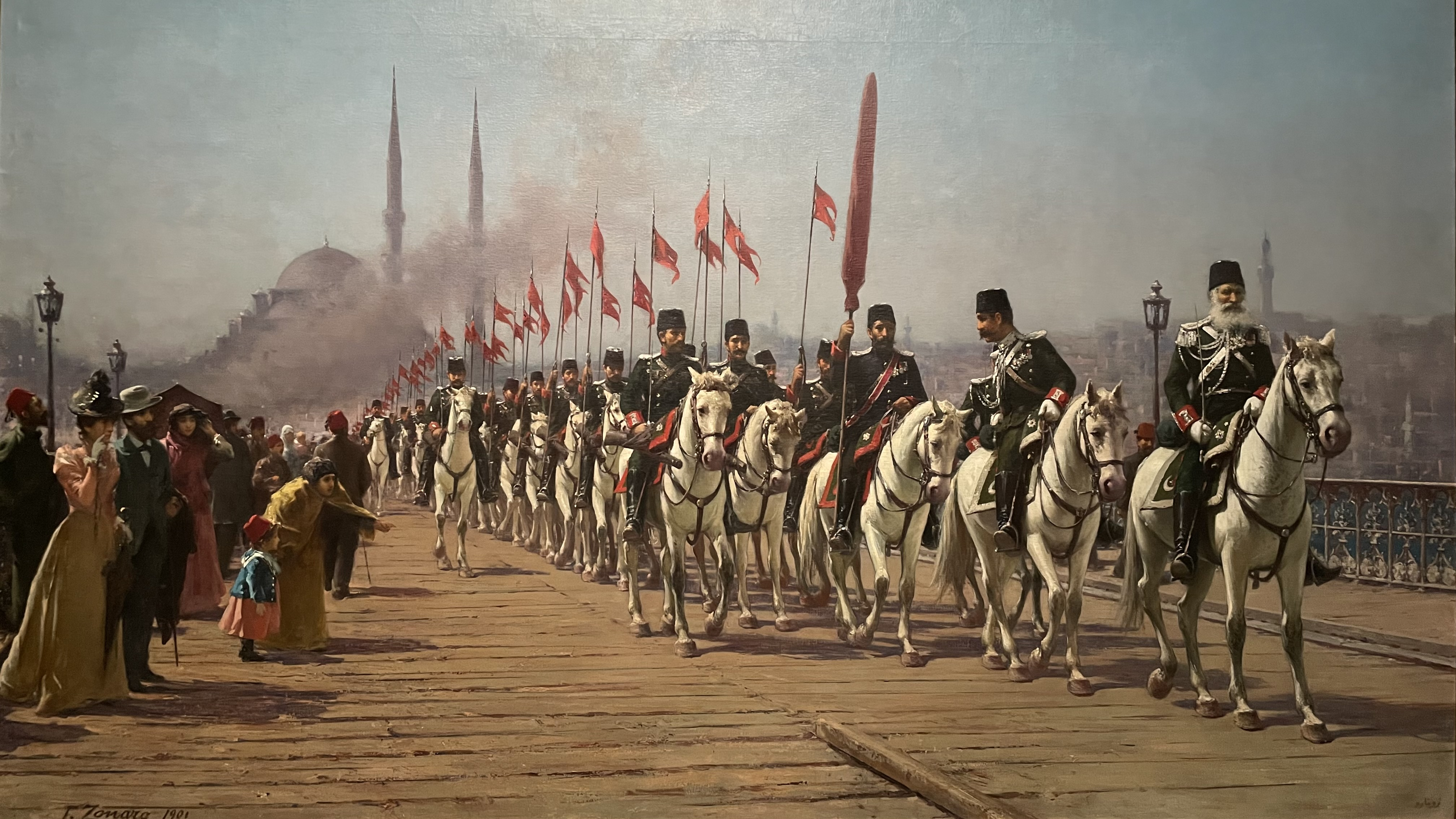
Modernised Ertugrul Cavalry Regiment crossing the Galata Bridge in 1901

The modernisation of the Ottoman Empire in the 19th century started with the military. In 1826 Sultan Mahmud II abolished the Janissary corps and established the modern Ottoman army. He named them as the Nizam-ı Cedid (New Order). The Ottoman army was also the first institution to hire foreign experts and send its officers for training in western European countries. Consequently, the Young Turks movement began when these relatively young and newly trained men returned with their education.

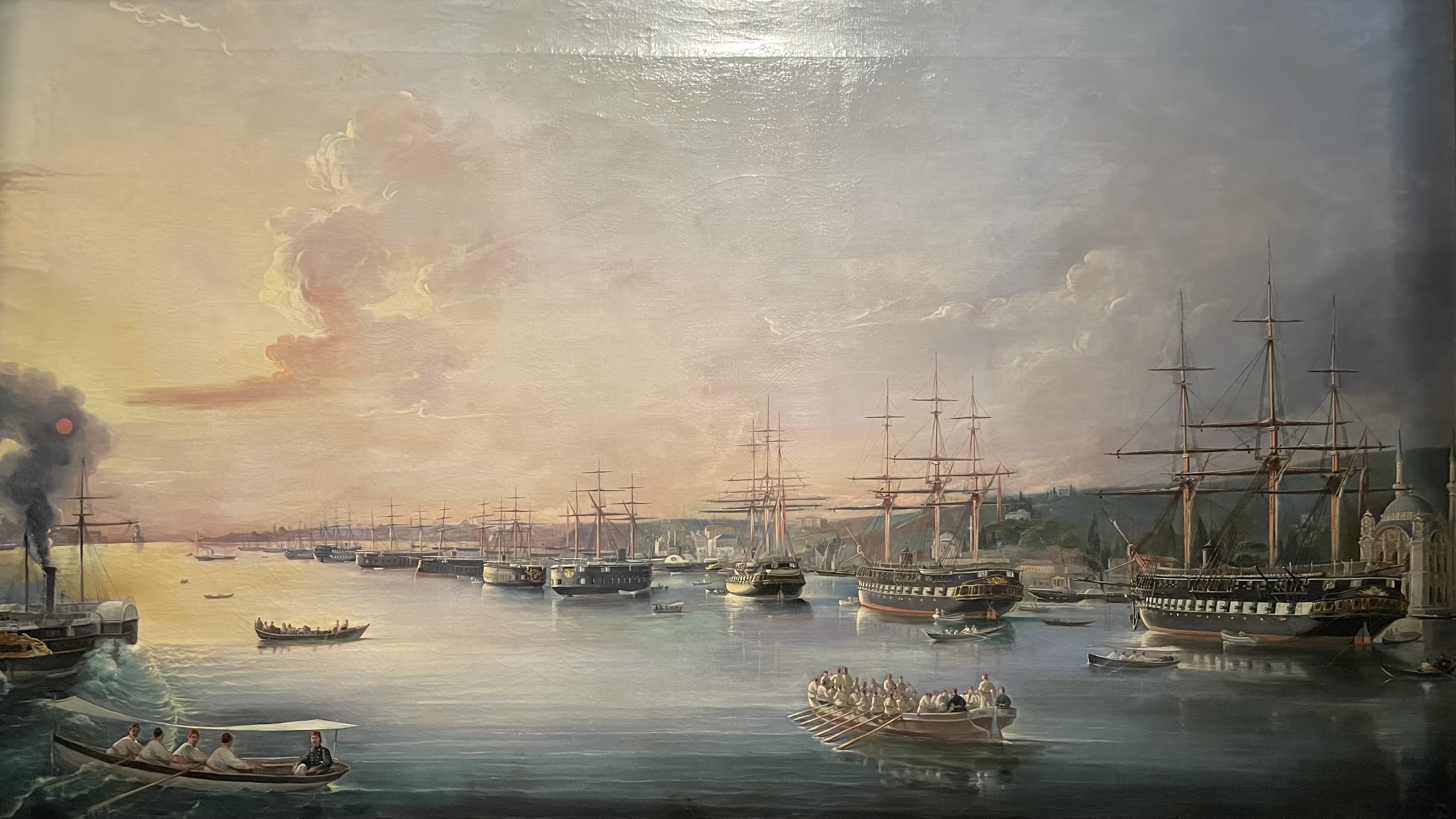
The Ottoman fleet in the Bosphorous near Ortaköy

The Ottoman Navy vastly contributed to the expansion of the Empire's territories on the European continent. It initiated the conquest of North Africa, with the addition of Algeria and Egypt to the Ottoman Empire in 1517. Starting with the loss of Greece in 1821 and Algeria in 1830, Ottoman naval power and control over the Empire's distant overseas territories began to decline. Sultan Abdülaziz (reigned 1861–1876) attempted to reestablish a strong Ottoman navy, building the largest fleet after those of Britain and France. The shipyard at Barrow, England, built its first submarine in 1886 for the Ottoman Empire.

However, the collapsing Ottoman economy could not sustain the fleet's strength for long. Sultan Abdülhamid II distrusted the admirals who sided with the reformist Midhat Pasha and claimed that the large and expensive fleet was of no use against the Russians during the Russo-Turkish War. He locked most of the fleet inside the Golden Horn, where the ships decayed for the next 30 years. Following the Young Turk Revolution in 1908, the Committee of Union and Progress sought to develop a strong Ottoman naval force. The Ottoman Navy Foundation was established in 1910 to buy new ships through public donations.

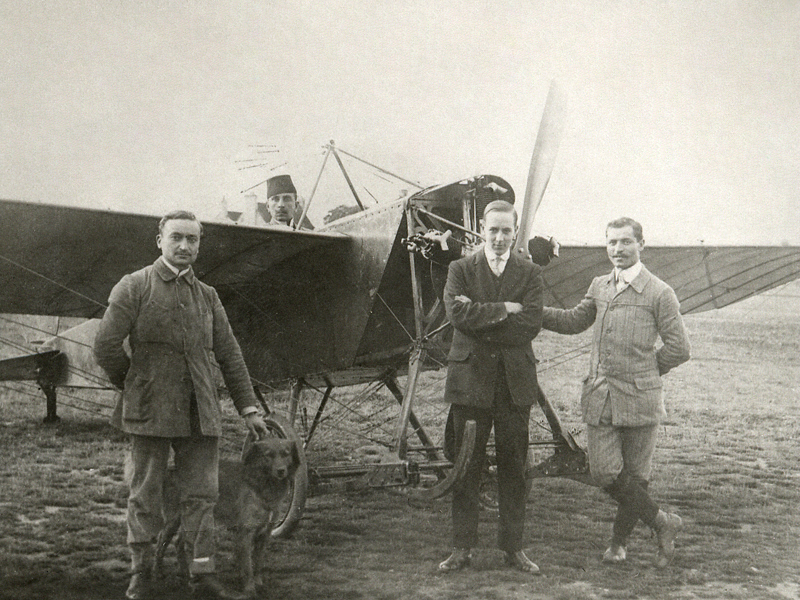
Ottoman pilots in early 1912

The establishment of Ottoman military aviation dates back to between June 1909 and July 1911. The Ottoman Empire started preparing its first pilots and planes, and with the founding of the Aviation School (Tayyare Mektebi) in Yeşilköy on 3 July 1912, the Empire began to tutor its own flight officers. The founding of the Aviation School quickened advancement in the military aviation programme, increased the number of enlisted persons within it, and gave the new pilots an active role in the Ottoman Army and Navy. In May 1913, the world's first specialised Reconnaissance Training Program was started by the Aviation School, and the first separate reconnaissance division was established. In June 1914 a new military academy, the Naval Aviation School (Bahriye Tayyare Mektebi) was founded. With the outbreak of World War I, the modernisation process stopped abruptly. The Ottoman Aviation Squadrons fought on many fronts during World War I, from Galicia in the west to the Caucasus in the east and Yemen in the south.

== Administrative divisions ==
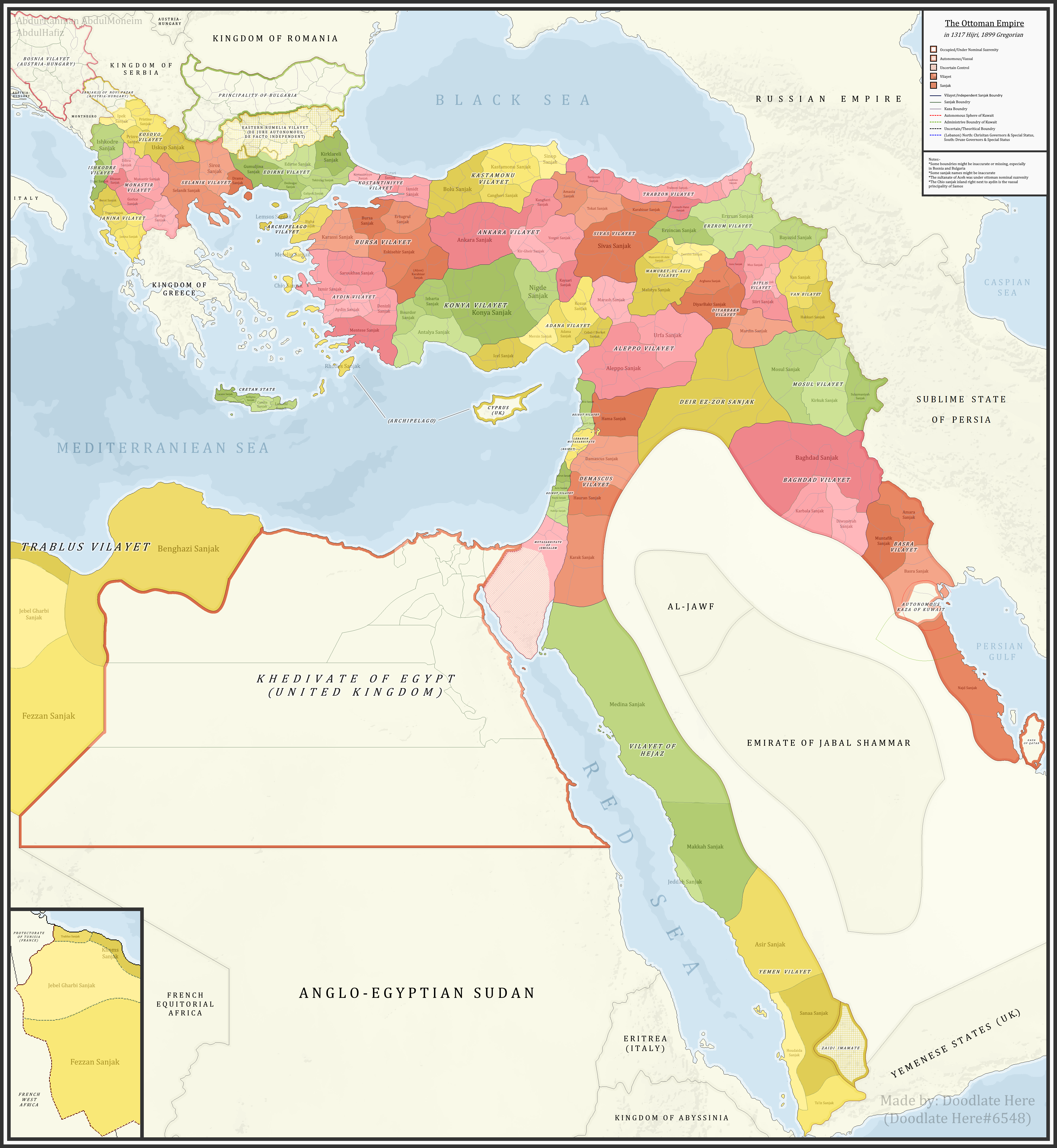
Administrative divisions of the Ottoman Empire in 1899 (year 1317 Hijri)

The Ottoman Empire was first subdivided into provinces, in the sense of fixed territorial units with governors appointed by the sultan, in the late 14th century.

The eyalet (also pashalik or beylerbeylik) was the territory of office of a beylerbey ("lord of lords" or governor), and was further subdivided into Sanjaks.

The vilayets were introduced with the promulgation of the "Vilayet Law" (Teskil-i Vilayet Nizamnamesi) in 1864, as part of the Tanzimat reforms. Unlike the previous eyalet system, the 1864 law established a hierarchy of administrative units: the vilayet, liva/sanjak/mutasarrifate, kaza and village council, to which the 1871 Vilayet Law added the nahiye.

== Economy ==
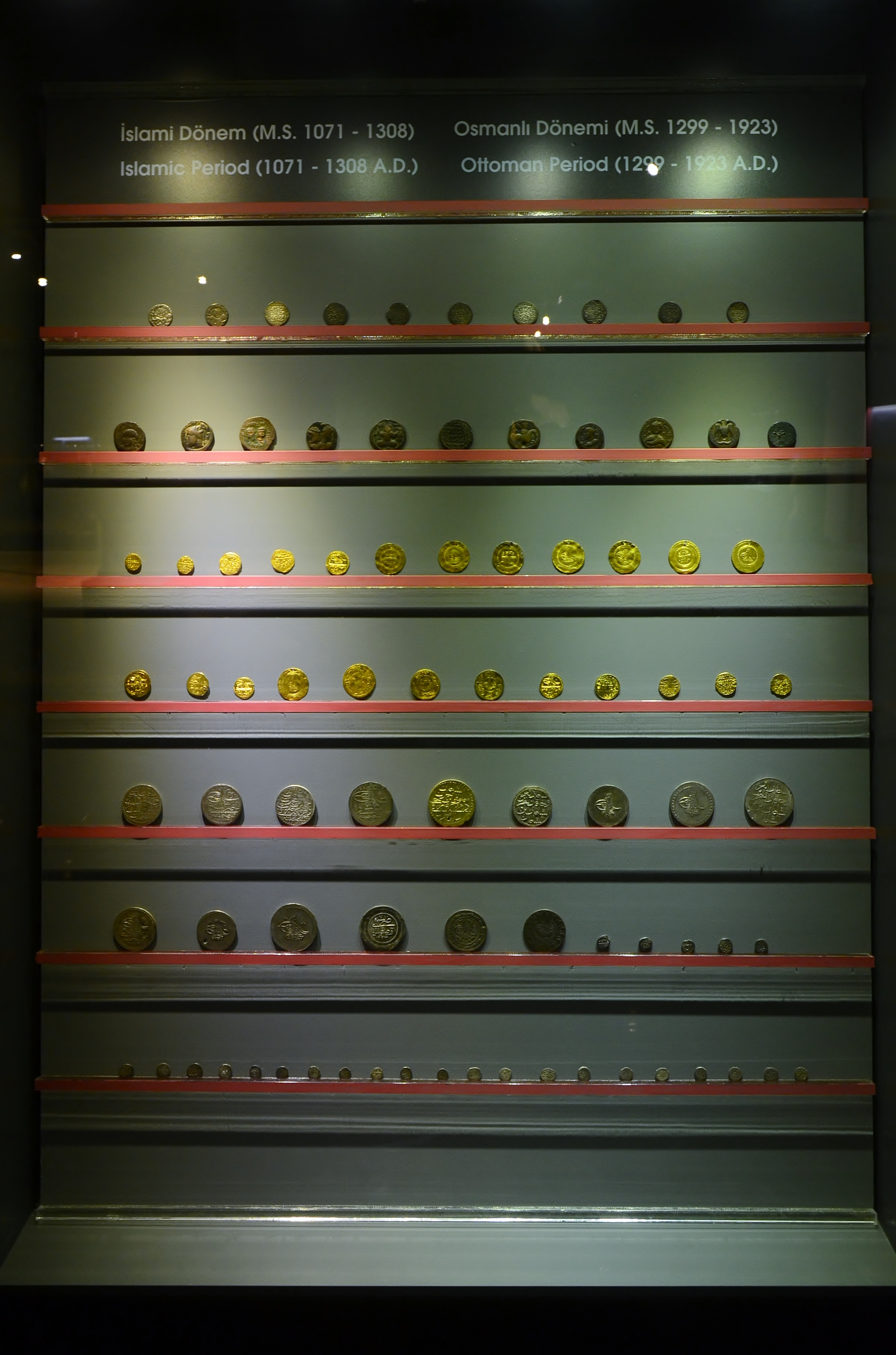
Coins of the Sultanate of Rûm and the Ottoman Empire at Aydın Archaeological Museum

The Ottoman government deliberately pursued a policy for the development of Bursa, Edirne, and Istanbul, successive Ottoman capitals, into major commercial and industrial centres, considering that merchants and artisans were indispensable in creating a new metropolis. To this end, Mehmed and his successor Bayezid, also encouraged and welcomed migration of the Jews from different parts of Europe, who were settled in Istanbul and other port cities like Salonica. In many places in Europe, Jews were suffering persecution at the hands of their Christian counterparts, such as in Spain, after the conclusion of the Reconquista. The tolerance displayed by the Turks was welcomed by the immigrants.

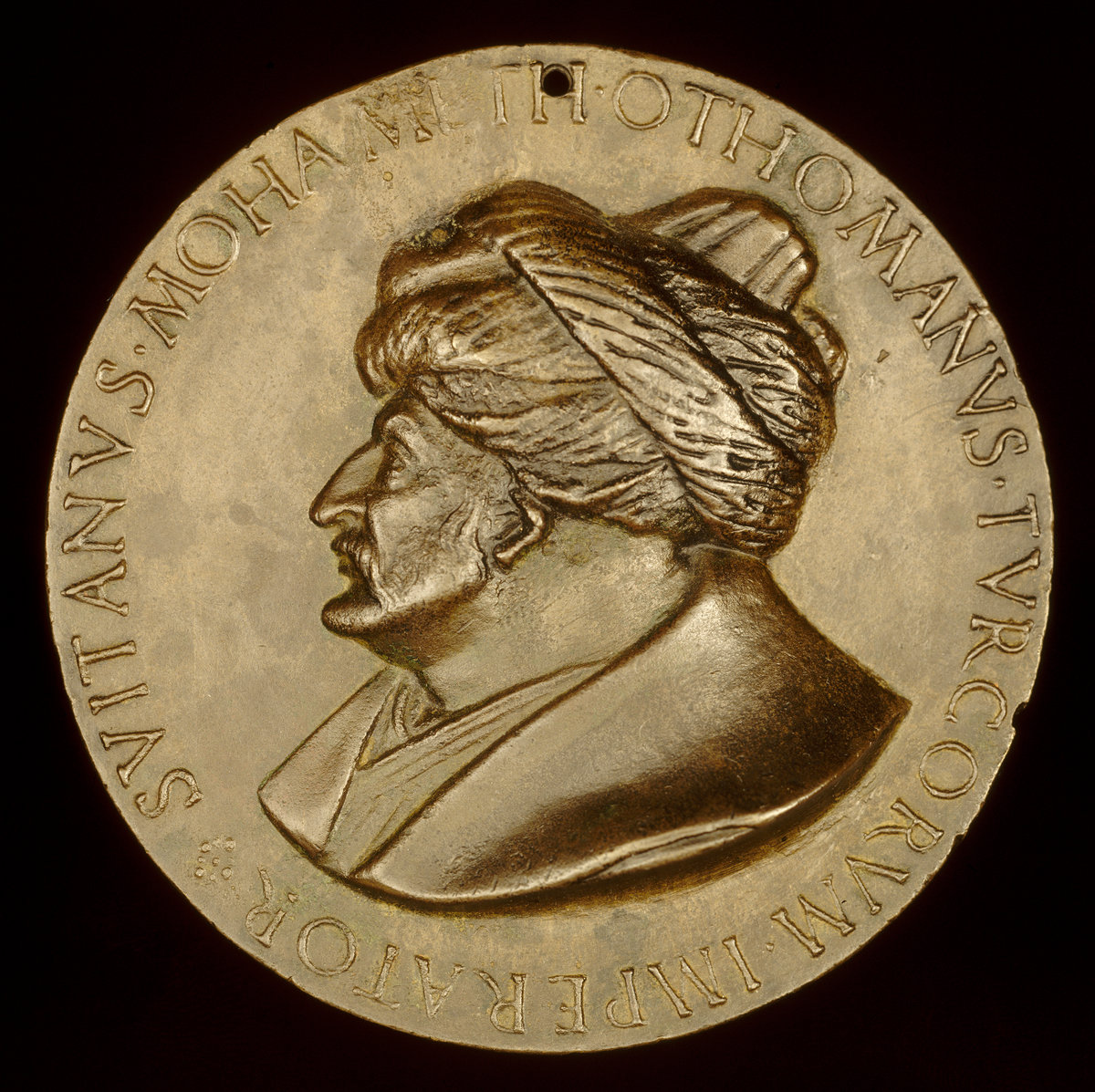
A European bronze medal from the period of Sultan Mehmed the Conqueror, 1481

The Ottoman economic mind was closely related to the basic concepts of state and society in the Middle East in which the ultimate goal of a state was consolidation and extension of the ruler's power, and the way to reach it was to get rich resources of revenues by making the productive classes prosperous. The ultimate aim was to increase the state revenues without damaging the prosperity of subjects to prevent the emergence of social disorder and to keep the traditional organisation of the society intact. The Ottoman economy greatly expanded during the early modern period, with particularly high growth rates during the first half of the 18th century. The empire's annual income quadrupled between 1523 and 1748, adjusted for inflation.

The organisation of the treasury and chancery were developed under the Ottoman Empire more than any other Islamic government and, until the 17th century, they were the leading organisation among all their contemporaries. This organisation developed a scribal bureaucracy (known as "men of the pen") as a distinct group, partly highly trained ulama, which developed into a professional body. The effectiveness of this professional financial body stands behind the success of many great Ottoman statesmen.

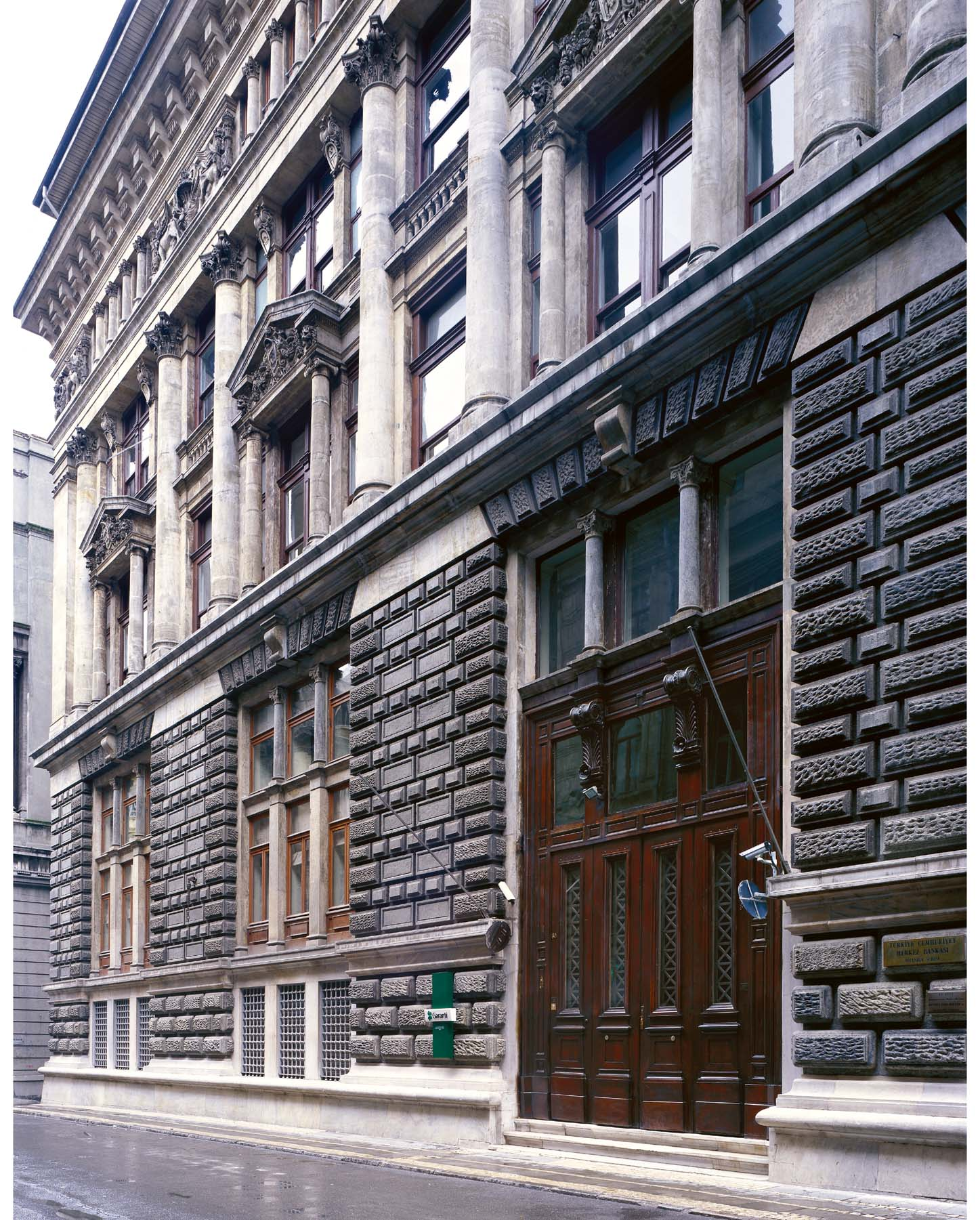
The Ottoman Bank was founded in 1856 in Constantinople. On 26 August 1896, the bank was occupied by members of the Armenian Revolutionary Federation.

Modern Ottoman studies indicate that the change in relations between the Ottoman Turks and central Europe was caused by the opening of the new sea routes. It is possible to see the decline in the significance of the land routes to the East as Western Europe opened the ocean routes that bypassed the Middle East and the Mediterranean as parallel to the decline of the Ottoman Empire itself. The Anglo-Ottoman Treaty, also known as the Treaty of Balta Liman that opened the Ottoman markets directly to English and French competitors, can be seen as one of the staging posts along with this development.

By developing commercial centres and routes, encouraging people to extend the area of cultivated land in the country and international trade through its dominions, the state performed basic economic functions in the Empire. But in all this, the financial and political interests of the state were dominant. Within the social and political system they were living in, Ottoman administrators could not see the desirability of the dynamics and principles of the capitalist and mercantile economies developing in Western Europe.

Economic historian Paul Bairoch argues that free trade contributed to deindustrialisation in the Ottoman Empire. In contrast to the protectionism of China, Japan, and Spain, the Ottoman Empire had a liberal trade policy, open to foreign imports. This has origins in capitulations of the Ottoman Empire, dating back to the first commercial treaties signed with France in 1536 and taken further with capitulations in 1673 and 1740, which lowered duties to 3% for imports and exports. The liberal Ottoman policies were praised by British economists, such as John Ramsay McCulloch in his Dictionary of Commerce (1834), but later criticised by British politicians such as Prime Minister Benjamin Disraeli, who cited the Ottoman Empire as "an instance of the injury done by unrestrained competition" in the 1846 Corn Laws debate.

== Demographics ==
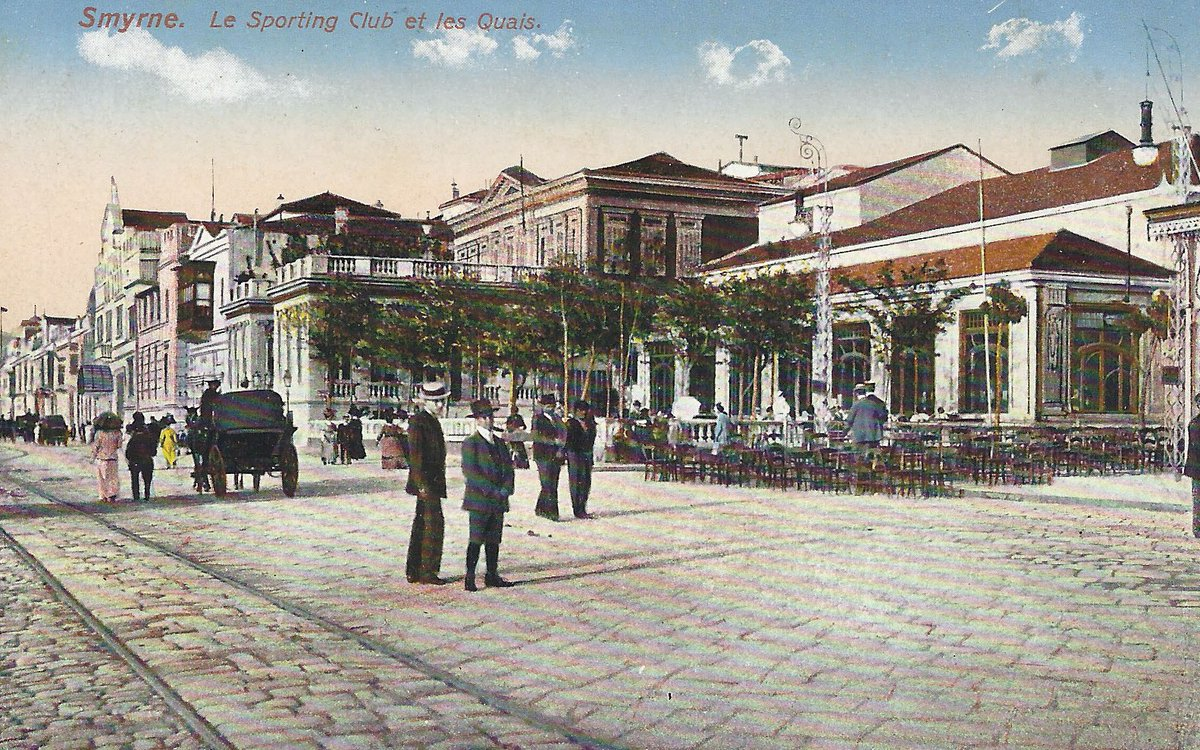
İzmir under Ottoman rule in 1900

A population estimate for the empire of 11,692,480 for the 1520–1535 period was obtained by counting the households in Ottoman tithe registers, and multiplying this number by 5. For unclear reasons, the population in the 18th century was lower than that in the 16th century. An estimate of 7,230,660 for the first census held in 1831 is considered a serious undercount, as this census was meant only to register possible conscripts.

Censuses of Ottoman territories only began in the early 19th century. Figures from 1831 onwards are available as official census results, but the censuses did not cover the whole population. For example, the 1831 census only counted men and did not cover the whole empire. For earlier periods estimates of size and distribution of the population are based on observed demographic patterns.

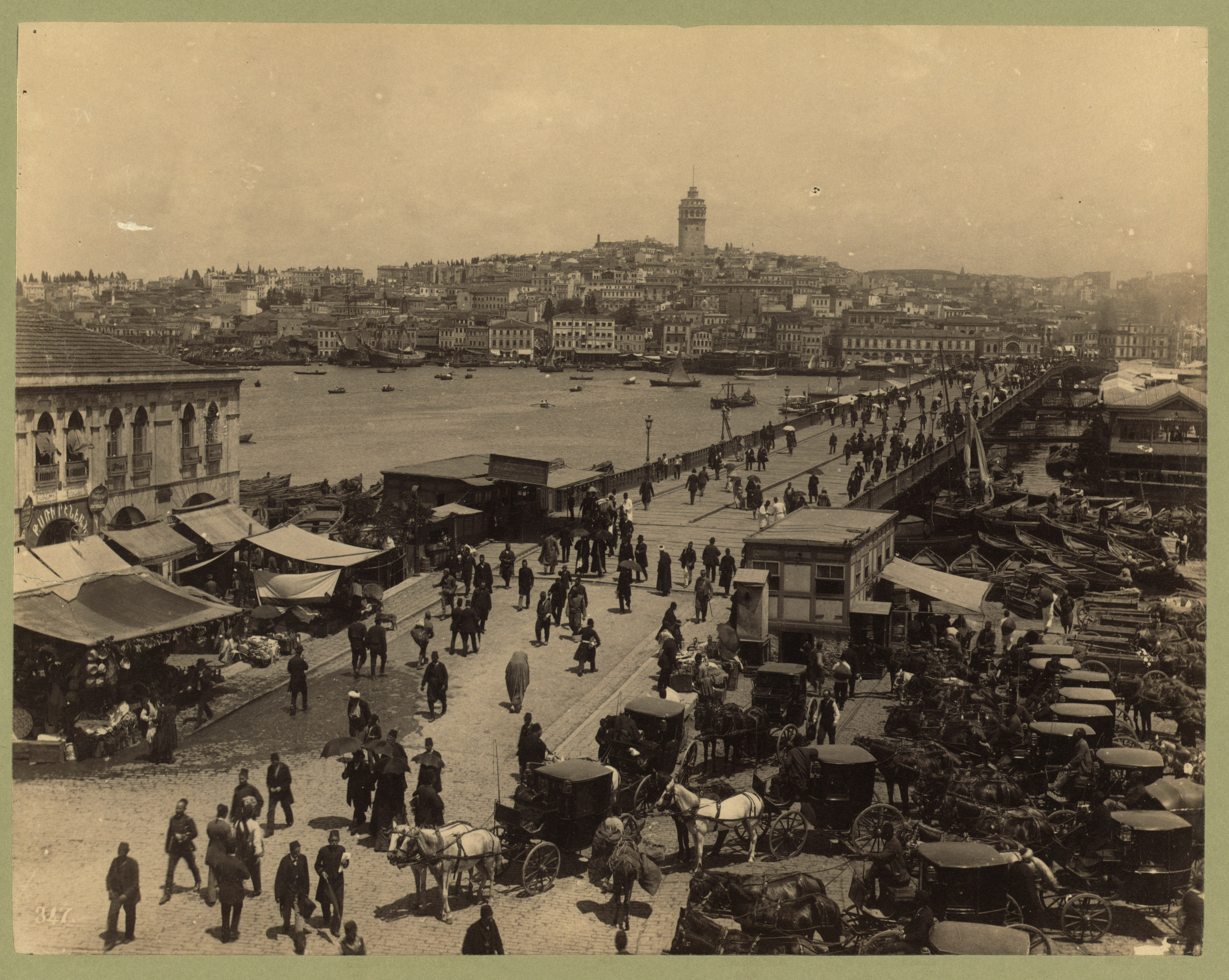
View of Galata (Karaköy) and the Galata Bridge on the Golden Horn, c. 1880–1893

However, it began to rise to reach 25–32 million by 1800, with around 10 million in the European provinces (primarily in the Balkans), 11 million in the Asiatic provinces, and around 3 million in the African provinces. Population densities were higher in the European provinces, double those in Anatolia, which in turn were triple the population densities of Iraq and Syria and five times the population density of Arabia.

Towards the end of the empire's existence life expectancy was 49 years, compared to the mid-twenties in Serbia at the beginning of the 19th century. Epidemic diseases and famine caused major disruption and demographic changes. In 1785 around one-sixth of the Egyptian population died from the plague and Aleppo saw its population reduced by twenty percent in the 18th century. Six famines hit Egypt alone between 1687 and 1731 and the last famine to hit Anatolia was four decades later. The 1812–1819 Ottoman plague epidemic would cost the lives of at least 300,000 individuals.

The rise of port cities saw the clustering of populations caused by the development of steamships and railroads. Urbanisation increased from 1700 to 1922, with towns and cities growing. Improvements in health and sanitation made them more attractive to live and work in. Port cities like Salonica, in Greece, saw its population rise from 55,000 in 1800 to 160,000 in 1912 and İzmir which had a population of 150,000 in 1800 grew to 300,000 by 1914. Some regions conversely had population falls—Belgrade saw its population drop from 25,000 to 8,000 mainly due to political strife.

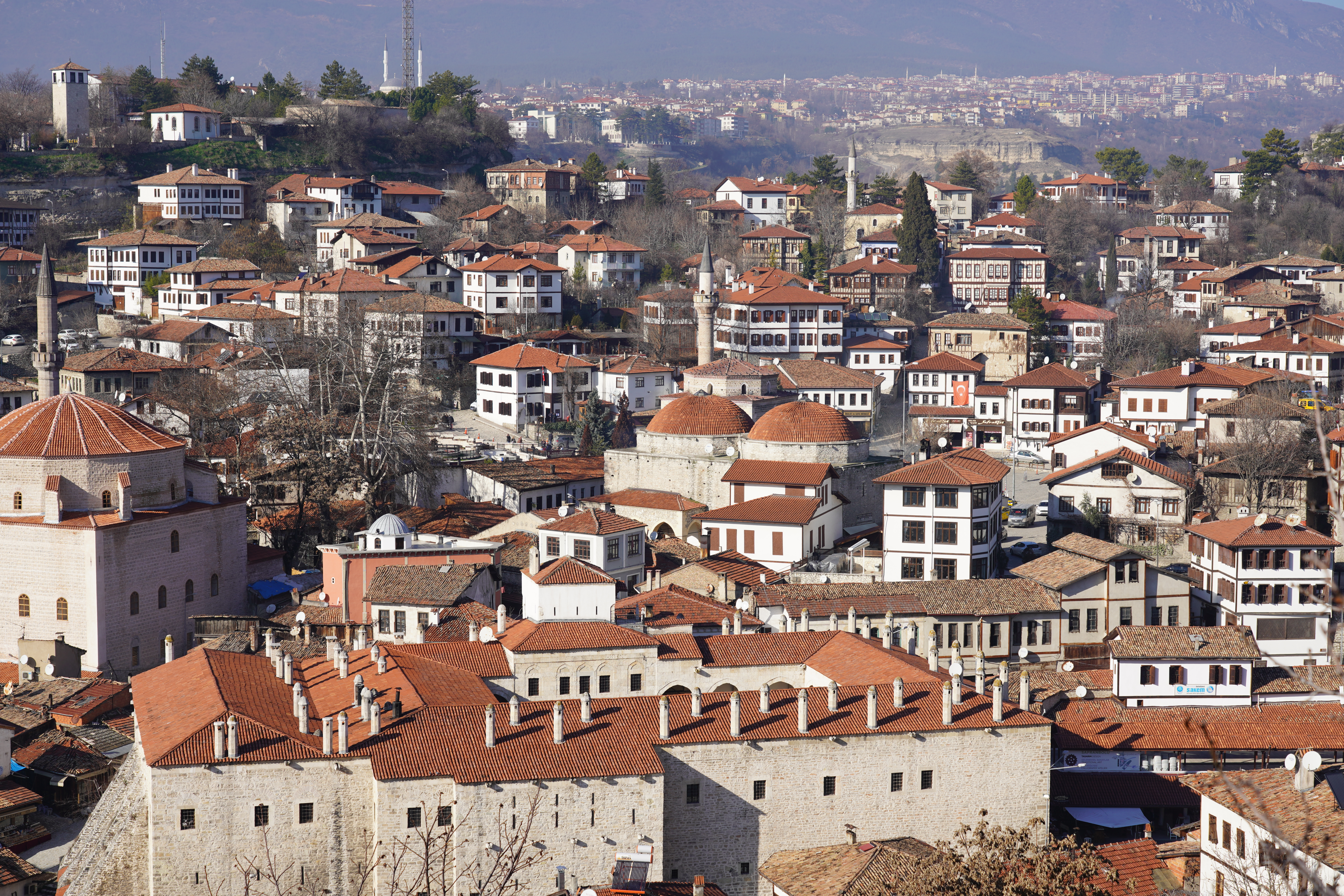
The town of Safranbolu is one of the best-preserved Ottoman villages.

Economic and political migrations made an impact across the empire. For example, the Russian and Austria-Habsburg annexation of the Crimean and Balkan regions respectively saw large influxes of Muslim refugees—200,000 Crimean Tatars fleeing to Dobruja. Between 1783 and 1913, approximately 5–7 million refugees arrived into the Ottoman Empire. Between the 1850s and World War I, about a million North Caucasian Muslims arrived in the Ottoman Empire as refugees. Some migrations left indelible marks such as political tension between parts of the empire (e.g., Turkey and Bulgaria), whereas centrifugal effects were noticed in other territories, simpler demographics emerging from diverse populations. Economies were also impacted by the loss of artisans, merchants, manufacturers, and agriculturists. Since the 19th century, a large proportion of Muslim peoples from the Balkans emigrated to present-day Turkey. These people are called Muhacir. By the time the Ottoman Empire came to an end in 1922, half of the urban population of Turkey was descended from Muslim refugees from Russia.

=== Language ===
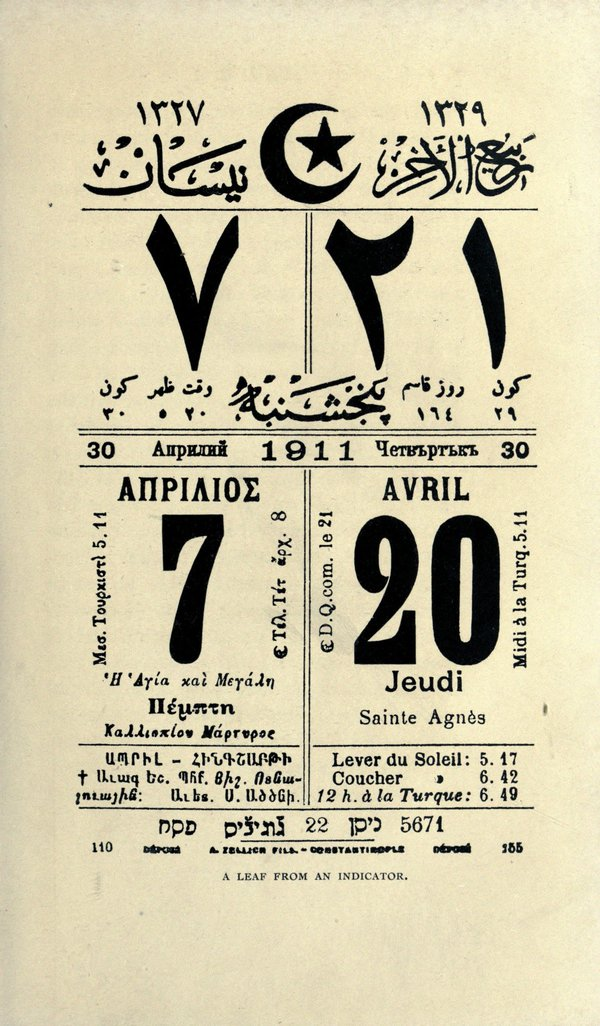
1911 Ottoman calendar shown in several different languages such as: Ottoman Turkish, Greek, Armenian, Hebrew, Bulgarian and French

Ottoman Turkish was the official language of the Empire. It was an Oghuz Turkic language highly influenced by Persian and Arabic, though lower registries spoken by the common people had fewer influences from other languages compared to higher varieties used by upper classes and governmental authorities. Turkish, in its Ottoman variation, was a language of military and administration since the nascent days of the Ottomans. The Ottoman constitution of 1876 did officially cement the official imperial status of Turkish.

The Ottomans had several influential languages: Turkish, spoken by the majority of the people in Anatolia and by the majority of Muslims of the Balkans except some regions such as Albania, Bosnia and the Megleno-Romanian-inhabited Nânti; Persian, only spoken by the educated; Arabic, spoken mainly in Egypt, the Levant, Arabia, Iraq, North Africa, Kuwait and parts of the Horn of Africa and Berber in North Africa. In the last two centuries, usage of these became limited, though, and specific: Persian served mainly as a literary language for the educated, while Arabic was used for Islamic prayers. In the post-Tanzimat period French became the common Western language among the educated.

Because of a low literacy rate among the public (about 2–3% until the early 19th century and just about 15% at the end of the 19th century), ordinary people had to hire scribes as "special request-writers" (arzuhâlcis) to be able to communicate with the government. Some ethnic groups continued to speak within their families and neighbourhoods (mahalles) with their own languages, though many non-Muslim minorities such as Greeks and Armenians only spoke Turkish. In villages where two or more populations lived together, the inhabitants often spoke each other's language. In cosmopolitan cities, people often spoke their family languages; in some cities, many of those who were not ethnic Turks spoke Turkish as a second language. However, not all cities used Turkish as a lingua franca.

=== Religion ===
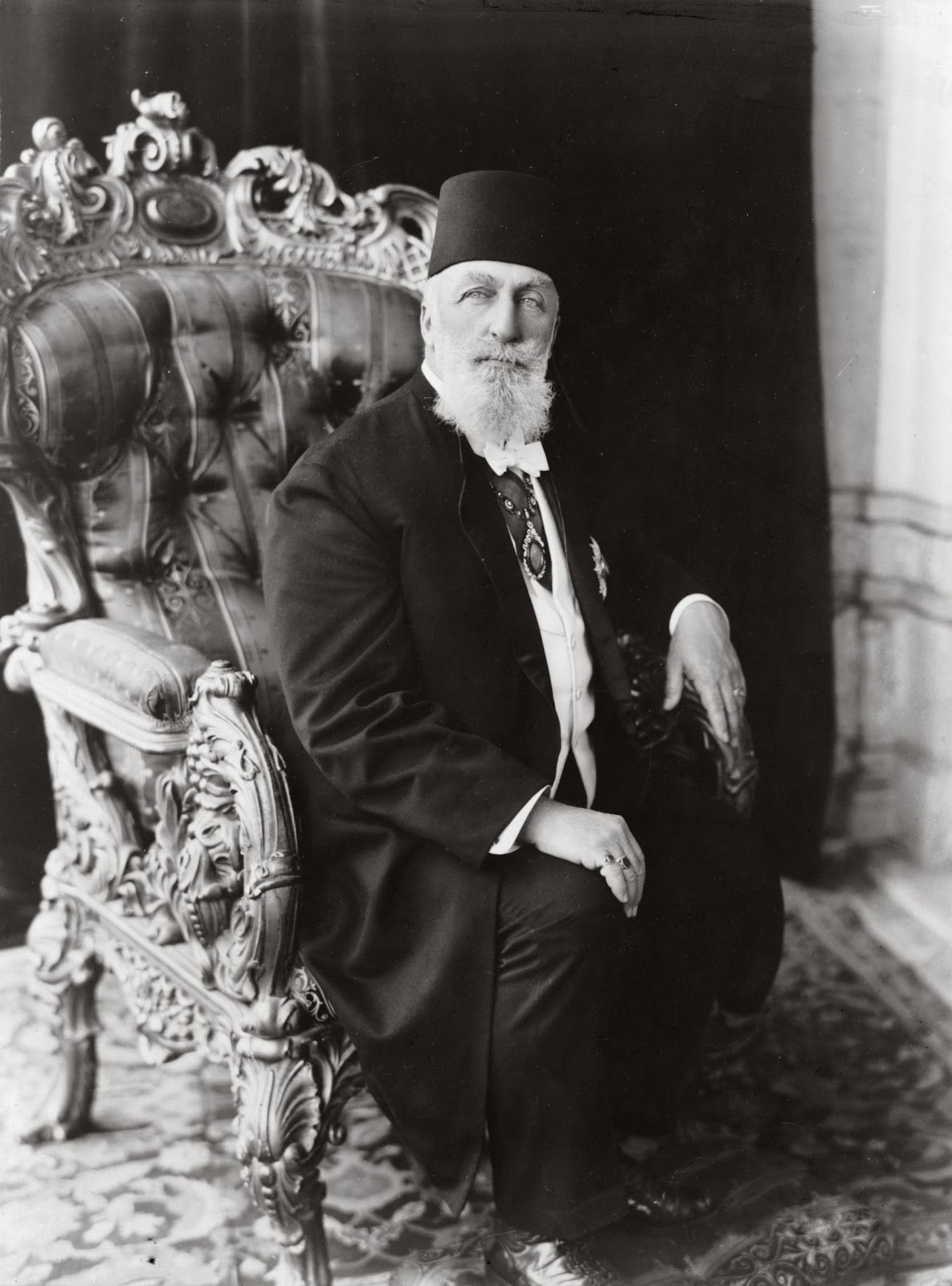
Abdülmecid II was the last caliph of Islam and a member of the Ottoman dynasty.

Sunni Islam was the prevailing Dīn (customs, legal traditions, and religion) of the Ottoman Empire; the official Madh'hab (school of Islamic jurisprudence) was Hanafi. From the early 16th century until the early 20th century, the Ottoman sultan also served as the caliph, or politico-religious leader, of the Muslim world. Most of the Ottoman Sultans adhered to Sufism and followed Sufi orders, and believed Sufism was the correct way to reach God.

Non-Muslims, particularly Christians and Jews, were present throughout the empire's history. The Ottoman imperial system was charactised by an intricate combination of official Muslim hegemony over non-Muslims and a wide degree of religious tolerance. While religious minorities were never equal under the law, they were granted recognition, protection, and limited freedoms under both Islamic and Ottoman tradition.

Until the second half of the 15th century, the majority of Ottoman subjects were Christian. Non-Muslims remained a significant and economically influential minority, albeit declining significantly by the 19th century, due largely to migration and secession. The proportion of Muslims amounted to 60% in the 1820s, gradually increasing to 69% in the 1870s and 76% in the 1890s. By 1914, less than a fifth of the empire's population (19.1%) was non-Muslim, mostly made up of Jews and Christian Greeks, Assyrians, and Armenians.

==== Islam ====
Turkic peoples practiced a form of shamanism before adopting Islam. The Muslim conquest of Transoxiana under the Abbasids facilitated the spread of Islam into the Turkic heartland of Central Asia. Many Turkic tribes—including the Oghuz Turks, who were the ancestors of both the Seljuks and the Ottomans—gradually converted to Islam and brought religion to Anatolia through their migrations beginning in the 11th century. From its founding, the Ottoman Empire officially supported the Maturidi school of Islamic theology, which emphasised human reason, rationality, the pursuit of science and philosophy (falsafa). The Ottomans were among the earliest and most enthusiastic adopters of the Hanafi school of Islamic jurisprudence, which was comparatively more flexible and discretionary in its rulings.

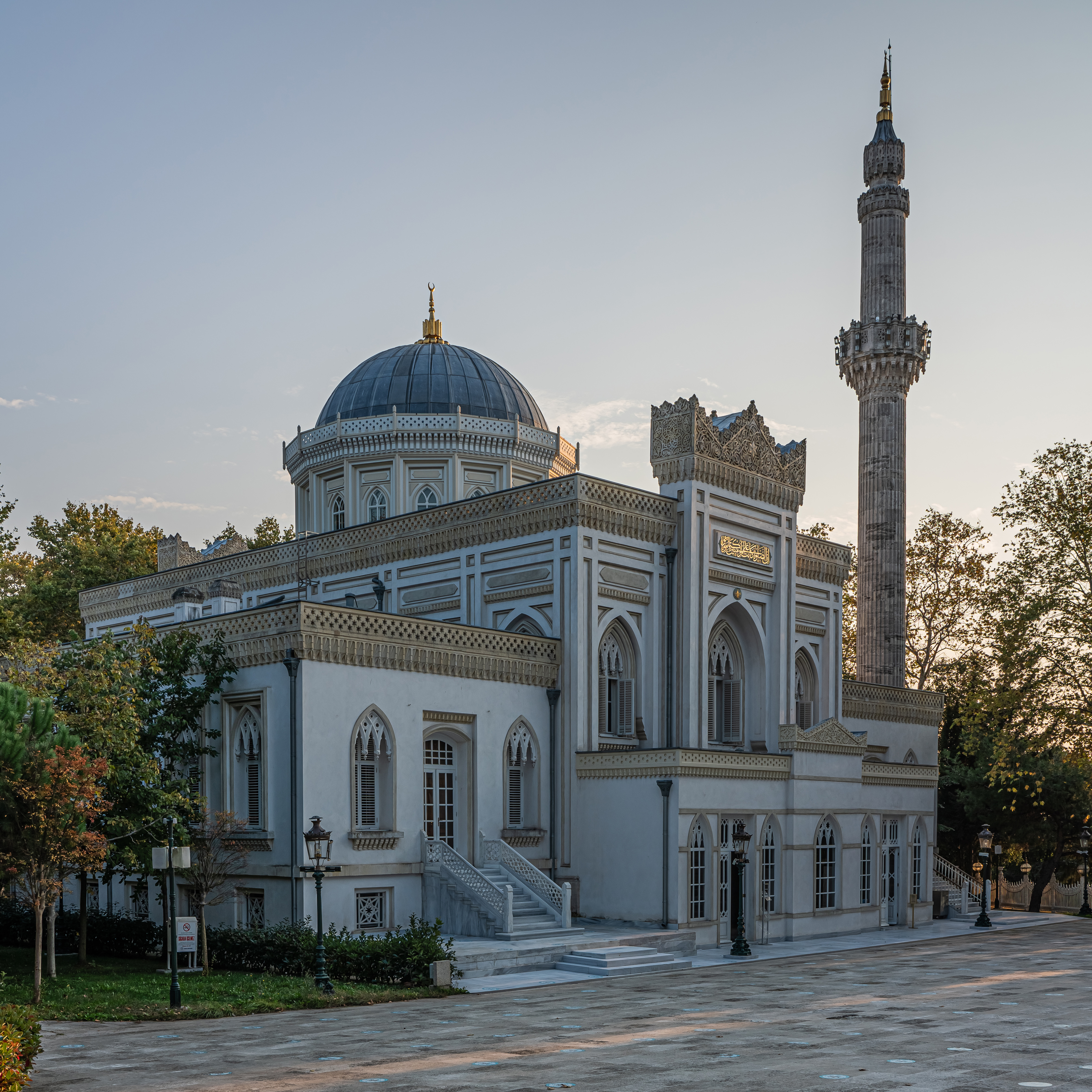
The Yıldız Hamidiye Mosque in Istanbul, Turkey

The Ottoman Empire had a wide variety of Islamic sects, including Druze, Ismailis, Alevis, and Alawites. Sufism, a diverse body of Islamic mysticism, found fertile ground in Ottoman lands; many Sufi religious orders (tariqa), such as the Bektashi and Mevlevi, were either established, or saw significant growth, throughout the empire's history. However, some heterodox Muslim groups were viewed as heretical and even ranked below Jews and Christians in terms of legal protection; Druze were frequent targets of persecution, with Ottoman authorities often citing the controversial rulings of Ibn Taymiyya, a member of the conservative Hanbali school. In 1514, Sultan Selim I ordered the massacre of 40,000 Anatolian Alevis (Qizilbash), whom he considered a fifth column for the rival Safavid Empire.

During Selim's reign, the Ottoman Empire saw an unprecedented and rapid expansion into the Middle East, particularly the conquest of the entire Mamluk Sultanate of Egypt on the early 16th century. These conquests further solidified the Ottoman claim of being an Islamic caliphate, although Ottoman sultans had been claiming the title of caliph since the reign of Murad I (1362–1389). The caliphate was officially transferred from the Mamluks to the Ottoman sultanate in 1517, whose members were recognised as caliphs until the office's abolition on 3 March 1924 by the Republic of Turkey (and the exile of the last caliph, Abdülmecid II, to France).

==== Christianity and Judaism ====
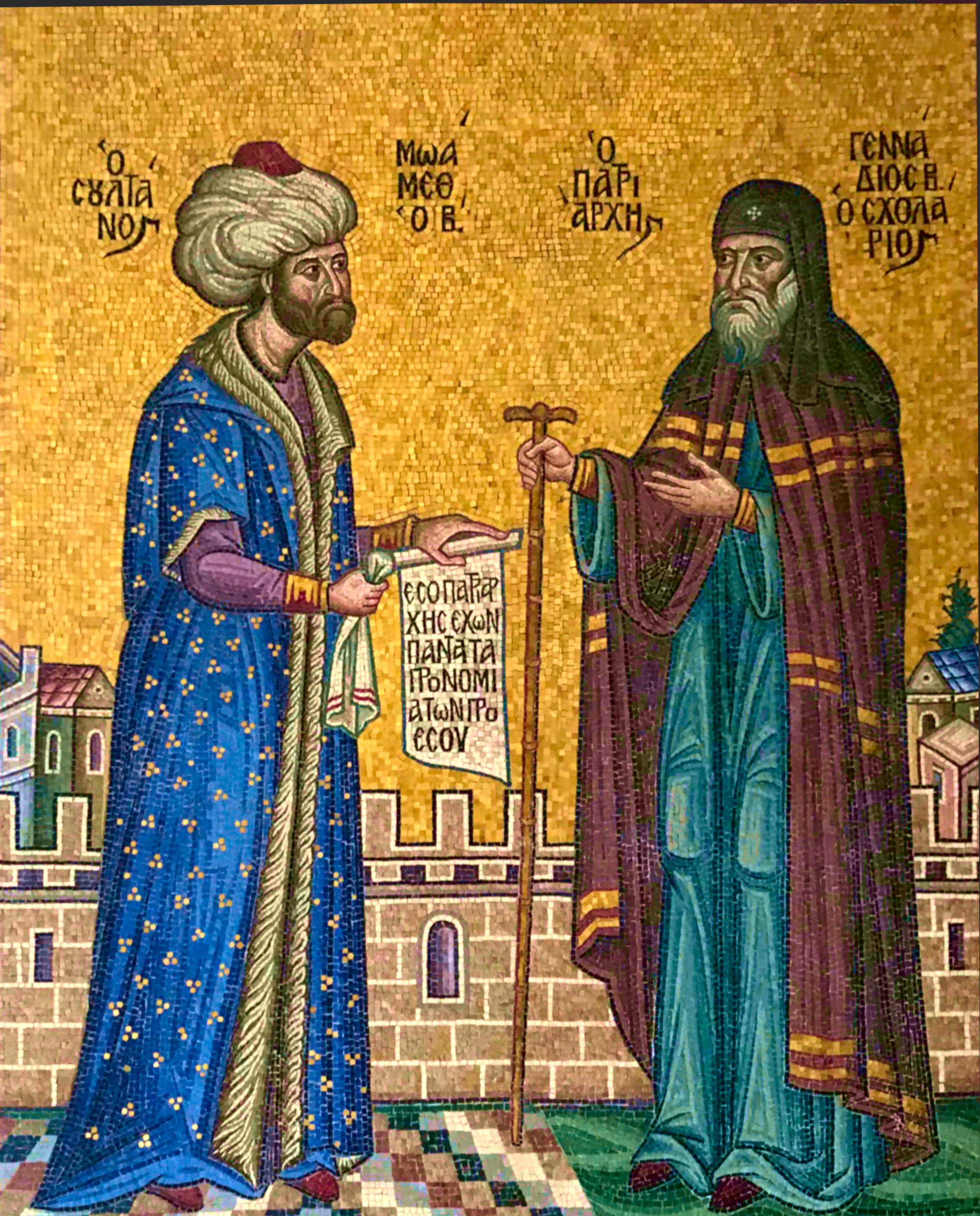
Mehmed the Conqueror and Patriarch Gennadius II

In accordance with the Muslim dhimmi system, the Ottoman Empire guaranteed limited freedoms to Christians, Jews, and other "people of the book", such as the right to worship, own property, and be exempt from the obligatory alms (zakat) required of Muslims. However, non-Muslims (or dhimmi) were subject to various legal restrictions, including being forbidden to carry weapons, ride on horseback, or have their homes overlook those of Muslims; likewise, they were required to pay higher taxes than Muslim subjects, including the jizya, which was a key source of state revenue. Many Christians and Jews converted to Islam to secure full social and legal status, though most continued to practice their faith without restriction.

The Ottomans developed a unique sociopolitical system known as the millet, which granted non-Muslim communities a large degree of political, legal, and religious autonomy; in essence, members of a millet were subjects of the empire but not subject to the Muslim faith or Islamic law. A millet could govern its own affairs, such as raising taxes and resolving internal legal disputes, with little or no interference from Ottoman authorities, so long as its members were loyal to the sultan and adhered to the rules concerning dhimmi. A quintessential example is the ancient Orthodox community of Mount Athos, which was permitted to retain its autonomy and was never subject to occupation or forced conversion; even special laws were enacted to protect it from outsiders.

The Rum Millet, which encompassed most Eastern Orthodox Christians, was governed by the Byzantine-era Corpus Juris Civilis (Code of Justinian), with the Ecumenical Patriarch designated the highest religious and political authority (millet-bashi, or ethnarch). Likewise, Ottoman Jews came under the authority of the Haham Başı, or Ottoman Chief Rabbi, while Armenians were under the authority of the chief bishop of the Armenian Apostolic Church. As the largest group of non-Muslim subjects, the Rum Millet enjoyed several special privileges in politics and commerce; however, Jews and Armenians were also well represented among the wealthy merchant class, as well as in public administration.

Some modern scholars consider the millet system to be an early example of religious pluralism, as it accorded minority religious groups official recognition and tolerance.

=== Social-political-religious structure ===
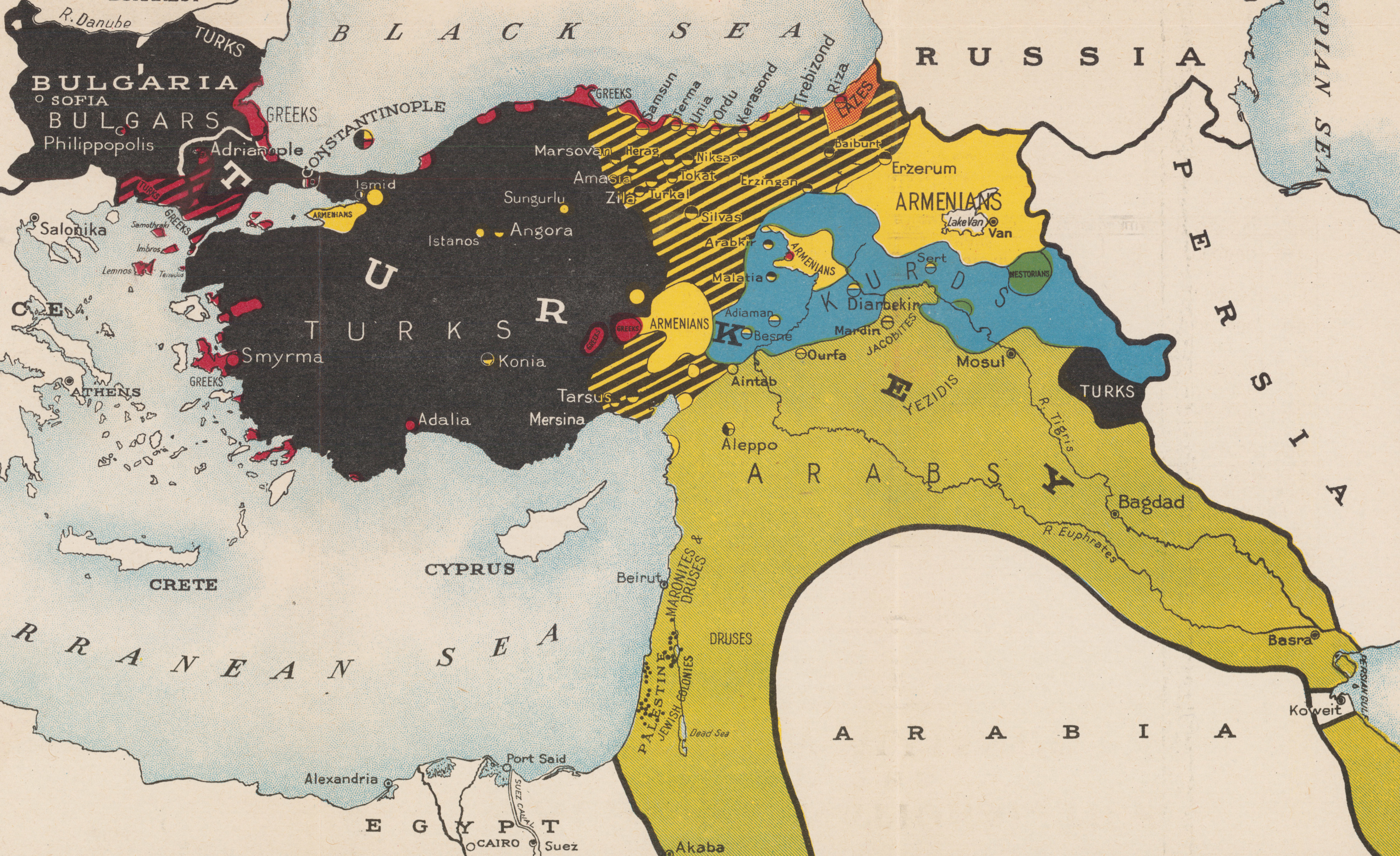
Ethnic map of the Ottoman Empire in 1917. Black = Bulgars and Turks, Red = Greeks, Light yellow = Armenians, Blue = Kurds, Orange = Lazes, Dark Yellow = Arabs, Green = Nestorians

Beginning in the early 19th century, society, government, and religion were interrelated in a complex, overlapping way that was deemed inefficient by Atatürk, who systematically dismantled it after 1922. In Constantinople, the Sultan ruled two distinct domains: the secular government and the religious hierarchy. Religious officials formed the Ulama, who had control of religious teachings and theology, and also the Empire's judicial system, giving them a major voice in day-to-day affairs in communities across the Empire (but not including the non-Muslim millets). They were powerful enough to reject the military reforms proposed by Sultan Selim III. His successor Sultan Mahmud II (r. 1808–1839) first won ulama approval before proposing similar reforms. The secularisation programme brought by Atatürk ended the ulema and their institutions. The caliphate was abolished, madrasas were closed down, and the sharia courts were abolished. He replaced the Arabic alphabet with Latin letters, ended the religious school system, and gave women some political rights. Many rural traditionalists never accepted this secularisation, and by the 1990s they were reasserting a demand for a larger role for Islam.

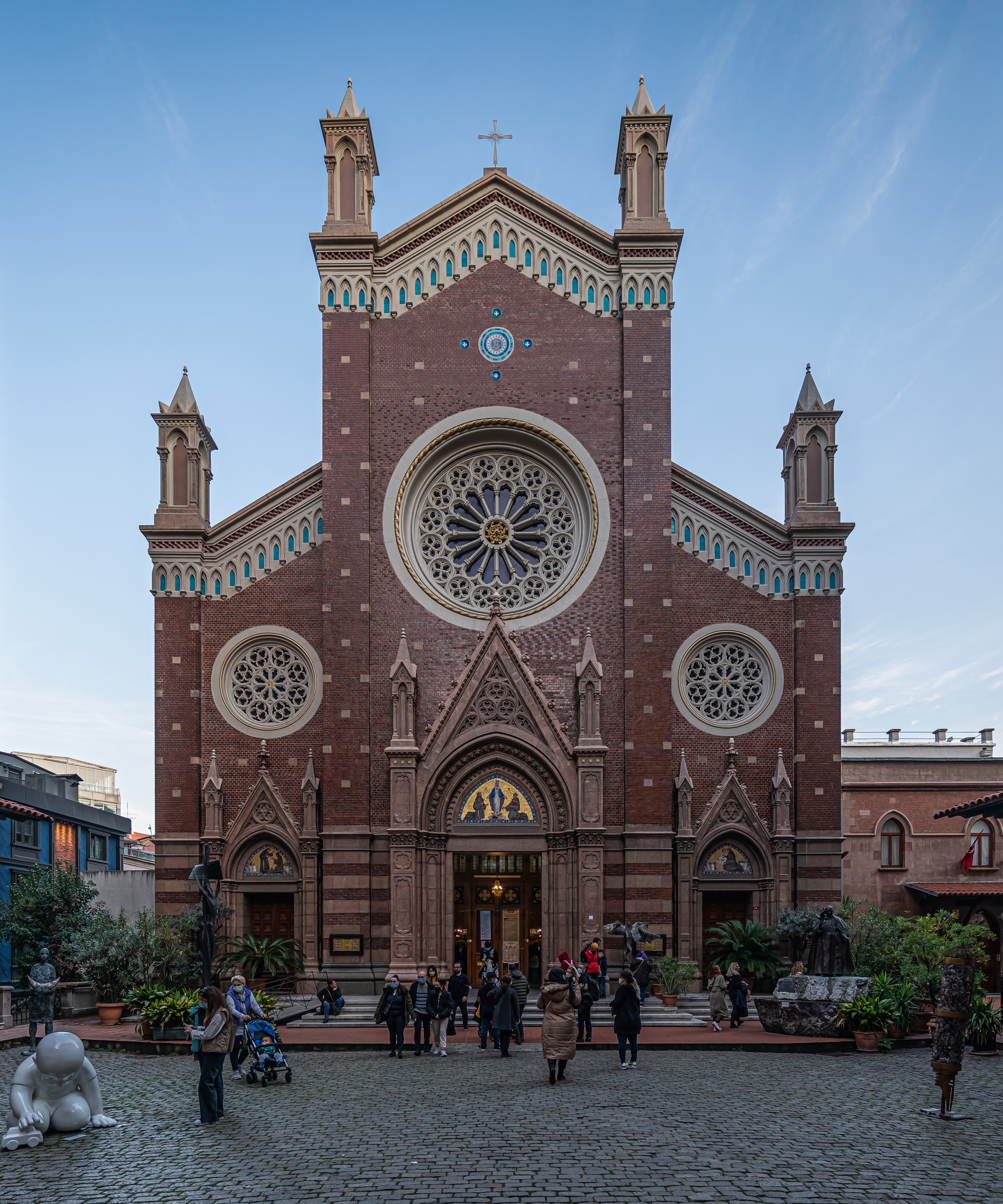
The original Church of St. Anthony of Padua, Istanbul was built in 1725 by the local Italian community of Istanbul.

The Janissaries were a highly formidable military unit in the early years, but as Western Europe modernised its military organisation technology, the Janissaries became a reactionary force that resisted all change. Steadily the Ottoman military power became outdated, but when the Janissaries felt their privileges were being threatened, or outsiders wanted to modernise them, or they might be superseded by the cavalrymen, they rose in rebellion. The rebellions were highly violent on both sides, but by the time the Janissaries were suppressed, it was far too late for Ottoman military power to catch up with the West. The political system was transformed by the destruction of the Janissaries, a powerful military/governmental/police force, which revolted in the Auspicious Incident of 1826. Sultan Mahmud II crushed the revolt, executed the leaders and disbanded the large organisation. That set the stage for a slow process of modernisation of government functions, as the government sought, with mixed success, to adopt the main elements of Western bureaucracy and military technology.

The Janissaries had been recruited from Christians and other minorities; their abolition enabled the emergence of a Turkish elite to control the Ottoman Empire. A large number of ethnic and religious minorities were tolerated in their own separate segregated domains called millets. They were primarily Greek, Armenian, or Jewish. In each locality, they governed themselves, spoke their own language, ran their own schools, cultural and religious institutions, and paid somewhat higher taxes. They had no power outside the millet. The Imperial government protected them and prevented major violent clashes between ethnic groups.

Ethnic nationalism, based on distinctive religion and language, provided a centripetal force that eventually destroyed the Ottoman Empire. In addition, Muslim ethnic groups, which were not part of the millet system, especially the Arabs and the Kurds, were outside the Turkish culture and developed their own separate nationalism. The British sponsored Arab nationalism in the First World War, promising an independent Arab state in return for Arab support. Most Arabs supported the Sultan, but those near Mecca believed in and supported the British promise.

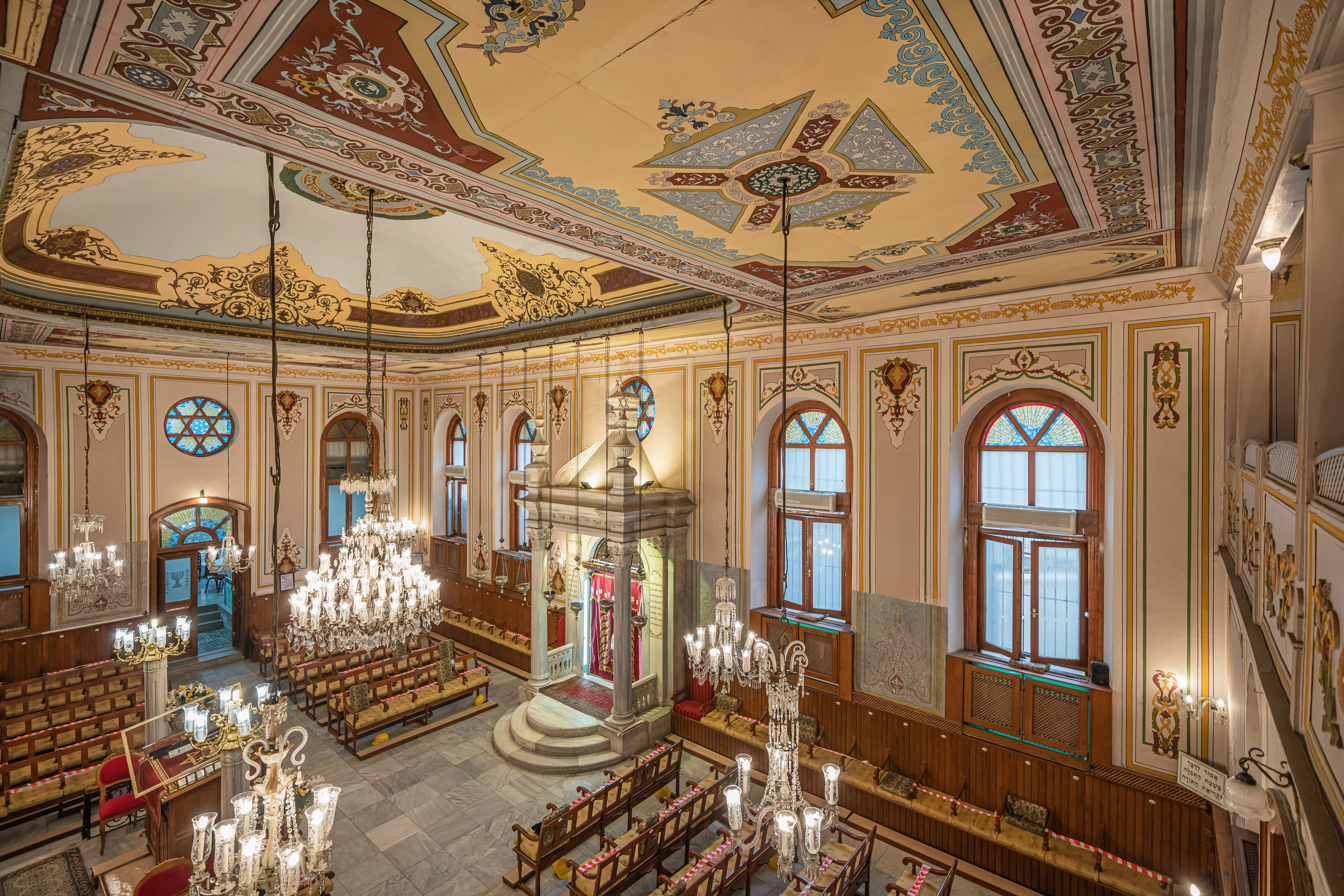
Hemdat Israel Synagogue of Istanbul

At the local level, power was held beyond the control of the Sultan by the ayans or local notables. The ayan collected taxes, formed local armies to compete with other notables, took a reactionary attitude toward political or economic change, and often defied policies handed down by the Sultan.

After the 18th century, the Ottoman Empire was shrinking, as Russia put on heavy pressure and expanded to its south; Egypt became effectively independent in 1805, and the British later took it over, along with Cyprus. Greece became independent, and Serbia and other Balkan areas became highly restive as the force of nationalism pushed against imperialism. The French took over Algeria and Tunisia. The Europeans all thought that the empire was a sick man in rapid decline. Only the Germans seemed helpful, and their support led to the Ottoman Empire joining the central powers in 1915, with the result that they came out as one of the heaviest losers of the First World War in 1918.

== Culture ==
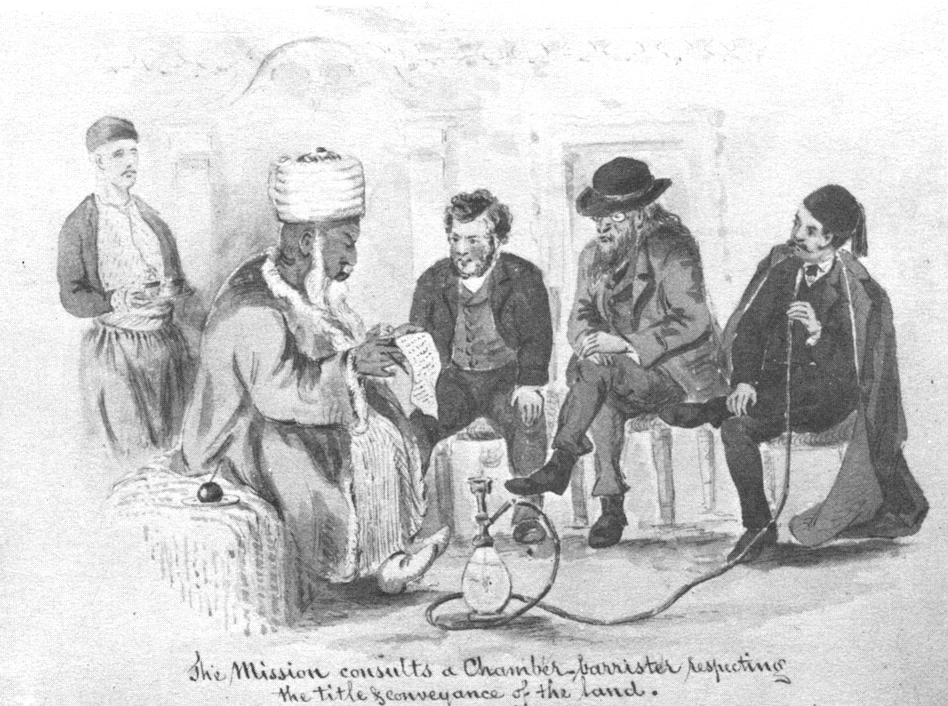
Depiction of a hookah shop in Lebanon

The Ottomans absorbed some of the traditions, art, and institutions of cultures in the regions they conquered and added new dimensions to them. Numerous traditions and cultural traits of previous empires (in fields such as architecture, cuisine, music, leisure, and government) were adopted by the Ottoman Turks, who developed them into new forms, resulting in a new and distinctively Ottoman cultural identity. Although the predominant literary language of the Ottoman Empire was Turkish, Persian was the preferred vehicle for the projection of an imperial image.

Slavery was part of Ottoman society, with most slaves employed as domestic servants or in the case of female slaves as concubines (sexual slaves). Agricultural slavery, such as that in the Americas, was relatively rare. The child of a slave was born a slave, unless the male slave owner acknowledged the child of his female slave as his, in which case the child would be automatically free by law. Female slaves were still sold in the Empire as late as 1908. During the 19th century the Empire came under pressure from Western European countries to outlaw the practice. Policies developed by various sultans throughout the 19th century attempted to curtail the Ottoman slave trade but slavery had centuries of religious backing and sanction and so was never abolished in the Empire.

Ottomans adopted Persian bureaucratic traditions and culture. The sultans also made an important contribution in the development of Persian literature.

Language was not an obvious sign of group connection and identity in the 16th century among the rulers of the Ottoman Empire, Safavid Iran and Abu'l-Khayrid Shibanids of Central Asia. Hence the ruling classes of all three polities were bilingual in varieties of Persian and Turkic. But in the century's final quarter, linguistic adjustments occurred in the Ottoman and Safavid realms defined by a new rigidity that favoured Ottoman Turkish and Persian, respectively.

=== Education ===
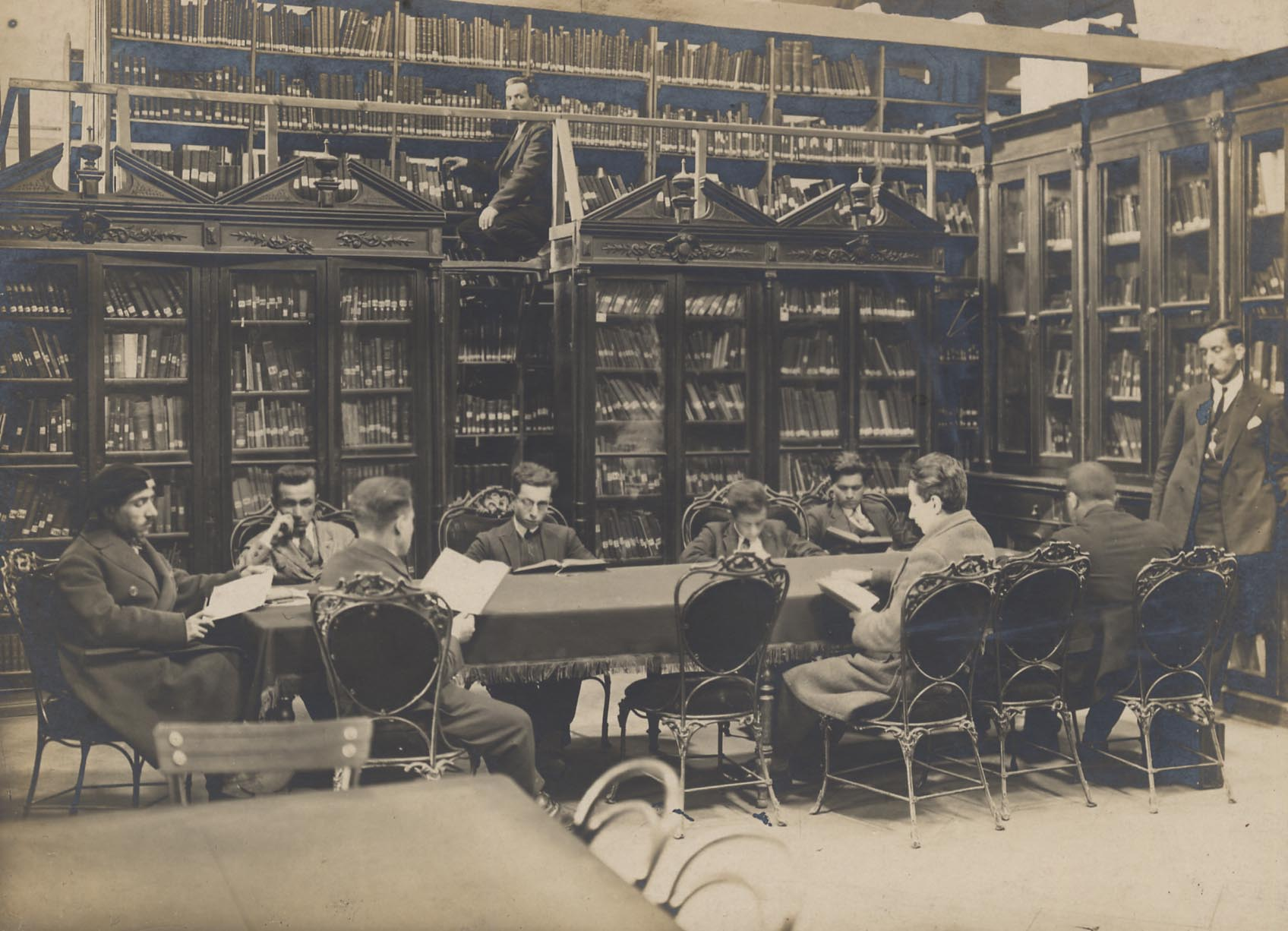
The Beyazıt State Library was founded in 1884.

In the Ottoman Empire, each millet established a schooling system serving its members. Education was therefore largely divided on ethnic and religious lines: few non-Muslims attended schools for Muslim students, and vice versa. Most institutions that served all ethnic and religious groups taught in French or other languages.

Several "foreign schools" (Frerler mektebleri) operated by religious clergy primarily served Christians, although some Muslim students attended. Garnett described the schools for Christians and Jews as "organised upon European models", with "voluntary contributions" supporting their operation and most of them "well attended" and with "a high standard of education".

=== Literature ===
The two primary streams of Ottoman written literature are poetry and prose. Poetry was by far the dominant stream. The earliest work of Ottoman historiography for example, the İskendernâme, was composed by the poet Taceddin Ahmedi. Until the 19th century, Ottoman prose did not contain any examples of fiction: there were no counterparts to, for instance, the European romance, short story, or novel. Analog genres did exist, though, in both Turkish folk literature and in Divan poetry.

Ottoman Divan poetry was a highly ritualised and symbolic art form. From the Persian poetry that largely inspired it, it inherited a wealth of symbols whose meanings and interrelationships—both of similitude (مراعات نظير mura'ât-i nazîr / تناسب tenâsüb) and opposition (تضاد tezâd) were more or less prescribed. Divan poetry was composed through the constant juxtaposition of many such images within a strict metrical framework, allowing numerous potential meanings to emerge. The vast majority of Divan poetry was lyric in nature: either gazels (which make up the greatest part of the repertoire of the tradition), or kasîdes. But there were other common genres, especially the mesnevî, a kind of verse romance and thus a variety of narrative poetry; the two most notable examples of this form are the Leyli and Majnun of Fuzuli and the Hüsn ü Aşk of Şeyh Gâlib. The Seyahatnâme of Evliya Çelebi (1611–1682) is an outstanding example of travel literature.

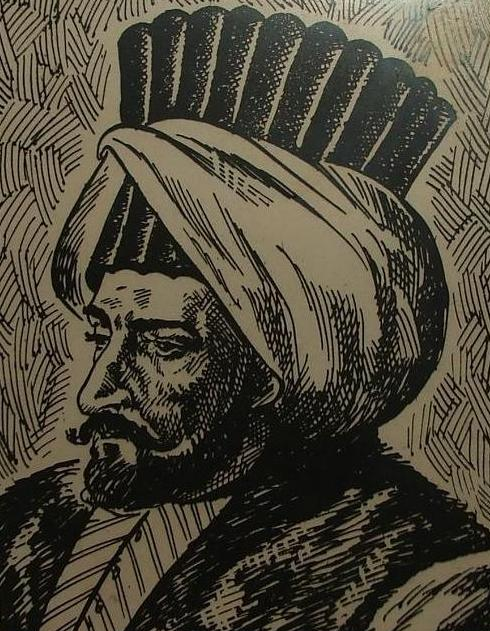
Ahmet Nedîm Efendi, one of the most celebrated Ottoman poets

Until the 19th century, Ottoman prose did not develop to the extent that contemporary Divan poetry did. A large part of the reason was that much prose was expected to adhere to the rules of sec (سجع, also transliterated as seci), or rhymed prose, a type of writing descended from the Arabic saj' that prescribed that between each adjective and noun in a string of words, such as a sentence, there must be a rhyme. Nevertheless, there was a tradition of prose in the literature of the time, though it was exclusively nonfictional. One apparent exception was Muhayyelât (Fancies) by Giritli Ali Aziz Efendi, a collection of stories of the fantastic written in 1796, though not published until 1867. The first novel published in the Ottoman Empire was Vartan Pasha's 1851 The Story of Akabi (Turkish: Akabi Hikyayesi). It was written in Turkish but with Armenian script.

Due to historically close ties with France, French literature constituted the major Western influence on Ottoman literature in the latter half of the 19th century. As a result, many of the same movements prevalent in France during this period had Ottoman equivalents; in the developing Ottoman prose tradition, for instance, the influence of Romanticism can be seen during the Tanzimat period, and that of the Realist and Naturalist movements in subsequent periods; in the poetic tradition, on the other hand, the influence of the Symbolist and Parnassian movements was paramount.

Many of the writers in the Tanzimat period wrote in several different genres simultaneously. This diversity was, in part, due to Tanzimat writers' wish to disseminate as much of the new literature as possible, in the hopes that it would contribute to a revitalisation of Ottoman social structures.

=== Media ===
The media of the Ottoman Empire was diverse, with newspapers and journals published in languages including French, Greek, and German. Many of these publications were centred in Constantinople, but there were also French-language newspapers produced in Beirut, Salonika, and Smyrna. Non-Muslim ethnic minorities in the empire used French as a lingua franca and used French-language publications, while some provincial newspapers were published in Arabic. The use of French in the media persisted until the end of the empire in 1923 and for a few years thereafter in the Republic of Turkey.

=== Architecture ===
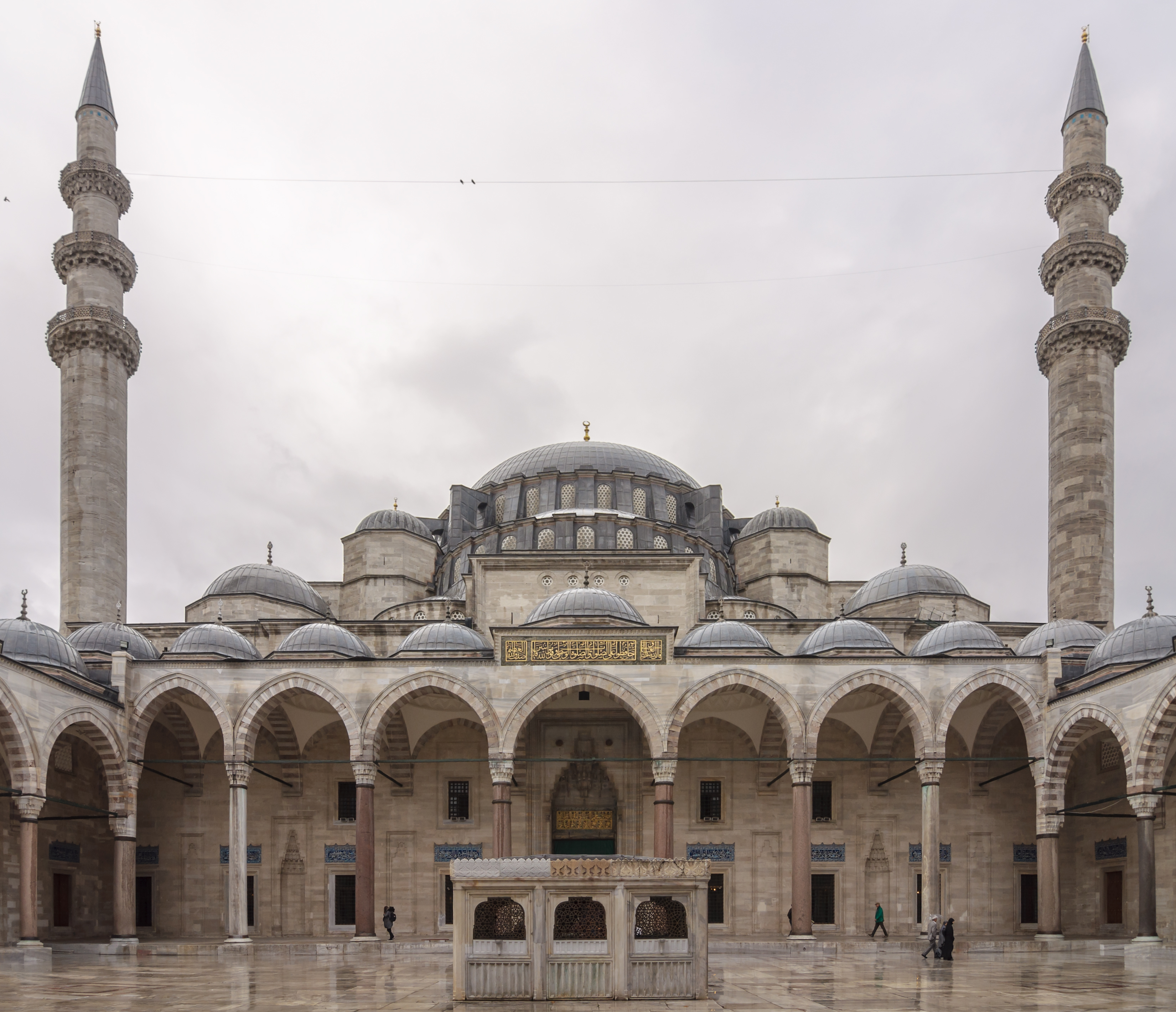
Süleymaniye Mosque in Istanbul, designed by Mimar Sinan in the 16th century and a major example of the classical Ottoman style

The architecture of the empire developed from earlier Seljuk Turkish architecture, with influences from Byzantine and Iranian architecture and other architectural traditions in the Middle East. Early Ottoman architecture experimented with multiple building types over the course of the 13th to 15th centuries, progressively evolving into the classical Ottoman style of the 16th and 17th centuries, which was also strongly influenced by the Hagia Sophia. The most important architect of the Classical period is Mimar Sinan, whose major works include the Şehzade Mosque, Süleymaniye Mosque, and Selimiye Mosque. The second half of the 16th century also saw the apogee of some types of decoration, most notably in the production of Iznik tiles.

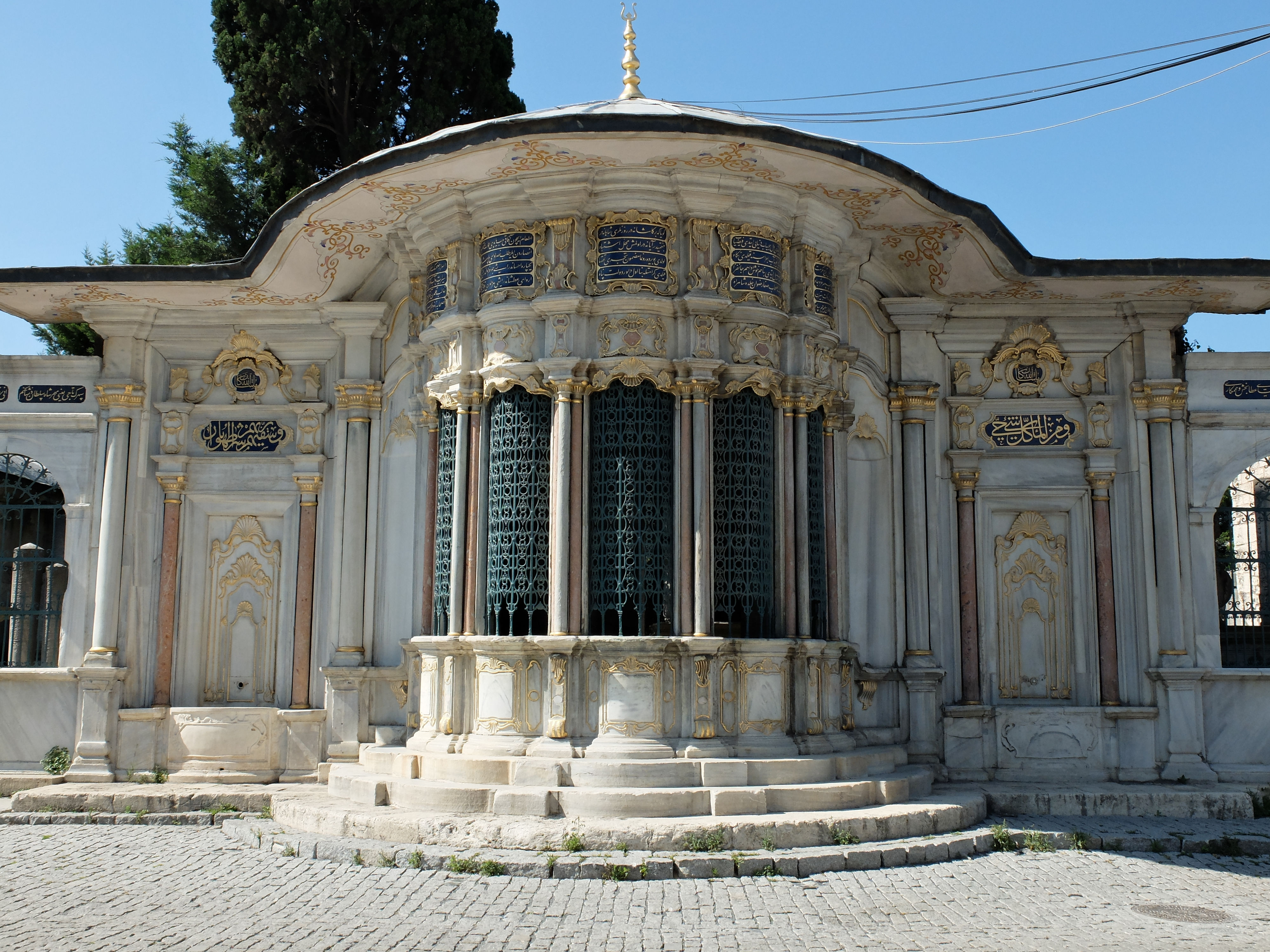
Sebil (water distribution kiosk) of the Mihrişah Sultan Complex in Istanbul, from the late 18th century, an example of the Ottoman Baroque style

Beginning in the 18th century, Ottoman architecture was opened to external influences, particularly from Baroque architecture in Western Europe, which eventually gave rise to the Ottoman Baroque style that emerged in the 1740s. The Nuruosmaniye Mosque is one of the most important examples from this period. During the 19th century, influences from Western Europe became more prominent, brought in by architects such as those from the Balyan family. Empire style and Neoclassical motifs were introduced and a trend towards eclecticism was evident in many types of buildings, such as the Dolmabaçe Palace. The last decades of the Ottoman Empire also saw the development of a new architectural style called neo-Ottoman or Ottoman revivalism, also known as the First National Architectural Movement, by architects such as Mimar Kemaleddin and Vedat Tek.

Ottoman dynastic patronage was concentrated in the historic capitals of Bursa, Edirne, and Istanbul (Constantinople), as well as in several other important administrative centres such as Amasya and Manisa. It was in these centres that most important developments in Ottoman architecture occurred and that the most monumental Ottoman architecture can be found. Major religious monuments were typically architectural complexes, known as a külliye, that had multiple components providing different services or amenities. In addition to a mosque, these could include a madrasa, a hammam, an imaret, a sebil, a market, a caravanserai, a primary school, or others. These complexes were governed and managed with the help of a vakıf agreement (Arabic waqf). Ottoman constructions were still abundant in Anatolia and in the Balkans (Rumelia), but in the more distant Middle Eastern and North African provinces older Islamic architectural styles continued to hold strong influence and were sometimes blended with Ottoman styles.

=== Decorative arts ===
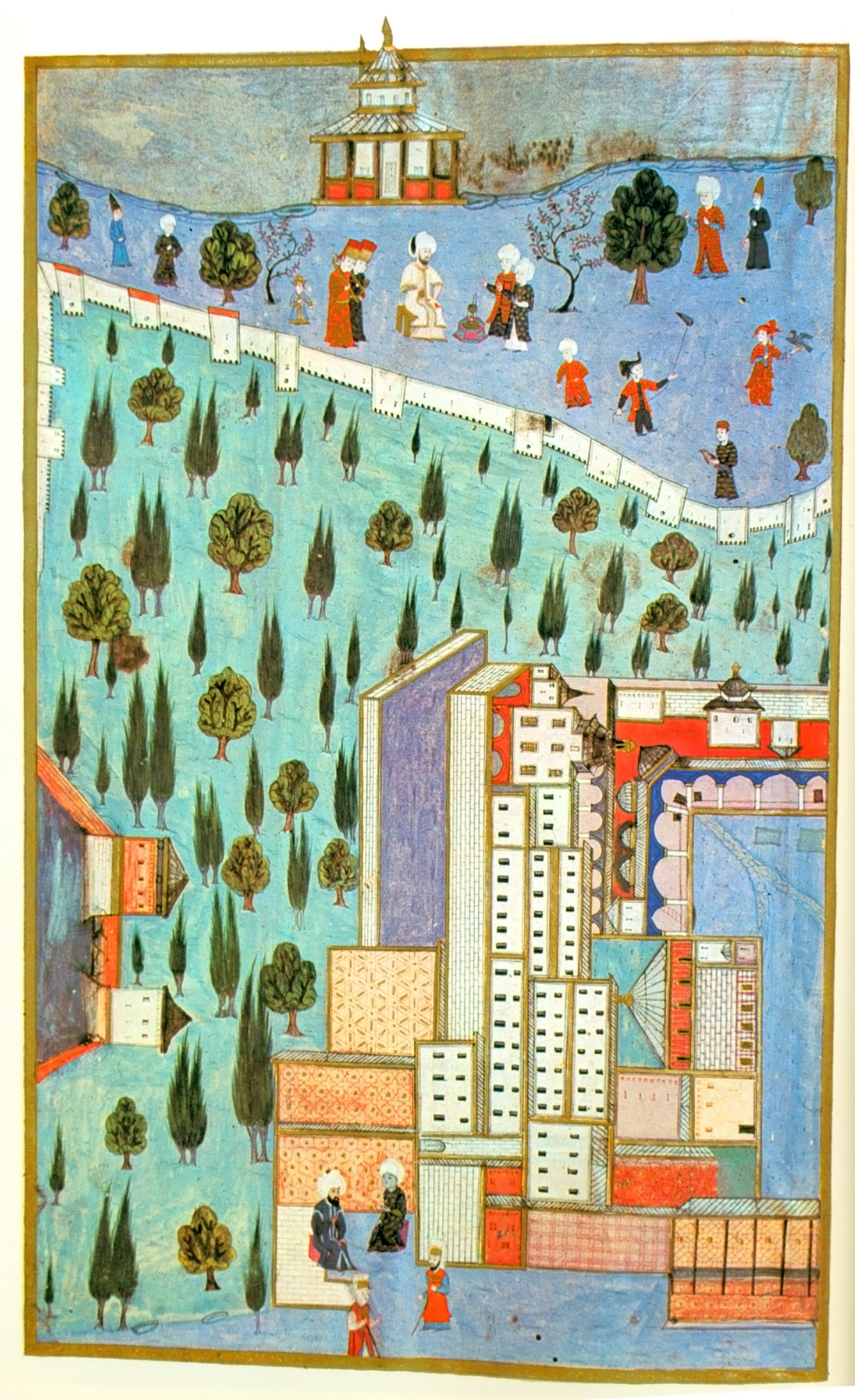
Ottoman miniature lost its function with the Westernisation of Ottoman culture.

The tradition of Ottoman miniatures, painted to illustrate manuscripts or used in dedicated albums, was heavily influenced by the Persian art form, though it also included elements of the Byzantine tradition of illumination and painting. A Greek academy of painters, the Nakkashane-i-Rum, was established in the Topkapi Palace in the 15th century, while early in the following century a similar Persian academy, the Nakkashane-i-Irani, was added. Surname-i Hümayun (Imperial Festival Books) were albums that commemorated celebrations in the Ottoman Empire in pictorial and textual detail.

Ottoman illumination covers non-figurative painted or drawn decorative art in books or on sheets in muraqqa or albums, as opposed to the figurative images of the Ottoman miniature. It was a part of the Ottoman Book Arts together with the Ottoman miniature (taswir), calligraphy (hat), Islamic calligraphy, bookbinding (cilt) and paper marbling (ebru). In the Ottoman Empire, illuminated and illustrated manuscripts were commissioned by the Sultan or the administrators of the court. In Topkapi Palace, these manuscripts were created by the artists working in Nakkashane, the atelier of the miniature and illumination artists. Both religious and non-religious books could be illuminated. Also, sheets for albums levha consisted of illuminated calligraphy (hat) of tughra, religious texts, verses from poems or proverbs, and purely decorative drawings.

The art of carpet weaving was particularly significant in the Ottoman Empire, carpets having an immense importance both as decorative furnishings, rich in religious and other symbolism and as a practical consideration, as it was customary to remove one's shoes in living quarters. The weaving of such carpets originated in the nomadic cultures of central Asia (carpets being an easily transportable form of furnishing), and eventually spread to the settled societies of Anatolia. Turks used carpets, rugs, and kilims not just on the floors of a room but also as a hanging on walls and doorways, where they provided additional insulation. They were also commonly donated to mosques, which often amassed large collections of them.

=== Music and performing arts ===
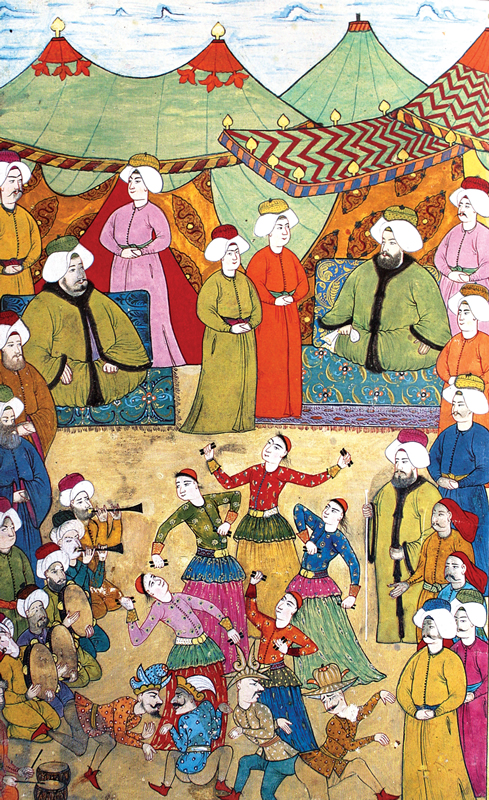
Musicians and dancers entertaining the crowds, from the Surname-i Hümayun, 1720

Ottoman classical music was an important part of the education of the Ottoman elite. A number of the Ottoman sultans have accomplished musicians and composers themselves, such as Selim III, whose compositions are often still performed today. Ottoman classical music arose largely from a confluence of Byzantine music, Armenian music, Arabic music, and Persian music. Compositionally, it is organised around rhythmic units called usul, which are somewhat similar to metre in Western music, and melodic units called makam, which bear some resemblance to Western musical modes.

The instruments used are a mixture of Anatolian and Central Asian instruments (the saz, the bağlama, the kemence), other Middle Eastern instruments (the ud, the tanbur, the kanun, the ney), and—later in the tradition—Western instruments (the violin and the piano). Because of a geographic and cultural divide between the capital and other areas, two broadly distinct styles of music arose in the Ottoman Empire: Ottoman classical music and folk music. In the provinces, several different kinds of folk music were created. The most dominant regions with their distinguished musical styles are Balkan-Thracian Türküs, North-Eastern (Laz) Türküs, Aegean Türküs, Central Anatolian Türküs, Eastern Anatolian Türküs, and Caucasian Türküs. Some of the distinctive styles were: Janissary music, Roma music, Belly dance, Turkish folk music.

The traditional shadow play called Karagöz and Hacivat was widespread throughout the Ottoman Empire and featured characters representing all of the major ethnic and social groups in that culture. It was performed by a single puppet master, who voiced all of the characters, and accompanied by tambourine (def). Its origins are obscure, deriving perhaps from an older Egyptian tradition, or possibly from an Asian source.

=== Cuisine ===
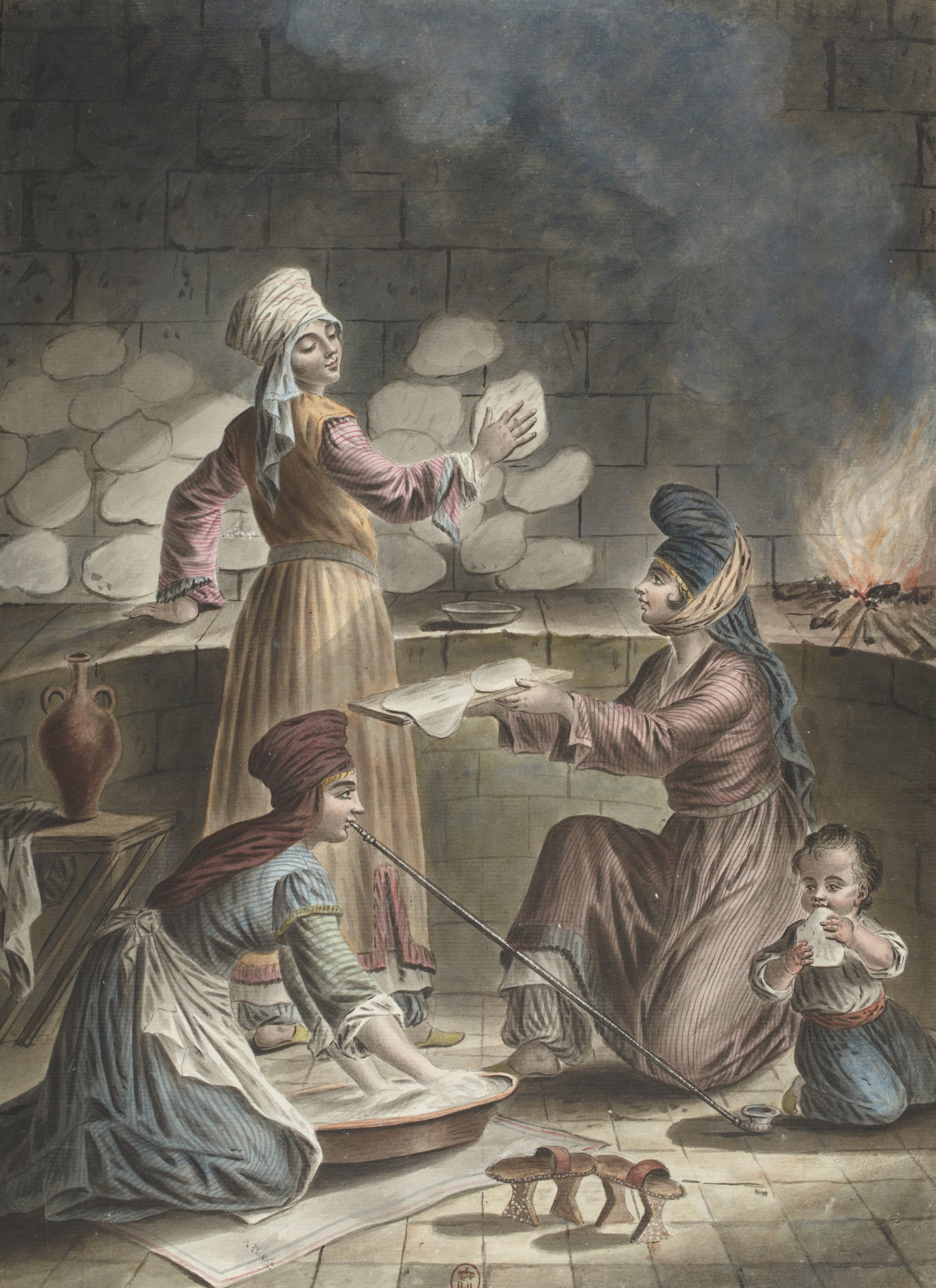
Turkish women baking bread, 1790

Ottoman cuisine is the cuisine of the capital, Constantinople (Istanbul), and the regional capital cities, where the melting pot of cultures created a common cuisine that most of the population regardless of ethnicity shared. This diverse cuisine was honed in the Imperial Palace's kitchens by chefs brought from certain parts of the Empire to create and experiment with different ingredients. The creations of the Ottoman Palace's kitchens filtered to the population, for instance through Ramadan events, and through the cooking at the Yalıs of the Pashas, and from there on spread to the rest of the population.

Much of the cuisine of former Ottoman territories today is descended from a shared Ottoman cuisine, especially Turkish, and including Greek, Balkan, Armenian, and Middle Eastern cuisines.

=== Sports ===
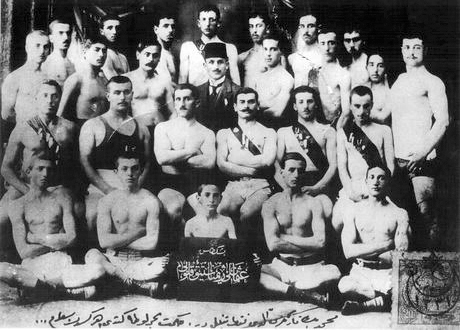
Members of Beşiktaş J.K. in 1903

The main sports Ottomans were engaged in were Turkish wrestling, hunting, Turkish archery, horseback riding, equestrian javelin throw, arm wrestling, and swimming. European model sports clubs were formed with the spreading popularity of football matches in 19th-century Constantinople. The leading clubs, according to timeline, were Beşiktaş Gymnastics Club (1903), Galatasaray Sports Club (1905), Fenerbahçe Sports Club (1907), MKE Ankaragücü (formerly Turan Sanatkarangücü) (1910) in Constantinople. Football clubs were formed in other provinces too, such as Karşıyaka Sports Club (1912), Altay Sports Club (1914) and Turkish Fatherland Football Club (later Ülküspor) (1914) of İzmir.

== Science and technology ==
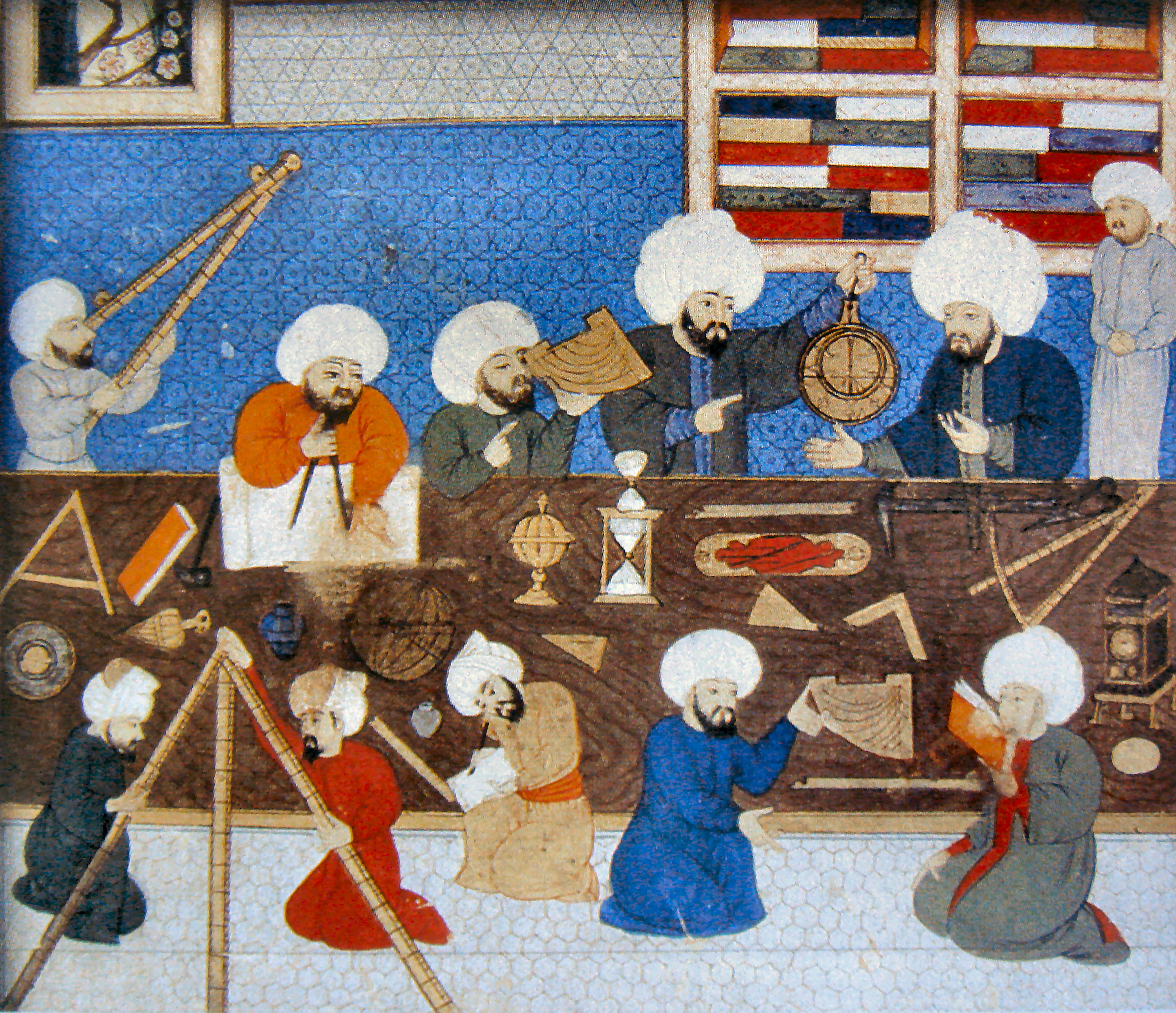
The Constantinople observatory of Taqi ad-Din in 1577

Over the course of Ottoman history, the Ottomans managed to build a large collection of libraries complete with translations of books from other cultures, as well as original manuscripts. A great part of this desire for local and foreign manuscripts arose in the 15th century. Sultan Mehmet II ordered Georgios Amiroutzes, a Greek scholar from Trabzon, to translate and make available to Ottoman educational institutions the geography book of Ptolemy. Another example is Ali Qushji – an astronomer, mathematician and physicist originally from Samarkand – who became a professor in two madrasas and influenced Ottoman circles as a result of his writings and the activities of his students, even though he only spent two or three years in Constantinople before his death.

Taqi al-Din built the Constantinople observatory of Taqi ad-Din in 1577, where he carried out observations until 1580. He calculated the eccentricity of the Sun's orbit and the annual motion of the apogee. However, the observatory's primary purpose was almost certainly astrological rather than astronomical, leading to its destruction in 1580 due to the rise of a clerical faction that opposed its use for that purpose. He also experimented with steam power in Ottoman Egypt in 1551, when he described a steam jack driven by a rudimentary steam turbine.

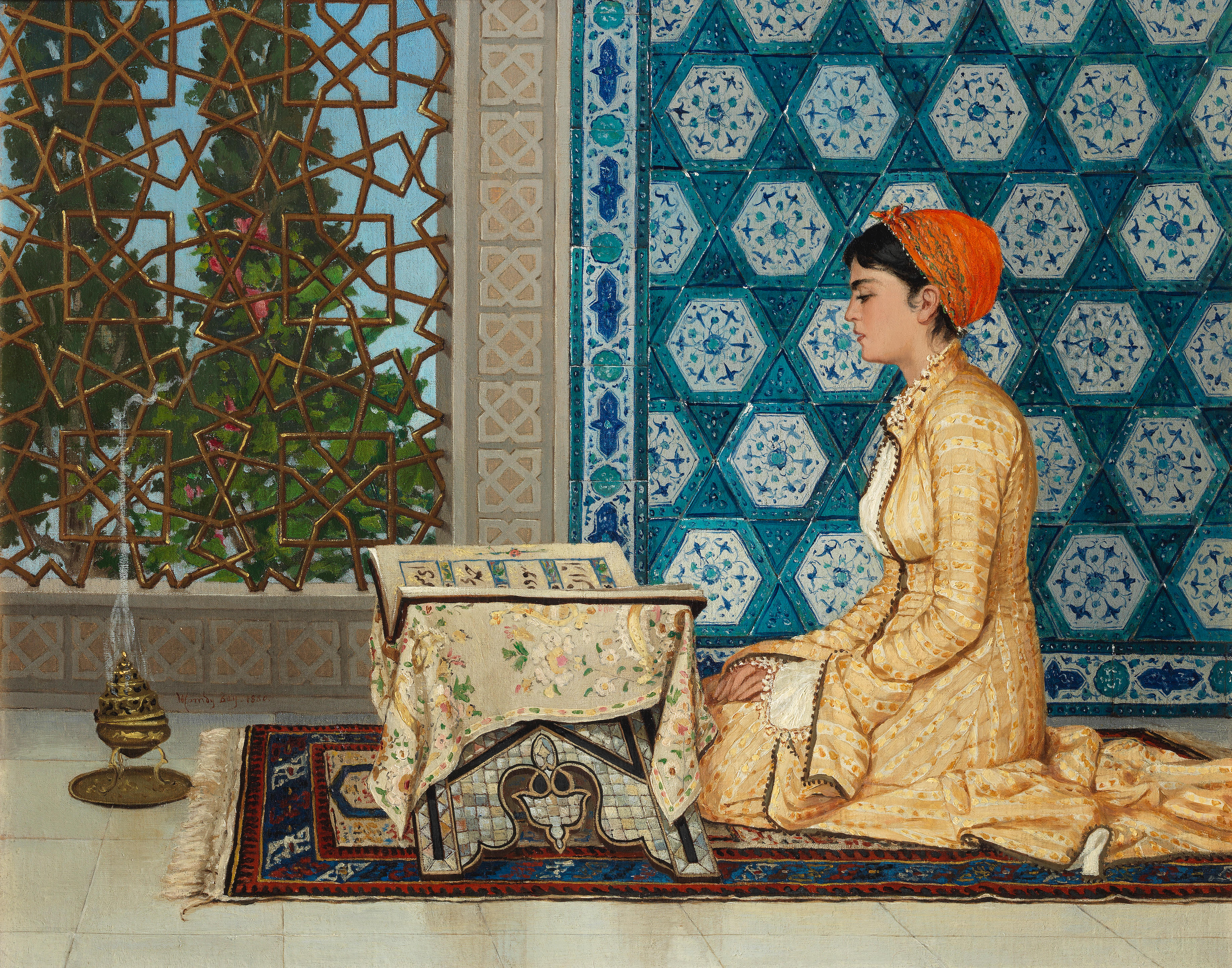
Girl Reciting the Qurān (Kuran Okuyan Kız), an 1880 painting by the Ottoman polymath Osman Hamdi Bey, whose works often showed women engaged in educational activities

Şerafeddin Sabuncuoğlu was the author of the first surgical atlas and the last major medical encyclopaedia from the Islamic world. The Ottoman Empire is credited with the invention of several surgical instruments in use such as forceps, catheters, scalpels and lancets as well as pincers.

In the early 19th century, Egypt under Muhammad Ali began using steam engines for industrial manufacturing, with industries such as ironworks, textile manufacturing, paper mills and hulling mills moving towards steam power. Economic historian Jean Batou argues that the necessary economic conditions existed in Egypt for the adoption of oil as a potential energy source for its steam engines later in the 19th century.

== See also ==
- 16 Great Turkic Empires – Concept in Turkish ethnic nationalism
- Bibliography of the Ottoman Empire
- Empire of the Sultans – Touring Islamic art exhibition (1995–2004)
- Foreign relations of the Ottoman Empire
- Gunpowder empires – Term for early modern Muslim empires
- Historiography of the Ottoman Empire
- List of battles involving the Ottoman Empire
- List of foreigners who were in the service of the Ottoman Empire
- Dragoman
- Osmanoğlu family
- List of Ottoman conquests, sieges and landings
- List of wars involving the Ottoman Empire
- Ottoman wars in Europe – Series of military conflicts between the Ottoman Empire and various European states
- Outline of the Ottoman Empire – Overview of and topical guide to the Ottoman Empire
- Turkic history – History of the Turkic peoples
- Vassal and tributary states of the Ottoman Empire
