= Sadd-i Iskandari =

Only Alexander legend in Chagatai Turkish

The Sadd-i Iskandarī (Alexander's Wall) was composed by Ali-Shir Nava'i (1441–1501) in the second half of the fifteenth century. It is the only rendition of the Alexander Romance in Chagatai Turkish. Alexander legends did exist in other forms of Turkish though, such as Taceddin Ahmedi's Iskendername.

The name of Nava'i's work is a reminder of the story of Dhu al-Qarnayn, whom Nava'i believes to be Alexander the Great. As described in the Quran, Dhu al-Qarnayn (Alexander) is entrusted by God to build a wall sealing away the apocalyptic tribes Gog and Magog. The text proceeds in four main parts:

- The Andarz section, involving a general discussion of aspirations, aims, and ideals.
- The Ḥikāyat section, involving a story of the beggar-king.
- The Ḥikmat section, where Alexander converses with Aristotle regarding the best way to achieve one's aim.
- The Dāstān section, involving a biography of Alexander

The Sadd-i Iskandari was a section of a larger text that acted as the equivalent of Nava'i's own version of Nizami Ganjavi's Khamsa. More specifically, the Sadd-i Iskandari was his version of Nizami's Iskandarnameh, and it was composed in the same meter (mutaqārib) as Nizami's. Nava'i composed his text roughly the same time, though slightly after, the Persian poet Jami completed his own Kherad-nâme (Book of Alexandrian Intelligence), which influenced Nava'i's text. The two poets had a close relationship, and Nava'i was the disciple of Jami. In Nava'i's own Khamsa, he acknowledges the influence of his teacher in the prologue of each mathnawi.

== See also ==
- Alexander the Great in legend
- Qissat al-Iskandar
