= Padishah =

Persian title

Padishah (/ˌpɑːdɪˈʃɑː/; Persian: پادشاه pādshāh [pɒːdeˈʃɒːɦ] – lit. 'Master King') (Note: From Classical Persian pād [or Old Persian: *pati] 'master', and shāh 'king'.) (Note: Also romanised as padeshah, padshah or baadshah.) (Note: Known in other languages as padşah [pɑːtˈʃɑːh] (Azeri); پادشاه pâdişâh (Ottoman Turkish); padişah [paːdiˈʃaːh] (Modern Turkish); подшоҳ podshoh (Tajik); बादशाह/بادشاہ bāadśāh (Hindi–Urdu).) is a superlative sovereign title of Persian origin.

A form of the word is known already from Middle Persian (or Pahlavi) as pātaxšā(h) or pādixšā(y). Middle Persian pād may stem from Avestan pa^{i}ti, and is akin to Pati (title). Xšāy 'to rule' and xšāyaθiya 'king' are both from Old Persian.

It was adopted by several monarchs claiming the highest rank, roughly equivalent to the ancient Persian notion of "Great King" and to the Western high king, and later adopted by post-Achaemenid and the Mughal emperors of India. However, in some periods it was used more generally for autonomous Muslim rulers, as in the Hudud al-'Alam of the 10th century, where even some petty princes of Afghanistan are called pādshā(h)/pādshāʼi/pādshāy.

== Extent ==
The rulers on the following thrones – the first two effectively commanding major West Asian empires – were styled Padishah:

- The Shahanshah of Iran, originating mainly with the Safavids
- The Padishah of the Ottoman Empire
- The Badshah of the Mughal Empire
- Some Seljuk rulers, like Grand Seljuk Ahmad Sanjar (as padishah-i sharq-u gharb, a translation of the Arabic malik al-mashriq wa al-maghrib [King of the East and the West]), Sultan of Rum Kaykhusraw I (as Padishah of Islam), and Sultan of Rum Kayqubad I (as pādshāh).
- Mongol Ilkhan Ghazan took the title Padshah-i Islam after he converted to Islam in 1295, possibly in order to undermine the religious prestige of the Mamluk Sultanate in Egypt. The title Ilkhan, that came into use c. 1259–1265, may be an equivalent of Padishah, if it is taken to mean 'sovereign khan' (and not 'subordinate khan' as often posited).
- Miangul Golshahzada Abdul Wadud (predecessor styled Amir-i Shariat, successors [Khān and] Wali) of the Pakistani North-West Frontier State of Swat, who called himself badshah from November 1918 to March 1926.
- Ahmad Shah Durrani, who founded the Durrani Empire in 1747 with the title Pādshah-i Afghanistan in Persian and Badcha Da Afghanistan in the Pashto language. The Sadduzai were overthrown in 1823 but there was a brief restoration by Shah Shujah in 1839 with the help of British India. The title became dormant from his assassination in 1842 until 1926 when Amanullah Khan resurrected it (official from 1937) and was finally abandoned with the abdication of Mohammed Zahir Shah in 1973 following a coup; at other times the Afghan monarchy used the style Emir (Amir al-Momenin) or Malik ('King').
- The last Basha bey of Tunisia, Muhammad VIII al-Amin (proclaimed bey on 15 May 1943), adopted the sovereign style padshah 20 March 1956 – 25 July 1957.
- The female monarch Razia of the Delhi Sultanate used the masculine title padshah.

The compound Pādshah-i-Ghazi ('Victorious Emperor') is only recorded for two individual rulers:

1. Ahmad Shah Durrani, Emperor of the Durrani Empire (r. 1747–1772)
2. Rustam-i-Dauran, Aristu-i-Zaman, Asaf Jah IV, Muzaffar ul-Mamaluk, Nizam ul-Mulk, Nizam ud-Daula, Nawab Mir Farkhunda 'Ali Khan Bahadur [Gufran Manzil], Sipah Salar, Fath Jang, Ayn waffadar Fidvi-i-Senliena, Iqtidar-i-Kishwarsitan Muhammad Akbar Shah Padshah-i-Ghazi, Nizam of Hyderabad (r. 1829–1857)
- The Sikhs use the term Padishah for God and the 10 gurus. Padishah is also used for the 10th and last Guru of Sikhs Guru Gobind Singh.

Like many titles, the word Padishah was also often used as a name, either by nobles with other (in this case always lower) styles, or even by commoners.

Padshah Begum is the title of consorts of padishahs.

== Ottoman Empire ==
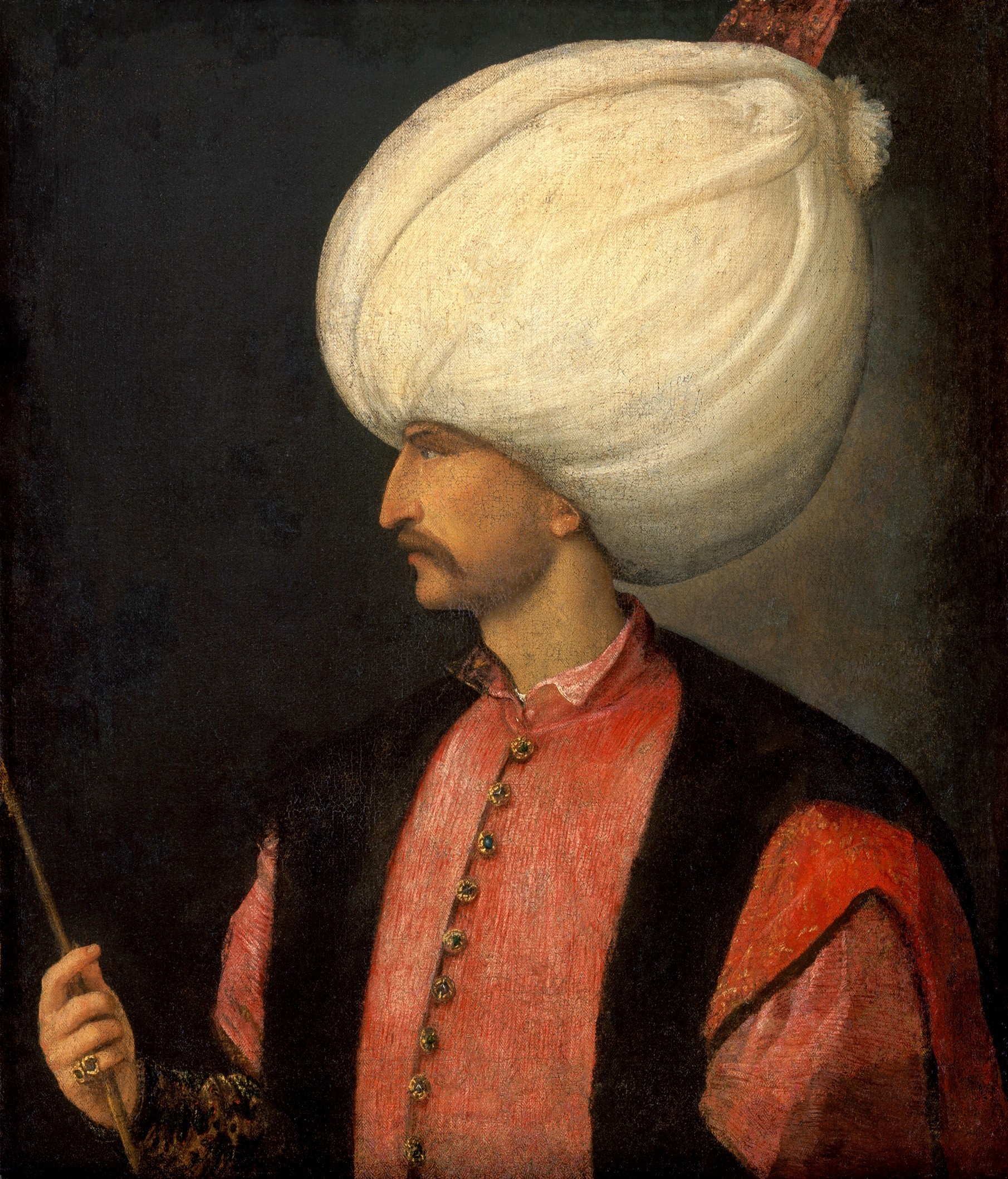
Suleiman the Magnificent, longest reigning padishah of the Ottoman Empire. Portrait attributed to Titian c. 1530.

In the Ottoman Empire the title padishah was exclusively reserved for the Ottoman emperor, as the Ottoman chancery rarely and unwillingly addressed foreign monarchs as padishahs. The Habsburg emperors were consequently denied this title and addressed merely as the "kings of Vienna" (beç kıralı). With the Peace of Zsitvatorok in 1606, it was the first time that the Sublime Porte recognized Rudolf II as equal of the padishah. The Treaty of Küçük Kaynarca in 1774, gave similar concessions to the Russian Empire.

=== In Ottoman sources ===
According to Ahmedi's İskendernâme, one of the earliest Ottoman sources, alongside the titles sultan and beg, Orhan and Murad I bore the title padishah as well.

== In popular culture ==
The title of Baadshah of Bollywood is bestowed upon Shah Rukh Khan, an Indian actor and film producer renowned for his contributions and legacies in the Hindi cinema. (Note: Attributed to multiple sources)
