= Haft Awrang =

15th century Persian literary work

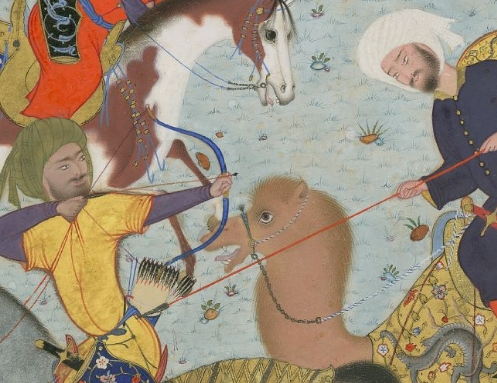
Illustration from Chain of Gold

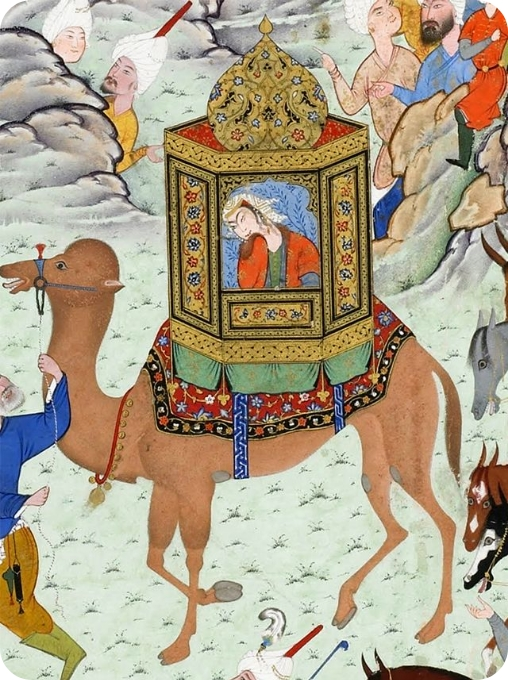
Zulaykha Enters the Capital of Egypt

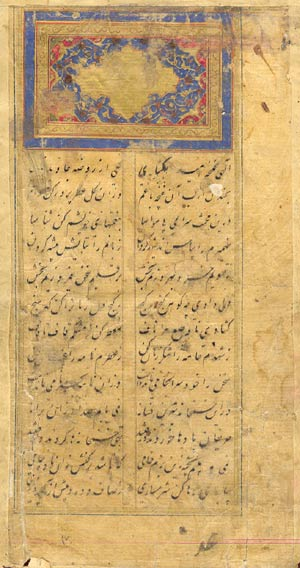
Yousof-o Zoleikha

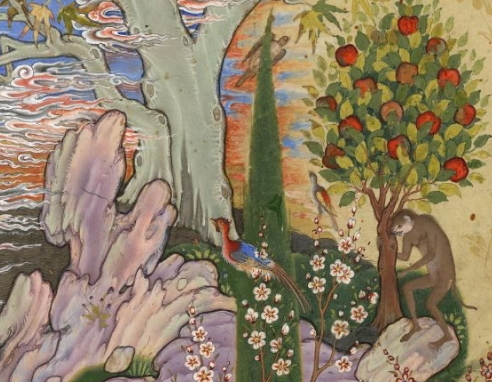
Illustration from Salaman and Absal

Haft Awrang (Persian: هفت اورنگ, meaning "Seven Thrones") by the Persian poet Jami is a classic of Persian literature composed some time between 1468 and 1485. Jami completed the work as seven books following a masnavi format:

- "Selselat adh-dhahab" (سلسلة الذهب, "Chain of Gold"): a collection of didactic anecdotes
- "Yusof-o Zulaikhā" (یوسف و زلیخا, "Joseph and Zulaikha"): the romance of Joseph and Zulaikha, wife of Potiphar based on the Islamic traditions.
- "Sabhat al-abrār" (سبحة الابرار, "Rosary of the Pious"): another collection of didactic anecdotes
- "Salaman-o Absāl" (سلامان و ابسال, Salaman and Absal): A doomed romance between a prince and his nursemaid. The original story is Greek, translated in the early Islamic times to Arabic by Ibn Hunain and then rendered into Persian poem by Jami. Dehkhoda suggests this story might have an Israelite origin.
- "Tohfat ol-ahrār (تحفة الاحرار, "Gift of the Free")
- "Layli-o Majnun" (لیلی و مجنون, "Layla and Majnun")
- "Kherad-nâme-ye Eskandari" (خردنامهٔ اسکندری, "Alexander's Book of Wisdom") account of events leading up to Alexander's death.

The term Haft Awrang itself is a reference to the seven stars that form the Big Dipper (the Plough or دب اکبر).

Religion, philosophy, and ethics of Sufi origin lie at the root of all seven masnavis.

== Freer Jami ==
Between 1556 and 1565, while he was governing Mashhad, Prince Sultan Ibrahim Mirza, nephew and son-in-law of Shah Tahmasp I, commissioned his own atelier of painters and calligraphers to create a sumptuous illustrated version of the Haft Awrang, producing one of the undoubted masterpieces of the Persian miniature, now in the Freer Gallery of Art, and known as the Freer Jami.

=== History of the Freer Jami manuscript ===
The manuscript's journey can be traced across the centuries and several empires through official seal stampings on its pages and variations in materials and styles particular to certain periods and locations throughout the Persia, India, and Europe.

Ibrahim Mirza may have originally commissioned the manuscript's creation to celebrate the wedding of Shah Tahmasp I. The romantic and philosophical themes of Jami's seven masnavis would have been appropriate as a gift to a recently married man. At least five calligraphers contributed to the manuscript's creation: Shah Mahmud Nishapuri, Rustam 'Ali, Muhibb 'Ali, Malik al-Daylami, and Ayshi ibn Ishrati. It was also transcribed in three different cities: Mashhad, Qazvin, and Herat. Once the individual contributions were brought together and assembled, further decoration was added. The manuscript includes copious illuminations throughout the seven poems, including 28 full-page paintings featuring complex arrangements of detailed architectural settings and idealized figures.

The first indication of transfer can be found on a page with multiple seal impressions indicating that around 1609, the Safavid Shah Abbas the Great donated the manuscript to the dynastic shrine at Ardabil.

Around the mid-seventeenth century, the manuscript found its way to the Mughal Empire in India. A page with inspection notes and more seal impressions was added to the end folio which references Shah Jahan I (r. 1628–1658) and his successor Awrangzib (r.1658–1707).

Scholars believe it travelled back to the region which is now Iran by the late eighteenth or nineteenth century, as the first folio exhibits illumination in the Qajar style (1785–1906). It most likely acquired its current decorated 'lacquer' covers and red leather spine in Europe after that. The next verified step in the manuscript's journey is in a sale catalog from 1926 Milan, Italy, where archaeologist and collector, Hagop Kevorkian acquired it. The Smithsonian Institution purchased the manuscript from him in 1946. It remains in the Washington D.C. Freer Gallery. All of the manuscript's pages can be viewed in the Smithsonian Institution's online database.

== See also ==
- Sadd-i Iskandari
