= Alexander the Great in Islamic tradition =

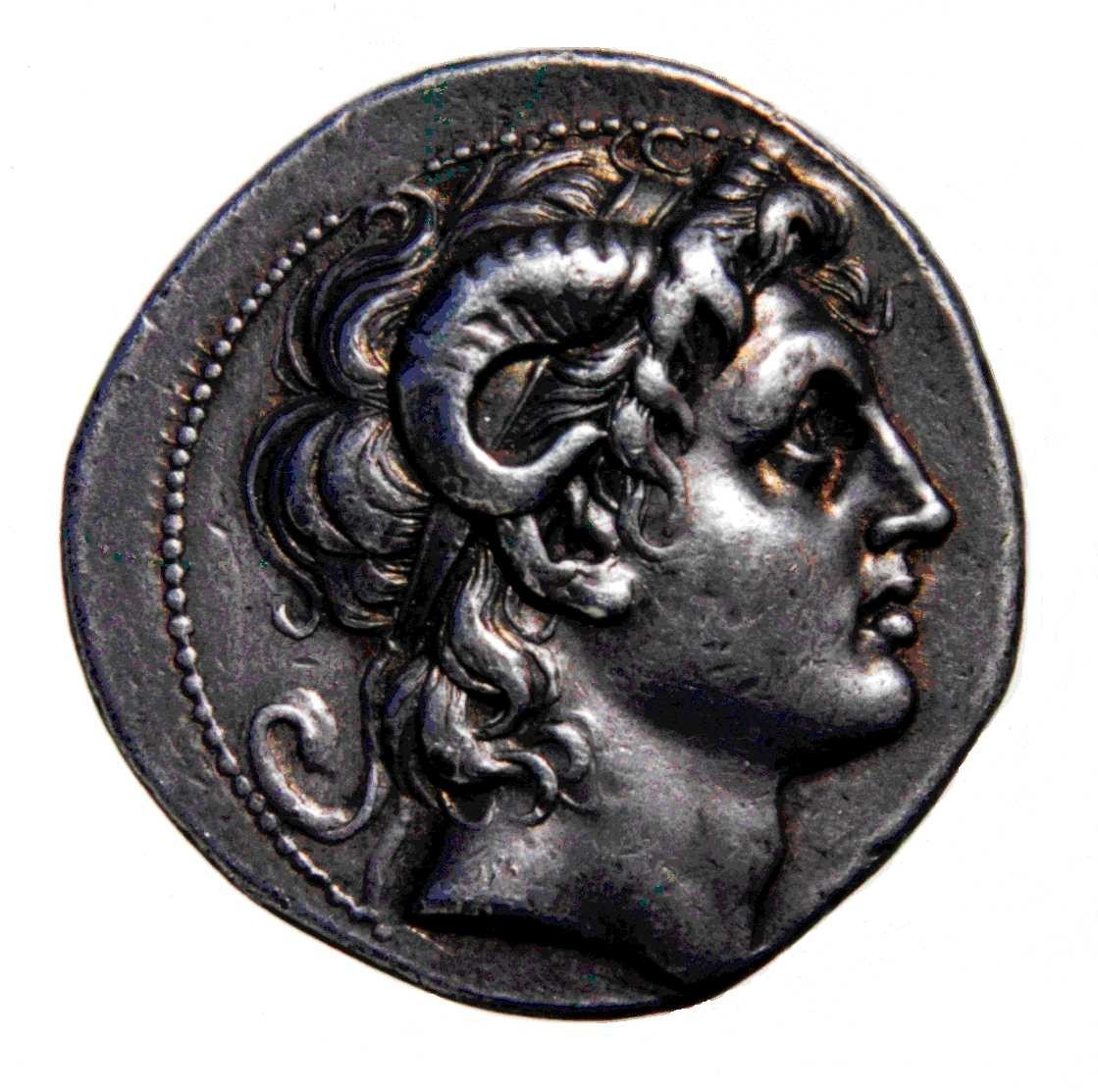
Silver tetradrachm of Alexander the Great shown wearing the horns of the ram-god Zeus-Ammon.

Alexander the Great was a king of ancient Greece and Macedon who forged one of the largest empires in world history. Soon after his death, a body of legend began to accumulate about his life and exploits. With the Greek Alexander Romance and its translation into numerous languages including Armenian, Syriac, Arabic, Persian, Ethiopic, and more, an entire genre of literature was dedicated to the exploits of Alexander in both Christian and Muslim realms. Alexander was also the one most frequently identified with Dhu'l-Qarnayn (Arabic: ذو القرنين, lit. 'the Two-Horned One'), a figure that appears in Surah al-Kahf in the Quran, the holy text of Islam, which greatly expanded the attention paid to him in the traditions of the Muslim world.

== Arabic tradition ==
Most Islamic exegetes and commentators have identified the Quranic figure of Dhu'l-Qarnayn (lit. 'the Two-Horned One') with Alexander the Great. Following this, Alexander would quickly feature prominently in early Arabic literature often as Alexander, and his name would be closely tied with the Two-Horned title. There are many surviving versions of the Alexander Romance in Arabic that were written after the conquest of Islam. It is also thought that pre-Islamic Arabic versions of the Alexander Romance may have existed.

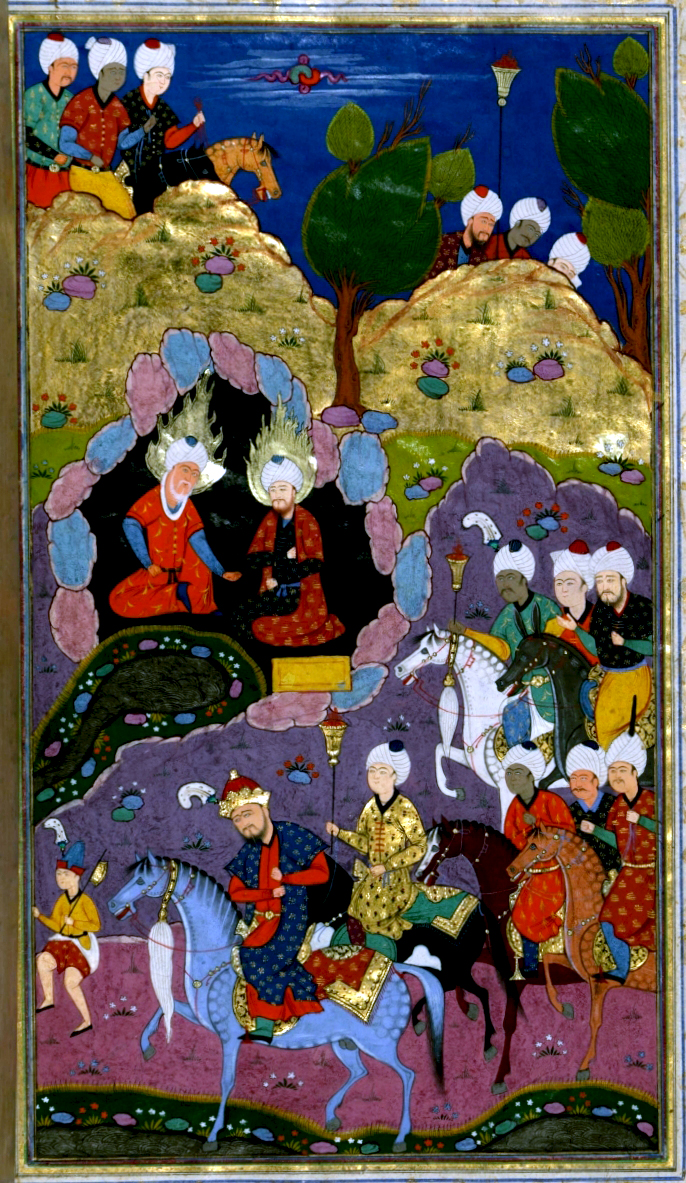
Alexander visits Ilyas and Khidr at the fountain of youth

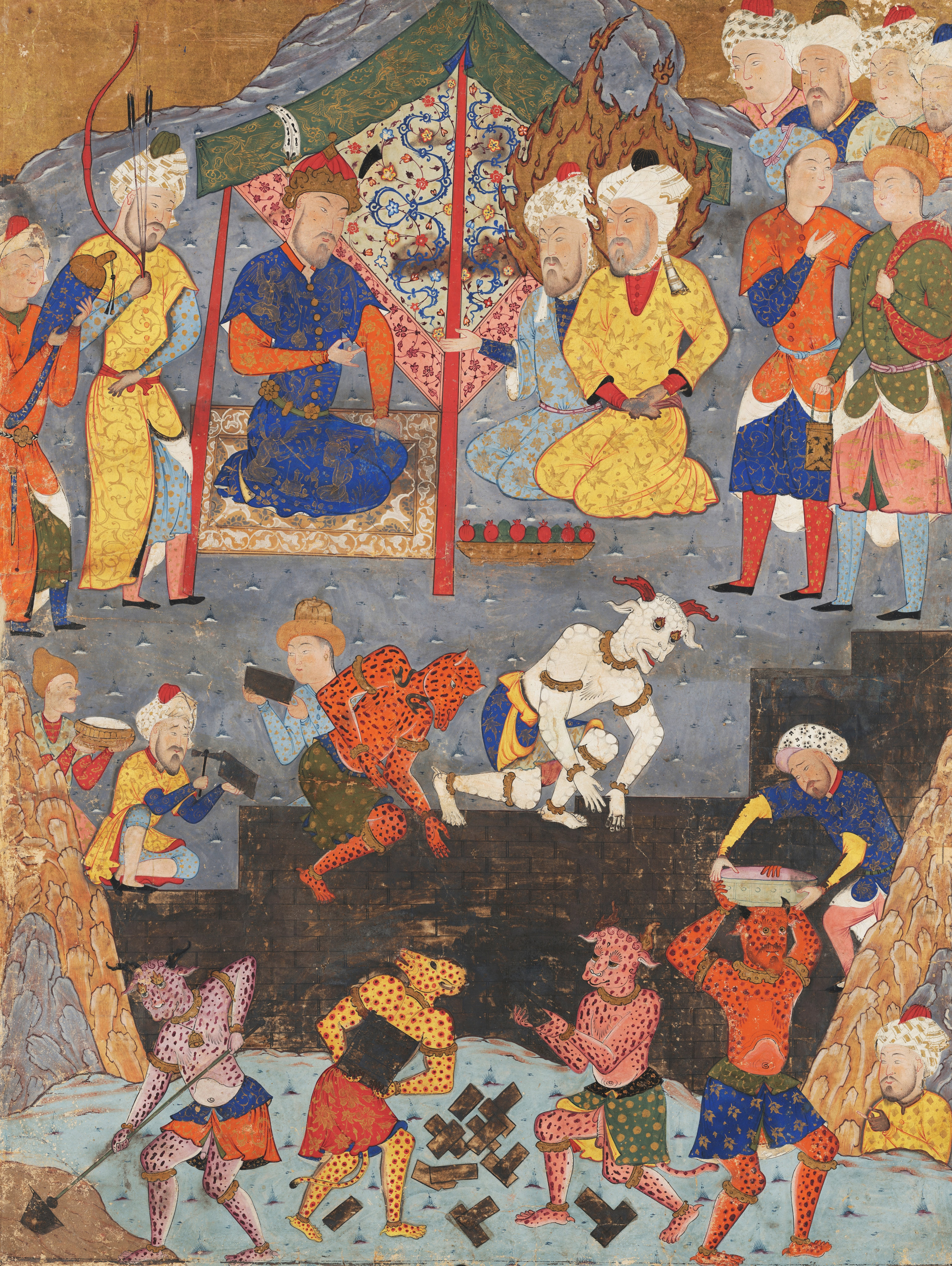
Alexander builds a wall against Gog and Magog

The earliest surviving Arabic narrative of the Alexander Romance, the Qissat al-Iskandar, was composed by Umara ibn Zayd (767–815 AD). In the tale, Alexander the Great travels a great deal, builds the Wall against Gog and Magog, searches for the Water of Life (Fountain of Youth), and encounters angels who give him a "wonder-stone" that both weighs more than any other stone but is also as light as dust. This wonder-stone is meant to admonish Alexander for his ambitions and indicate that his lust for conquest and eternal life will not end until his death. The story of the wonder-stone is not found in the Syriac Christian legend, but is found in Jewish Talmudic traditions about Alexander as well as in Persian traditions.

A South Arabian Alexander legend is attributed to the Yemenite traditionist Wahb ibn Munabbih (650–732 AD) in a book by Ibn Hisham (?–833 AD) regarding the history of the Himyarite Kingdom in ancient Yemen. In the Yemenite variation, Dhu al-Qarnayn is identified with an ancient king of Yemen named Sa'b Dhu Marathid, rather than Alexander the Great, but the Arabic story still describes the story of Alexander's Wall against Gog and Magog and his quest for the Water of Life. The story also mentions that Dhu al-Qarnayn visited a castle with glass walls and visited the Brahmins of India. The South Arabian legend was composed within the context of the division between the South Arabs and North Arabs that began with the Battle of Marj Rahit in 684 AD and consolidated over two centuries.

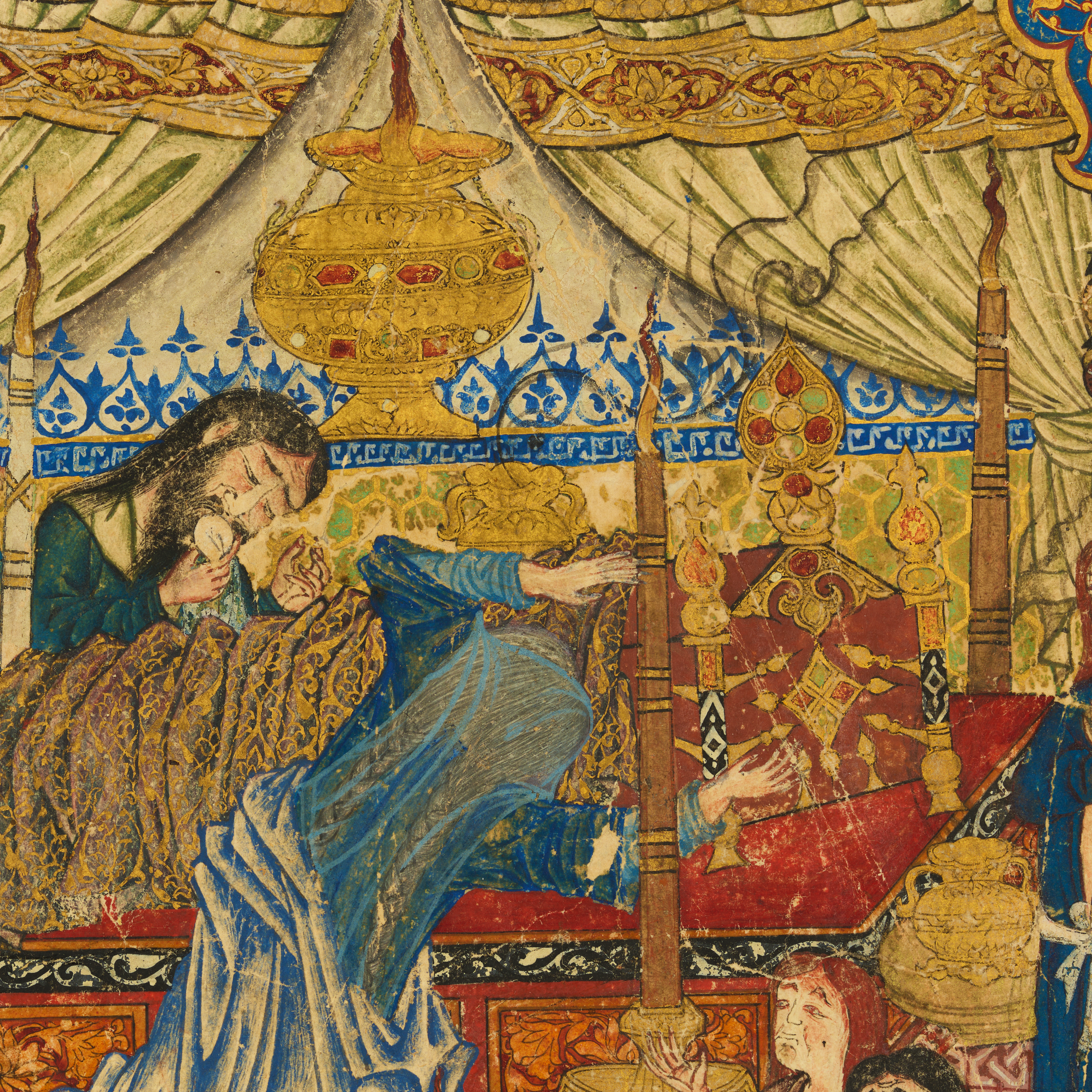
14th century Islamic illustration of Aristotle weeping into a handkerchief at Iskander's bier, while Olympias hugs her son's coffin

The Alexander Romance also had an important influence on Arabic wisdom literature. In Secretum Secretorum ("Secret of Secrets", in Arabic Kitab sirr al-asrar), an encyclopedic Arabic treatise on a wide range of topics such as statecraft, ethics, physiognomy, alchemy, astrology, magic and medicine, Alexander appears as a speaker and subject of wise sayings and as a correspondent with figures such as Aristotle. The origins of the treatise are uncertain. No Greek original exists, though there are claims in the Arabic treatise that it was translated from the Greek into Syriac and from Syriac into Arabic by a well-known 9th century translator, Yahya ibn al-Bitriq (?–815 AD). It appears, however, that the treatise was actually composed originally in Arabic.

In another example of Arabic wisdom literature relating to Alexander, Ibn al-Nadim (932–997 AD) refers to a work on divination titled The Drawing of Lots by Dhu al-Qarnayn and to a second work on divination by arrows titled The Gift of Alexander, but only the titles of these works have survived.

Notably, the Abbasid caliph al-Mu'tasim (794–842 AD) had ordered the translation of the Thesaurus Alexandri, a work on elixirs and amulets, from Greek and Latin into Arabic. The Greek work Thesaurus Alexandri was attributed to Hermes (the great messenger of the gods in Greek mythology) and similarly contained supposed letters from Aristotle addressed to Alexander.

Another piece of Arabic Alexander literature is the Laments (or Sayings) of the Philosophers. These are a collection of remarks supposedly made by some philosophers gathered at the tomb of Alexander after his death. This legend was originally written in the 6th century in Syriac and was later translated into Arabic and expanded upon. The Laments of the Philosophers eventually gained enormous popularity in Europe.

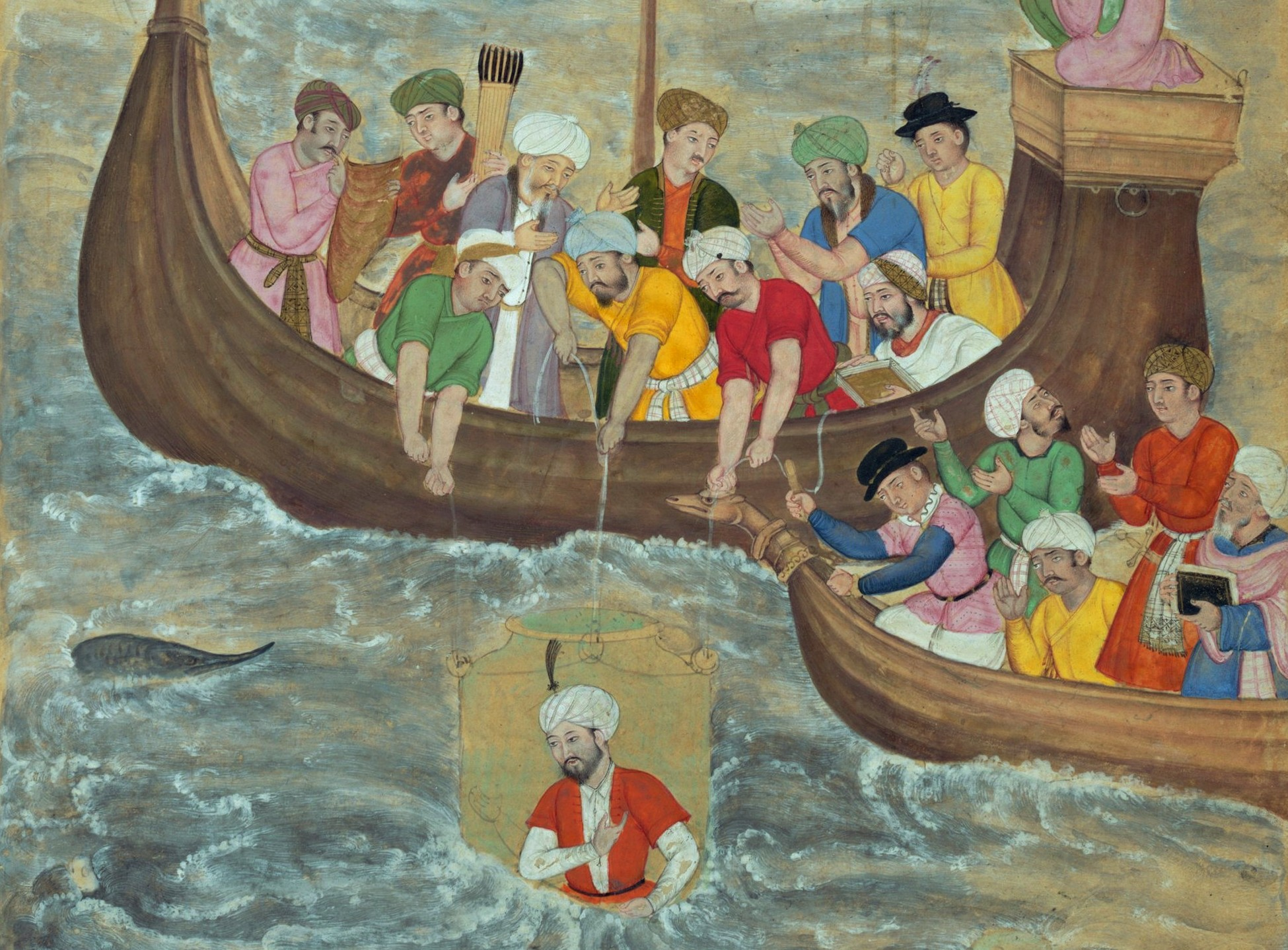
Detail of a 16th-century Islamic painting depicting Alexander being lowered in a glass submersible

The Sīrat al-Iskandar (Life of Alexander) is a 13th-century popular Arabic-language romance about Alexander the Great. It belongs to the sīra shaʿbiyya genre. In the Sīrat, Alexander is a son of Dārāb, a prince of the Achaemenid dynasty of Persia, and Nāhīd, daughter of King Philip II of Macedon. He is born in secret at Philip's court and is raised by Aristotle. He eventually succeeds Philip as king, while his half-brother Dārā succeeds to the Persian throne. They go to war and Alexander is victorious, with Dārā dying in his arms. After returning to Macedon, Alexander comes under the influence of the devil, Iblīs, until he is brought back to the right path by al-Khiḍr, who convinces him he has a divine mission: to convert the whole world to monotheism. The two travel first to the West and then to the East, converting people everywhere they go. Alexander then constructs the famous wall confining Gog and Magog before setting out for the Land of Darkness to find the Water of Life. He is prevented from reaching the water by the Isrāfīl (angels), who instead give him the wonderstone. Shortly after, Alexander writes a letter of consolation to his mother and dies. He is buried in Alexandria.

== Persian tradition ==
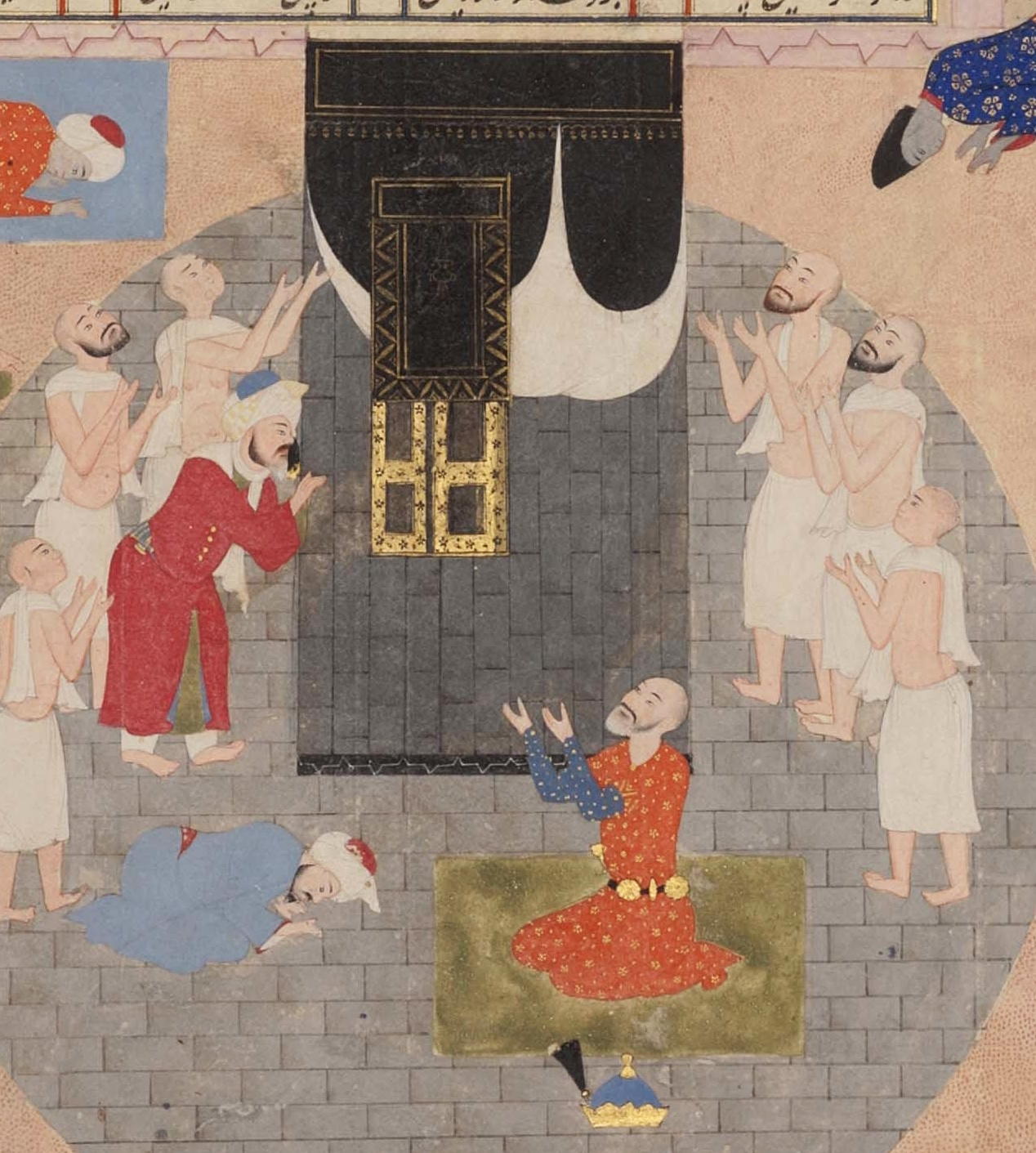
Folio from the Shahnameh showing Alexander praying at the Kaaba, mid-16th century

With the Muslim conquest of Persia in 644 AD, the Alexander Romance found its way into Persian literature—an ironic outcome considering pre-Islamic Persia's hostility towards the national enemy who conquered the Achaemenid Empire and was directly responsible for Persian domination by Hellenistic foreign rulers. However, he is not depicted as a warrior and conqueror, but as a seeker of truth who eventually finds the Ab-i Hayat (Water of Life). Islamic Persian accounts of the Alexander legend, frequently titled Iskandarnama ("Book of Alexander", such as an anonymous eleventh-century Iskandarnama and the Iskandarnama of Nizami), combined the Pseudo-Callisthenes material about Alexander, some of which is found in the Quran, with indigenous Sasanian Middle Persian ideas about Alexander. For example, Pseudo-Callisthenes is the source of many incidents in the Shahnama written by Ferdowsi (935–1020 AD) in New Persian. Persian sources on the Alexander legend devised a mythical genealogy for him whereby his mother was a concubine of Darius II, making him the half-brother of the last Achaemenid shah, Darius. By the 12th century such important Persian writers as Nizami Ganjavi (from Ganja in modern-day Republic of Azerbaijan) were making him the subject of their epic poems. Another significant version was the 13th-century Ayina-i Iskandari (Alexandrine Mirror) of Amir Khusrau and the 15th-century Kherad-nâme (Book of Alexandrian Intelligence) of Jâmi.

The Muslim traditions also elaborated the legend that Alexander the Great had been the companion of Aristotle and the direct student of Plato.

== Andalusian tradition ==
After the Umayyad Muslim conquest of Spain (al-Andalus) in 711 AD, Muslim literature flourished under the Caliphate of Córdoba (929 to 1031 AD). An Arabic derivative of the Alexander Romance was produced, called the Qissat Dhulqarnayn (Tales of Dhul-Qarnayn). The material was later incorporated into Qisas Al-Anbiya (Tales of the Prophets):

By the turn of the first millennium C.E., the romance of Alexander in Arabic had a core centered on the Greek legendary material ... Interwoven later into this narrative in the Tales of the Prophets literature were episodes of an apparent Arab-Islamic elaboration: the construction of a great barrier to keep the people of Gog and Magog from harassing the people of the civilized world until Judgement Day, the voyage to the end of the Earth to witness the sun set in a pool of boiling mud, and Dhu al-Qarnayn's expedition into the Land of Darkness in search of the Fountain of Life accompanied by his companion Khidir ("the Green-One").

Another Hispano-Arabic Alexander Romance was produced, called the Hadith Dhulqarnayn, also known as the Leyenda de Alejandro. By 1236 AD, the Reconquista was essentially completed and Europeans had retaken the Iberian Peninsula from the Muslims, but the Emirate of Granada, a small Muslim vassal of the Christian Kingdom of Castile, remained in Spain until 1492 AD. During the Reconquista, Muslims were forced to either convert to Catholicism or leave the peninsula. The descendants of Muslims who converted to Christianity were called the Moriscos (meaning "Moor-like") and were suspecting of secretly practicing Islam. The Moriscos used a language called Aljamiado, which was a dialect of the Spanish language (Mozarabic) but was written using the Arabic alphabet. Aljamiado played a very important role in preserving Islam and the Arabic language in the life of the Moriscos; prayers and the sayings of Muhammad were translated into Aljamiado transcriptions of the Spanish language, while keeping all Quranic verses in the original Arabic. During this period, a version of the Alexander legend was written in the Aljamaido language, building on the Arabic Qisas Dhul-Qarnayn legends as well as Romance language versions of the Alexander Romance.

== Central Asian tradition ==
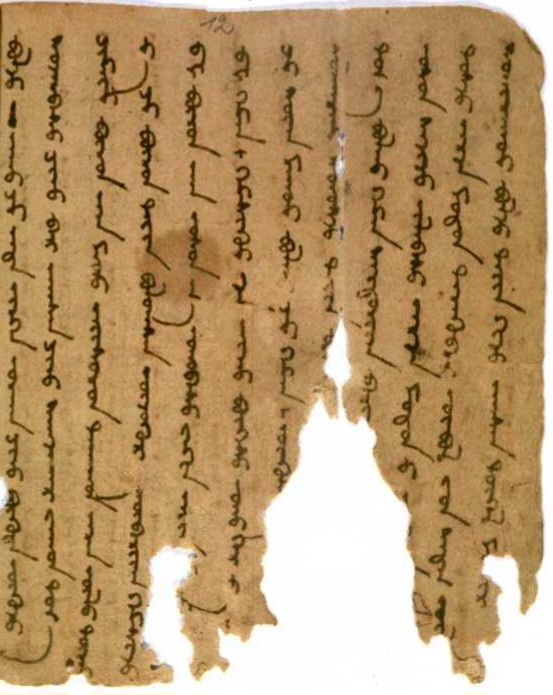
A fragment of a 14th-century Middle Mongolian manuscript of the Alexander Romance, produced in the Chagatai Khanate. In this version, Alexander is called Sulqarnai, a Mongolianized form of the Qur’anic term Dhu al-Qarnayn.

Certain Muslim people of Central Asia, specifically Bulgar, Tatar and Bashkir peoples of the Volga-Ural region (within what is today Tatarstan in the Russian Federation), carried on a rich tradition of the Alexander legend well into the 19th century. The region was conquered by the Abbasid Caliphate in the early 10th century. In these legends, Alexander is referred to as Iskandar Dhul-Qarnayn (Alexander the Two Horned), and is "depicted as founder of local cities and an ancestor of local figures." The local folklore about Iskandar Dhul-Qarnayn played in an important role in communal identity:

The conversion of the Volga Bulghars to Islam is commonly dated to the first decades of the 10th century, and by the middle of the 12th century, it is apparent that Islamic historical figures and Islamic forms of communal validation had become important factors for Bulghar communal and political cohesion. The Andalusian traveler Abū Hamid al-Gharnāti who visited Bulghar in the 1150s, noted that Iskandar Dhūl-Qarnayn passed through Bulghar, that is, the Volga-Kama region, on his way to build the iron walls that contained Yā'jūj and Mā'jūj [Gog and Magog] within the land of darkness ... while Najib al-Hamadāni reports that the rulers of Bulghar claimed descent from Iskandar Dhūl-Qarnayn.

The Iskandar Dhul-Qanryan legends played an important role in the conversion narrative of the Volga Bulgar Muslims:

There are numerous digressions dealing with the founding of the Bulghar conversion narrative, and legends concerning Iskandar Dhūl-Qarnayn [Alexander Dhul-Qarnayn] and Socrates. According to the account, Socrates was born a Christian in Samarqand and went to Greece to serve Iskandar Dhūl-Qarnayn (Iskandar Rūmi). Together, they went to the Land of Darkness (diyār-i zulmat) to seek the Fountain of Youth (āb-i hayāt). In the northern lands they built a city and called it Bulghar.

In 1577 AD the Tsardom of Russia annexed control of the region and Bulgar Muslim writings concerning Dhul-Qarnayn do not appear again until the 18th and 19th centuries, which saw a resurgence of local Iskandar Dhul-Qarnayn legends as a source of Muslim and ethnic identity:

It was only at the turn of the 18th and 19th centuries that we begin to see historical legends concerning Iskandar Dhūl-Qarnayn reemerge among Volga-Kama Muslims, at least in written form, and it was not until the 19th century that such legends were recorded from local Muslim oral tradition. In one of his earliest historical works, entitled Ghilālat al-Zamān and written in 1877 the Tatar theologian, Shihāb al-Dīn Marjānī wrote that according to Arabic and other Muslim writings, as well as according to popular legends, the city of Bulghar was founded by Alexander the Great.

== Malaysian tradition ==
The Hikayat Iskandar Zulkarnain ("Romance of Alexander the Two-Horned") is a Malay epic describing fictional exploits of Alexander the Great (Iskandar), identified in the story with Dhu al-Qarnayn. The oldest existing manuscript is dated 1713, but is in a poor state. Another manuscript was copied by Muhammad Cing Sa'idullah about 1830. Iskandar Zulkarnain is claimed to be a direct antecedent of the Minangkabau kingdoms of Sumatra by their rulers. The best known Minangkabau ruler, Adityavarman, who ruled over Sumatra between 1347 and 1374 AD claimed for himself the name Maharajadiraja, 'a great lord of kings.' It was William Marsten who first publicized this link at the end of the 18th century. The descent from Iskandar Zulkarnain, is claimed via Raja Rajendra Chola (Raja Chulan, Raja Cholan) in the Malay Annals. There is a "Sumatran version" of the narrative. Its most likely source is the Arabic Sīrat al-Iskandar.

== Reception in non-Islamic texts ==
Commentary on the figure of Dhu al-Qarnayn by Christians is found in glosses on the Quran. For example, glosses on Quran 18:83–102 in Latin translations of the Quran demonstrates an unambiguous familiarity among Christian commenters that the passage they were reading was a story about the two-horned Alexander the Great.
