= Kashef Shirazi =

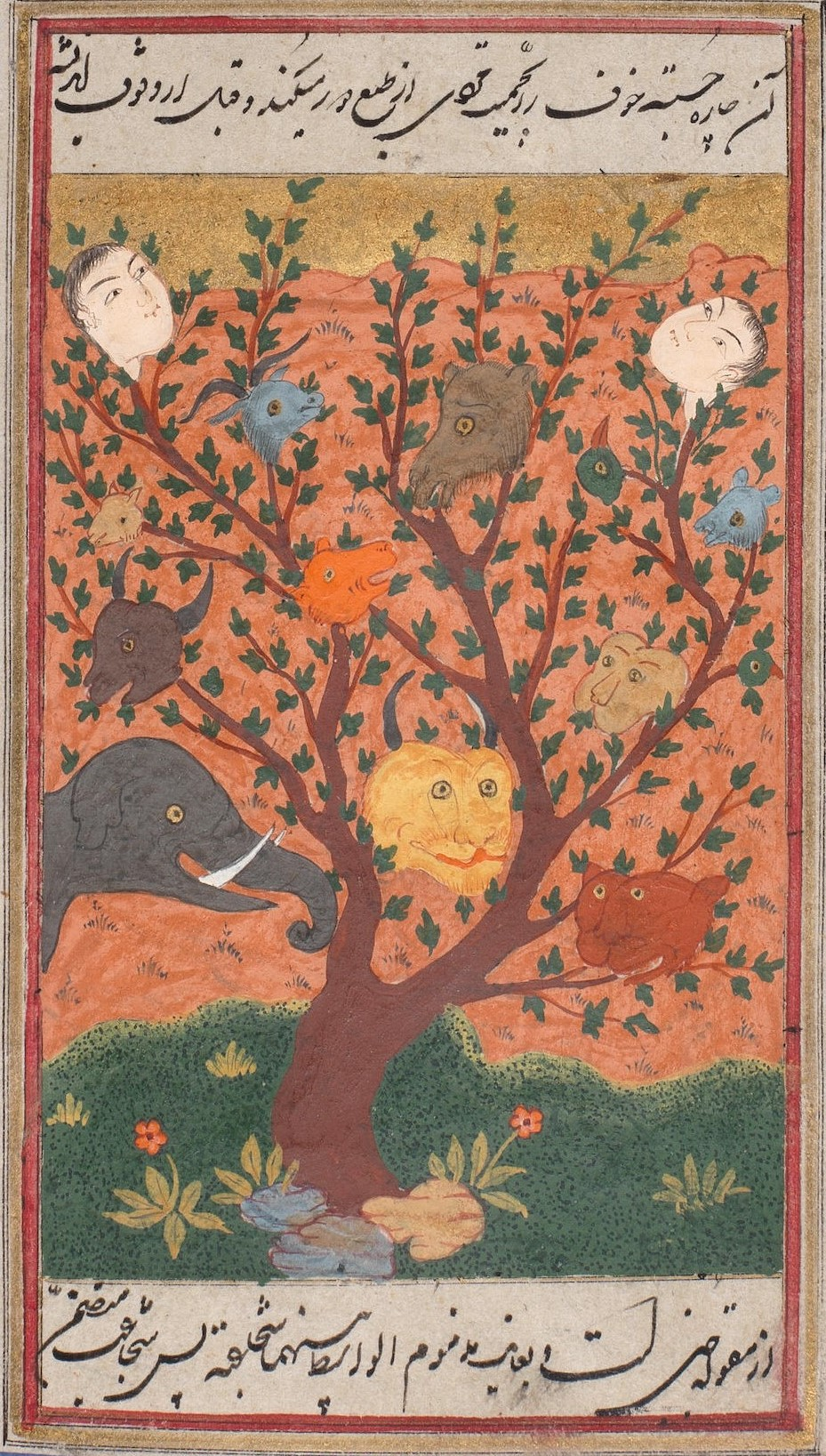
- Illustration from a page in a copy of the Seraj al-monir by Kashef Shirazi. Created in Qajar Iran, dated 15 February 1815
- Born: c. 1592; Karbala, Ottoman Empire
- Died: c. 1653; Ray, Safavid Iran
- Occupation: Writer
- Relatives: Esmail Monshef (brother); Moqima (brother)
- Writing career
- Language: Persian
- Notable works: Seraj al-monir Khazan o bahar

Kashef Shirazi (Persian: کاشف شیرازی: c. 1592–1653) was a writer in Safavid Iran, who composed works about ethics and poetry.

Kashef was born in Karbala, where his family had moved from Iran. He was the son of a certain Shamsa of Shiraz, an account keeper. Kashef's family moved back when he was still a child, settling in Isfahan. Kashef committed himself to writing and learning a variety of academic subjects for twenty three years, including logic, theology, and Arabic grammar. Like him, his brothers, Esmail Monshef and Moqima, were also prominent poets. Kashef later served as a judge for fifteen years in Ray, where he died. One of his written works, Khazan o bahar, has an autobiographical note in the final chapter.

Kashef wrote under the pen-names Kashef, Kashef-e Komeyt and Sharifa Kashef. Two of his best-known works are his prose writings, Seraj al-monir and Khazan o bahar, which have numerous passages with poems based on the Golestan by Saadi Shirazi.

== Sources ==
- de Bruijn, J. T . P. (2020). "Kāšef Širāzi". Encyclopaedia Iranica Online. Brill. doi:10.1163/2330-4804_EIRO_COM_10871.
