= Persian literature in Western culture =

The influence of Persian literature in Western culture is historically significant. In order to avoid what E.G. Browne calls "an altogether inadequate judgment of the intellectual activity of that ingenious and talented people" (E.G.Browne, p4), many centers of academia throughout the world today from Berlin to Japan have permanent programs for Persian studies for the literary heritage of Persia.

The late L.P. Elwell-Sutton, "distinguished professor" of Persian studies of The University of Edinburgh calls Persian poetry "one of the richest poetic literatures of the world".

== Ancient Persian literature ==
The study of Avestic and ancient Persian literature in the west began in the 18th century with scholars investigating Zoroastrian texts brought in from Bombay, India. It was the Frenchman Anquetil Duperron who first translated the Vendidad in 1759, followed by works of Sir William Jones and Sylvestre de Sacy, who worked on Pahlavi texts. The decipherment of the ancient cuneiform inscriptions came in the 19th century, with the translation of the Behistun Inscription in 1847 by Sir Henry Rawlinson, building on earlier work by Georg Friedrich Grotefend, Eugène Burnouf, and Christian Lassen.

== FitzGerald ==
The magnitude of the influence of Persian literature on western literature becomes clear from the words of Christopher Decker of the University of Cambridge, who writes: "the most frequently read of Victorian poetry, and certainly one of the most popular poems in the English language" was Omar Khayyám's Rubaiyat (C. Decker). The 1953 edition of The Oxford Dictionary of Quotations contains 188 excerpts from the Rubaiyat alone, of which 59 are complete quatrains, virtually two thirds of the total work of Omar Khayyám.

Phrases like the following that are now part of the English language have their origins in the Rubaiyyat:

- '"A jug of Wine, a loaf of Bread - and Thou/beside singing in the wilderness"'
- '"Like Snow upon the Desert's dusty face"'
- '"The courts where Jamshid gloried and drank deep"'
- '"I came like Water, and like Wind I go"'
- '"The Flower that once has blown forever dies"'
- '"And that inverted Bowl we call The Sky"'
- '"The moving finger writes, and having writ, moves on..."'

In the words of Dick Davis, Edward FitzGerald found the "twin soul" he had spent most of his life seeking in Khayyam.

== Goethe ==
The encounter of Johann Wolfgang von Goethe with Hafiz's ghazals became so inspiring to Goethe, that he produced his own West-östlicher Diwan and "led the way to the discovery of Persian poetry by the Romantics", according to Shusha Guppy.

His west-ostlicher, and collection of poetry in general, gradually came to function as "an influential model for religious and literary syntheses between the ‘occident’ and the ‘orient’ in the 19th century", according to Jeffrey Einboden of Magdalene College in Cambridge, England.

== Emerson and Nietzsche ==
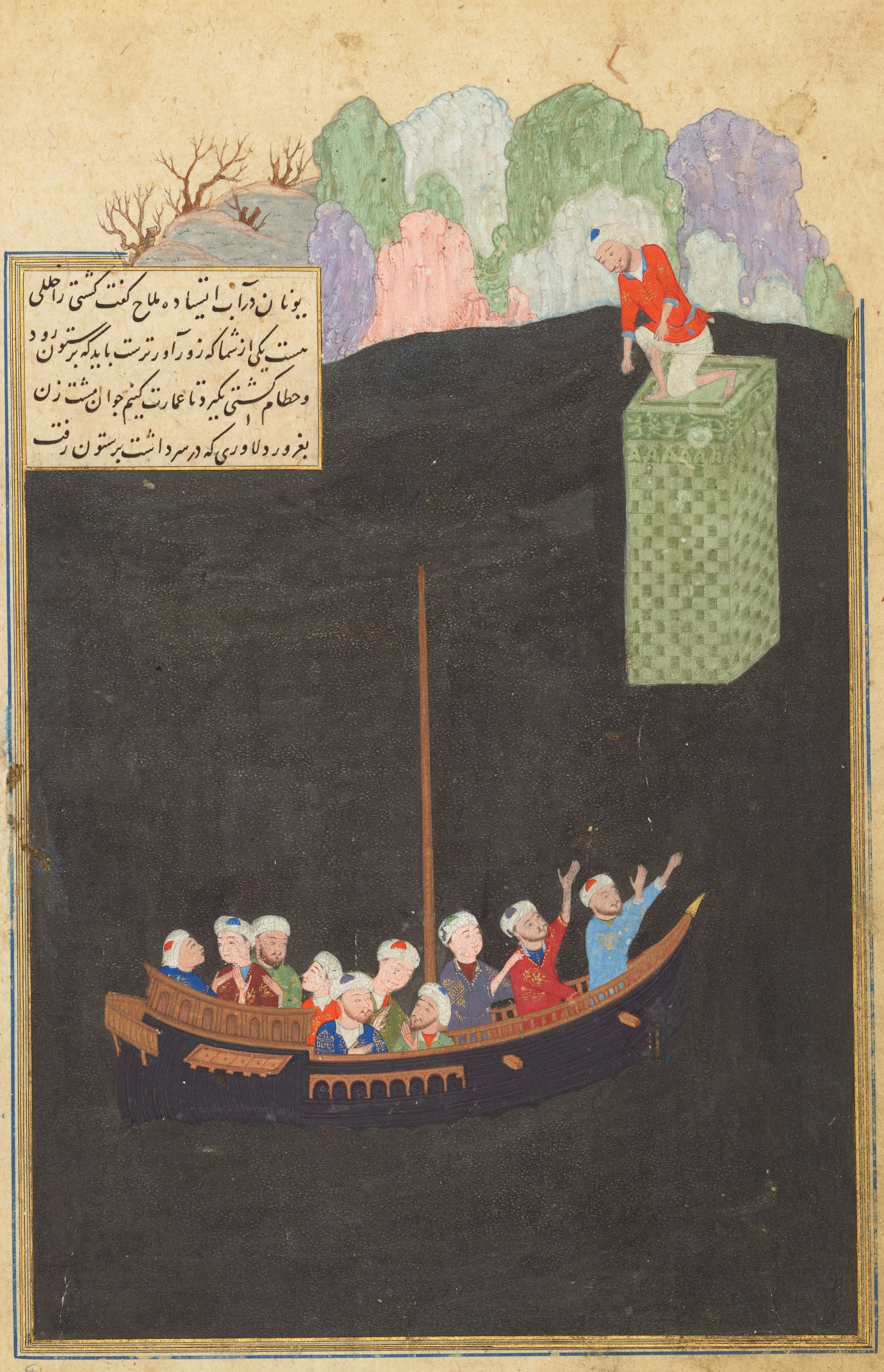
The Gulistan of Sa'di

Ralph Waldo Emerson was another admirer of Persian poetry. In his essays "Persian poetry" (1876, Letters and Social Aims), "From the Persian of Hafiz", and "Ghaselle", Emerson expressed admiration for Persian poetry, and through these writings became instrumental in creating a new genre of audiences for the unique qualities of Persian verse. "The excitement [the poems] produced exceeds that of the grape" he wrote. In his interest in Persian poets and poetry, one can glimpse a Dionysian side of Emerson, the side that appealed to Friedrich Nietzsche. Emerson, who read Sa'di only in translation, compared his writing to the Bible in terms of its wisdom and the beauty of its narrative.

Friedrich Nietzsche, a radical opposer of Greek Metaphysical thought, was the author of the book Thus Spoke Zarathustra, referring to the ancient Persian prophet Zoroaster, as the prophet of his philosophy.

Nietzsche held very high interest and respect for Persians. For example, where he speaks about the Persian notion of history and cyclical Eternal Time, he writes: "I must pay tribute to Zarathustra, a Persian: Persians were the first to have conceived of History in its full extent." and further adds: "It would have been much more fortunate had the Persians become masters (Herr) of the Greeks, rather than have the Romans of all people assume that role."

But Nietzsche was also influenced by Persia's post-Islamic writers as well. In his notebooks, Nietzsche uses an anecdote from Sa'di's Gulistan. La Fontaine also drew from Sa'di's Gulistan, basing his Le songe d'un habitant du Mogol on chapter 2:16, as did Diderot, Voltaire, Hugo and Balzac, all of whom referred to Sa'di's works in their writings.

Hafiz represented to Nietzsche a prime example of Dionysian ecstatic wisdom, which he extolls so extensively in his philosophy. Goethe's admiration for Hafiz and his "Oriental" wisdom, as expressed in the West-östlischer Divan, has been the main source of attracting Nietzsche's interest in this Persian poet. There is even a short poem in Nietzsche's Collected Works, entitled An Hafis. Frage eines Wassertrinkers (To Hafiz: Questions of a Water Drinker).

== Carnot Family ==
Lazare Carnot the French politician and his family were heavily influenced by Saadi Shirazi books. Sadi Carnot the Former President of France was his grandson and Nicolas Léonard Sadi Carnot the French Engineer was his son. The name Saadi in the family comes from Saadi name.

== Rumi and the Sufist genre ==
Sufi ideas and literature gained interest in the west particularly after the first world war, beginning with non-cultist Sufis like Henry Wilberforce-Clarke and Sir Richard Burton, as well as scholars such as Maurice Nicholl, Kenneth Walker, and philosophers Gurdjieff and Ouspensky. Writings of Attar, Jami, Hafiz, Shabistari, and Rumi came to influence a whole generation of writers.

Since the beginning of 21st century, Persian poet and philosopher Rumi has appeared as the most popular poet worldwide. His works, which have been partly translated to English, attracted attention of numerous thinkers and artists.

These, and subsequent works leads one to conclude that the influence of Persian literature extends beyond what was written in the Persian language to encompass works by those who thought in Persian when it came to literature, metaphysics, and philosophy, irrespective of their native tongues and ethnic origins.

== See also ==
- Persian literature
- Pahlavi literature
- The Heroic Legend of Arslan
