= Baharestan (book) =

Book by the Persian poet Jami

Baharestan, (in Persian: بهارستان), (pronounced as Bahārestān or Bahaarestaan) (meaning the land of spring, the spring orchard or the spring garden), is a Persian book written by Jami that contains prose. It has stories, tales and moral advice mainly in prose, but also in poetry. Baharestan is divided into eight chapters, an introduction, and a final part. Each of its chapters is called a rowzeh (from Arabic rawzah, meaning paradise or heaven). In the introduction of Baharestan, Jami stated that he had written this book in the style of Saadi Shirazi's Gulistan for his son who was ten years old at the time and was studying. Baharestan has content about Sufism and mysticism. There are 469 verses of poetry in this book; 16 verses being in Arabic and the rest in Persian. Baharestan has saj' in its texts and the type of its prose is rhymed prose; i.e. it is rhythmic. Each chapter in Baharestan has a specific topic; for example, in the seventh chapter, the topic is the life and the biography of some poets.

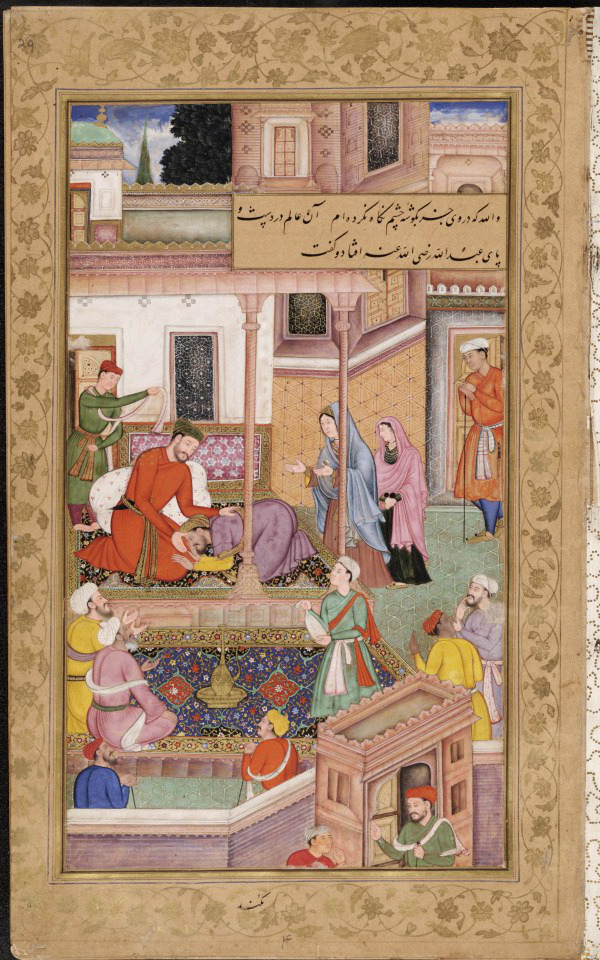
Illustration from Bahâristân, dated 1595, with two lines of included script
