= Kherad-name =

15th-century Persian literary work

The Kherad-nâme-ye Eskandari (Alexandrian Book of Wisdom) (also referred to as the Khiradnāma) of Abd-al-Rahmân Jâmi is a piece of Persian literature which existed as an heir to the tradition of the Khamsa of Nizami Ganjavi (d. 1209). It constitutes the final book of Jami's larger seven-book composition, his Haft Awrang. More specifically, it focuses on legends of Alexander the Great as recounted in Nizami's Iskandarnameh and ultimately in the tradition of the Alexander Romance genre of literature. Jami's representation of the genre offers his readers a spiritual reflection on Alexander's journeys interspersed with long philosophical meditations exemplified through short anecdotes (hekâyat). As with other Islamic authors of this era, Alexander is ultimately identified with Dhu al-Qarnayn in his construction of the eastern wall against Gog and Magog.

The text was composed before 1489, possibly in 1485, and was dedicated to the Timurid ruler of Herat (one of the cities believed to have been originally constructed by Alexander during his conquest of the Achaemenid Empire), Sultan Husayn Bayqara (r. 1469–1506). It is roughly 2,300 verses long, making it comparatively short with other Persian literature.

== Synopsis ==
Jami chose to focus on stories that reflect wisdom and its mysteries as opposed to renarrating the life and journeys of Alexander in detail, as had been done with Alexander the Great in the Shahnameh or Nizami's Alexander. Jami's anecdotal and didactic approach focuses on civil and philosophical issues, while only touching on a few major episodes of the life of Alexander, starting with his education under Aristotle and ascent to the throne, followed by a long section discussing the court philosophers including the wisdom works of Aristotle, Plato, Socrates, Hippocrates, Pythagoras, Ascelpius (which acts to substitute Vettius Valens, Apollonius, and Porphyry in Nizami's poem). Alexander's conquests from Egypt to Persia are reduced to a brief summary:

He uprooted the temples of the idols from their very foundation,

And threw Zoroaster and the Zoroastrians into flames,

He purged the earth from all religions,

Save that of the pure and pristine God (din-e yazdân-e pâk)

He built many a city in different locations,

Such as Samarqand, Marv, and Herat.

Bent on building a barrier, he headed east,

Closing the gate of sedition to the Yâjuj.

Having traversed the expanse of the earth,

From dry land he reached the ocean green.

Alexander also contributes to the progress of civilization by minting gold and silver coins, beginning the use of iron in construction and other materials, inventing the mirror (here following the Ayina-i Iskandari or Alexandrine Mirror of Amir Khusrau), performing the first space measurements, and translating Persian literature into Greek. Alexander also visits China, India, and the Blessed City. After visiting Mount Qaf, he receives an announcement of his incoming death; this becomes the subject of the last section of the poem. He ultimately dies and is buried in Alexandria (the greatest city he built in Egypt during his journeys), and lamentations are given by his mother and various sages.

== Influence ==
Jami's poem had a substantial influence on the Sadd-i Iskandarī (Alexander's Wall) of Ali-Shir Nava'i, the only Alexander legend composed in Chagatai Turkish.

== Editions ==
- A’lâkhân Afsahzâd, Naqd va bar-resi-ye âthâr va sharh-e ahvâl-e Jâmi (Tehran, 1999)
- Nur-al-Din Abd-al-Rahmân Ebn-Ahmad Jâmi Khorâsâni, Kheradnâme-ye Eskandari, in Mathnavi-ye haft owrang, ed. Mortaza Modarres-Gilâni (Tehran 1987), pp. 911–1013
- Mathnavi-ye haft owrang, ed. A’lâkhân Afsahzâd, Jâbalqâ Dâd-Alishâh, Asghar Jân fedâ, Zâher Ahrâri, Hoseyn Ahmad Tarbiyat (2 vols., Tehran 1999), II, pp. 415–529

== See also ==
- Alexander the Great in Islamic tradition
- Qissat al-Iskandar
