= Iskendername =

Earliest surviving work of Ottoman historiography

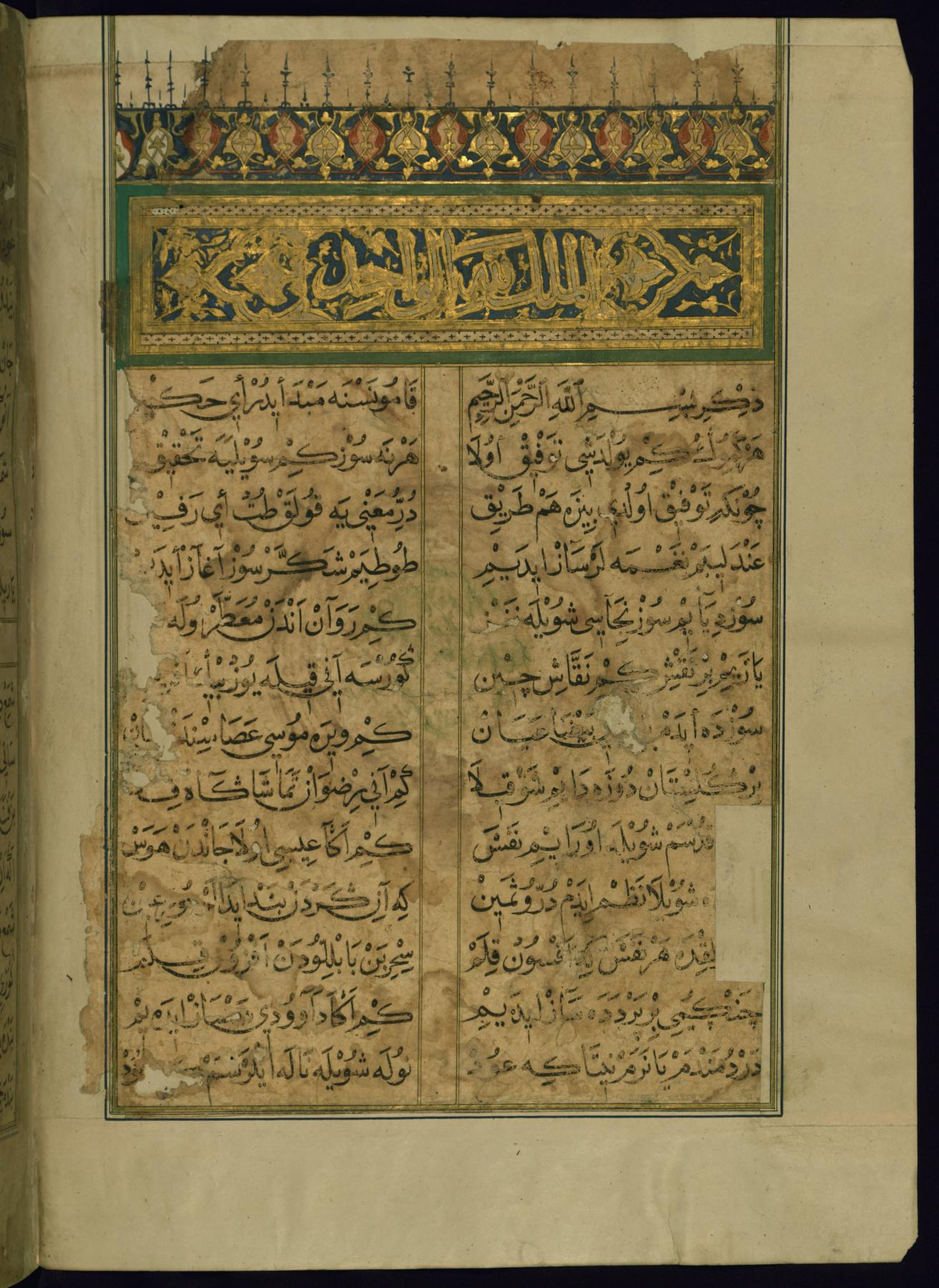

The İskendernâme (Epic of Alexander) is a poem by the Turkish poet Taceddin Ahmedi (1334–1413), completed in the early fifteenth century. It is the first work of Ottoman historiography and the first rendition of the Alexander Romance in Turkish.

The text begins with the life of Alexander (whose identity is intertwined with the Quranic figure of Dhu'l-Qarnayn), before moving into describing the reigns of the long list of rulers succeeding him. Arriving at the Islamic era, a lengthy section describes the reign of Muhammad, followed by the first four caliphs, then the Umayyad Caliphate and then the Abbasid Caliphate. After this, Ahmedi describes the reign of the Mongols beginning with Genghis Khan and then the Ilkhanate (the khanate established in the southwestern section of the Mongol Empire), their successors of the Mongol Jalayirid Sultanate, and finally the Ottoman rulers up until the accession of Mehmed I, the ruler of his own time when he completed the work.

Ahmedi was the most prolific Turkish poet of his time, and yet the İskendernâme was still his longest mathnawi, exceeding 8,000 couplets in length. The longest manuscript of the text of the seventy-five that are known, TY 921 located at the Istanbul University Library, is 8,754 couplets long. Ahmedi uses the Alexander legend "as a vehicle for delivering a series of discourses on theology, mysticism, philosophy, medicine, geography, astronomy, and other topics."

== Context ==
Ahmedi began to write his İskendernâme during the reign of Bayezid I (r. 1389–1402), who suggested to Ahmedi that he should produce a translation of the Iskandarnama of the Persian poet Nizami Ganjavi. Ahmedi turned the process into his own literary work and he intended to use it to convey to Bayezid that his wars should not be against fellow Muslim rulers in Anatolia but against Christians. When Bayezid died, Ahmedi continued to work on the text and altered his intention to instead dedicate it to the new ruler and the son of Bayezid, Emir Suleyman. Suleyman too, however, died before the work could be completed. Finally, once Mehmed I took the Ottoman throne and succeeded in eliminating all competitors in 1412, Ahmedi finally completed the text and dedicated it to him in the same year and presented it to him personally; he succeeded in finding favor with Mehmed and came into the service of the state. Mehmed had an appreciation for Greco-Roman classical culture and positively viewed how the İskendernâme depicted his state and the Ottomans as successors of Alexander the Great.

== Ottoman history ==
A large portion of the text is dedicated to conveying a world history, with the last and most important chapter (entitled the Tevârîh-i Mülûk-i âl-i ʿOsmân / Dastan ve Tevarihi Ali Osman / Dastan; "History of the Rulers of the House of Osman and Their Campaigns Against the Infidels") on the subject of the history of the Ottoman dynasty from Ertuğrul (father of the Osman I, founder of the Ottoman dynasty) until the accession of Mehmed I to the throne, detailing the heroic deeds and exploits of the rulers, overall running 334 couplets in length.

In the work, Ahmedi casts Suleyman as an ideal Perso-Islamic king but also frames his peace policy, resulting from his defeat at the hands of the Christian rulers of Rumelia, as that of his own choice as opposed to necessity. Likewise, he contrasts what he perceived to be the injustice of the Mongols (especially in light of the Mongol invasions of Muslim lands) with the early Ottomans, whom Ahmedi hails for their justice.

== Genre ==
The İskendernâme is the earliest text in the Alexander Romance genre in the Turkish language and it is also the earliest surviving work of Ottoman historiography, composed a little over a century after the Ottoman Empire was born. It may also be designated as a chronicle, a work of the Mirror for Princes genre, or the first example of a destân (epic) used as a work of advice i.e. a naṣīḥatnāme (a type of book of advice for rulers).

== Influence ==
Due to the influence of Ahmedi's İskendernâme, both his brother Hamzavī and another Ottoman Turkish poet writing towards the end of the fifteenth century, Ahmed Redvan, would compose their own İskendernâme.

Ahmedi's İskendernâme would also come to be incorporated into later Ottoman history books, including the anonymous Tevarihi Ali Osman (1485) and the 1561 edition of Neşri’s Cihannüma. It also immediately became the main reference for historians in Ahmedi's time and thereafter with respect to the first century of the Ottoman Empire.

Though criticized by 16th-century Turkish writers as a mere translation of the Iskandarnama of Nizami, it is an original work which works within the outlines of earlier Alexander legends but also modifies them to convey its own ideas.

== Editions ==
- Ahmedī, İskender-nāme: İnceleme, Tıpkıbasım, ed. İsmail Ünver (Ankara: Türk Tarih Kurumu, 1983).
- Currently the most up-to-date critical edition of this final chapter, including a transliteration, translation, analysis of textual variants and detailed glossary of words appearing in the text, was published by Kemal Silay in 1992.

== See also ==
- Alexander the Great in Islamic tradition
- Qissat al-Iskandar
