= Basiri (poet) =

16th century Ottoman poet

Basiri (died 1534, Khorasan), was a prominent poet in the 16th century. He left the Timurid court and found patronage in Constantinople (now Istanbul), where he wrote poetry for Ottoman sultans. Basiri brought the poetic works of Jami and Nava'i to the Ottoman court.

== Biography ==
Basiri's place of birth is disputed. Both Aşık Çelebi and Qinalizade state Khorasan, while Latifi and Ahdi state his origins were in "Ajam" or the fringes of "Ajam". He was known as Alaca because of his skin disease (leprosy).

A Persian émigré from the Timurid court, Basiri emigrated to the Aq Qoyunlu Confederation. Basiri wrote for the Aq Qoyunlu rulers and in 1487 traveled to Herat, joining Jami and Nava'i. (Note: Kınalızâde Hasan Çelebi makes no mention of Basiri being associated with the Aq Qoyunlus)

After visiting Constantinople (now Istanbul) in 1491, Basiri took the opportunity to join a mission to Bayezid II, and quickly gained the patronage of the Ottoman sultan. He brought the works of Nava'i and Jami to the Ottoman Empire. Basiri wrote poetry in Turkish (Note: Basiri uses Chaghatay verbs in his poetry, while Mehmed Cavusoglu claims there are traces of Azerbaijani Turkish in Basiri's poetry.) and Persian, and it was in Persian that he wrote two lines mourning Jami's death. Basiri died in 1534.

== Sources ==
- Algar, Hamid (2019). "Jami and the Ottomans". In d'Hubert, Thibaut; Papas, Alexandre (eds.). Jāmī in Regional Contexts: The Reception of ʿAbd al-Raḥmān Jāmī's Works in. Brill.
- Kim, Sooyong (2017). The Last of an Age: The Making and Unmaking of a Sixteenth-Century Ottoman Poet. Routledge.
- Pfeifer, Helen (2022). Empire of Salons: Conquest and Community in Early Modern Ottoman Lands. Princeton University Press.
