= Taceddin Ahmedi =

Turkish poet (1334–1413)

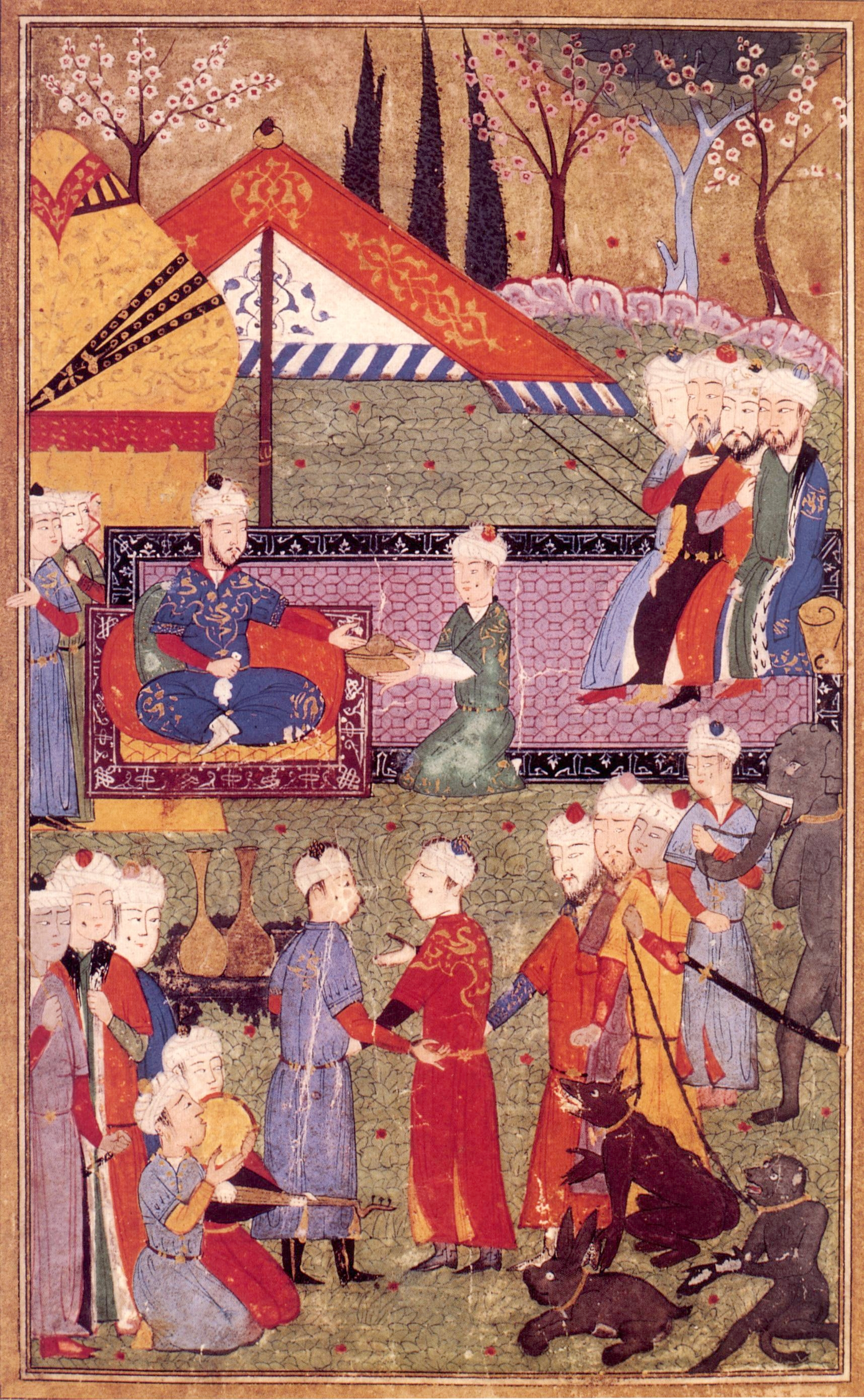
Miniature from the manuscript of Ahmedi's "Iskendername" written and painted in Edirne in the middle of the 15th century. Biblioteca Marciana

Taj ad-Dīn İbrahim ibn Hizr Ahmedi (1334–1413), better known by his pen name Taceddin Ahmedi, was an Ottoman poet and is considered one of the greatest poets in 14th-century Anatolia. Born in Anatolia, he went to study with Akmal al-Din al-Babarti in Cairo as a young man. As a young man, he visited the court of Bayezid I, and attended the Battle of Ankara, where he met and wrote and qasida to Timur. After Bayezid's death, he dedicated his work titled the Iskendername, the earliest surviving work of Ottoman historiography and the earliest Turkish rendition of the Alexander Romance, to Süleyman Çelebi. Modeled after the Iskandarnameh of Neẓāmī, in over 8,000 couplets Ahmedi uses the outline of Alexander the Great's conquests to offer discourse on philosophy, theology, and history. After his patron's death, he was in the employ of Mehmed I until his death in 1413.

== See also ==
- Alexander the Great in the Shahnameh
