= Jami =

Persian poet (1414–1492)

Mawlanā Jami
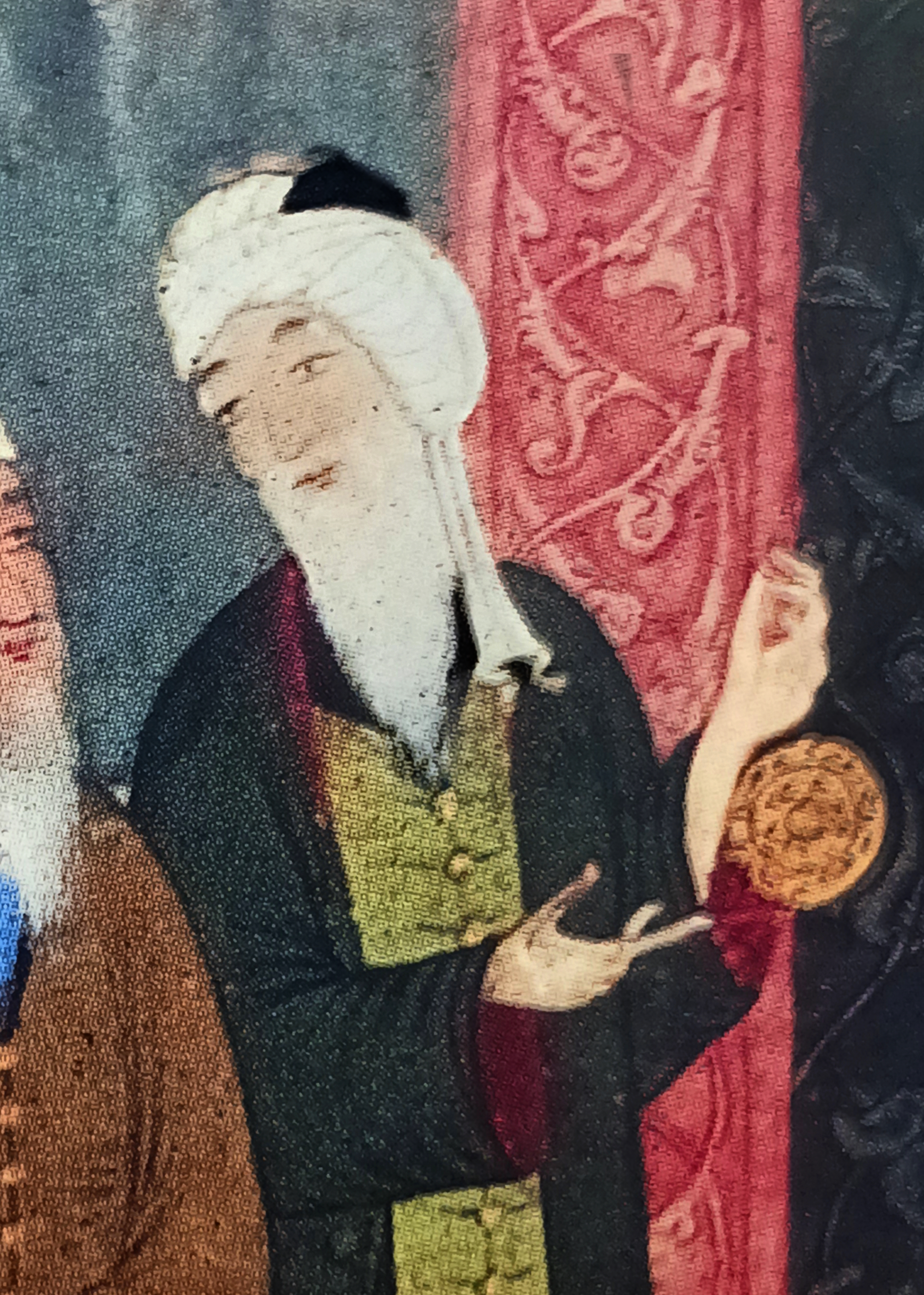
- Contemporary depiction of Jami holding an astrolabe, by Behzâd, from the Romance of Alexander by Nezâmî. Manuscript of the Khamseh of the emir 'Alî Fârsî Barlas, Herat 1494-1495; British Library, Or. 6810, f 225 v

Mystic, spiritual poet, historian, theologian
- Born: 7 November 1414; Torbat Jam, Timurid Empire (present-day Iran)
- Died: 9 November 1492 (aged 78); Herat, Timurid Empire (present-day Afghanistan)
- Venerated in: Sunni Islam
- Influences: Muhammad, Khwaja Abdullah Ansari, Rumi, Ibn Arabi
- Influenced: Muhammad Iqbal
- Tradition or genre: Sufi poetry

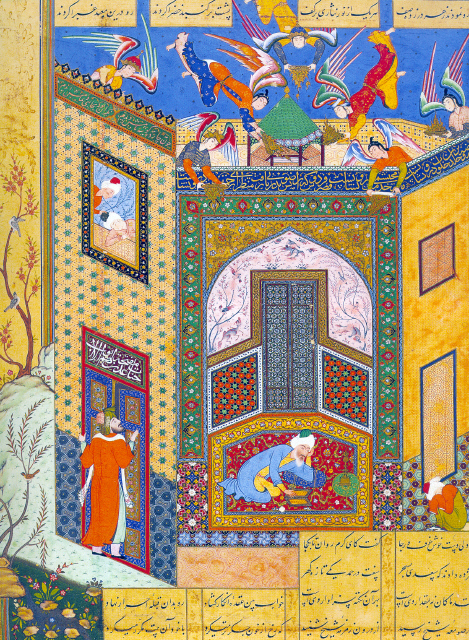
Illustration from Jami's Rose Garden of the Pious, dated 1553. The image blends Persian poetry and Persian miniature into one, as is the norm for many works of Persian literature.

Nūr ad-Dīn 'Abd ar-Rahmān Jāmī (Persian: نورالدین عبدالرحمن جامی; 7 November 1414 – 9 November 1492), also known as Mawlanā Nūr al-Dīn 'Abd al-Rahmān or Abd-Al-Rahmān Nur-Al-Din Muhammad Dashti, or simply as Jami or Djāmī and in Turkey as Molla Cami, was a Sunni poet who is known for his achievements as a prolific scholar and writer of mystical Sufi literature. He was primarily a prominent poet-theologian of the school of Ibn Arabi and a Khwājagānī Sũfī, recognized for his eloquence and for his analysis of the metaphysics of mercy. His most famous poetic works are Haft Awrang, Tuhfat al-Ahrar, Layla wa Majnun, Fatihat al-Shabab, Lawa'ih, Al-Durrah al-Fakhirah. Jami belonged to the Naqshbandi Sufi order.

== Biography ==
Jami was born in Kharjerd, in Khorasan to a Persian family. Previously his father Nizām al-Dīn Ahmad b. Shams al-Dīn Muhammad had come from Dasht, a small town in the district of Isfahan. A few years after his birth, his family migrated to Herat, where he was able to study Peripateticism, mathematics, Persian literature, natural sciences, Arabic language, logic, rhetoric, and Islamic philosophy at the Nizamiyya (higher education institution). His father, also a Sufi, became his first teacher and mentor. While in Herat, Jami held an important position at the Timurid court, involved in the era's politics, economics, philosophy and religious life. Jami was a Sunni Muslim.

Because his father was from Dasht, Jami's early pen name was Dashti, but later, he chose to use Jami because of two reasons he later mentioned in a poem:

مولدم جام و رشحهء قلمم
جرعهء جام شیخ الاسلامی است
لاجرم در جریدهء اشعار
به دومعنی تخلصم جامی است

My birthplace is Jam, and my pen
Has drunk from (knowledge of) Sheikh-ul-Islam (Ahmad) Jam
Hence in the books of poetry
My pen name is Jami for these two reasons.

Jami was a mentor and friend of the famous Turkic poet Alisher Navoi, as evidenced by his poems:

او که یک ترک بود و من تاجیک،
هردو داشتیم خویشی نزدیک.
Ō ke yak Turk būd o man Tājīk
Hardū dāštēm xwēšī-e nazdīk

Though he was a Turk, and I am Tajik,
We were close to each other.

Afterward, he went to Samarkand, the most important center of scientific studies in the Muslim world and completed his studies there. He embarked on a pilgrimage that greatly enhanced his reputation and further solidified his importance through the Persian world. Jami had a brother called Molana Mohammad, who was, apparently a learned man and a master in music, and Jami has a poem lamenting his death. Jami fathered four sons, but three of them died before reaching their first year. The surviving son was called Zia-ol-din Yusef and Jami wrote his Baharestan for this son.

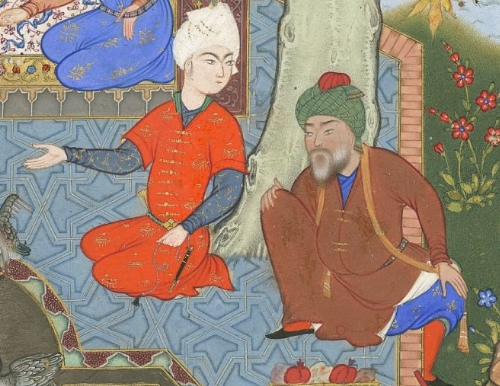
Youth seeking his father's advice on love from the Haft Awrang of Jami, in the story "A Father Advises his Son About Love"

At the end of his life he was living in Herat. His epitaph reads "When your face is hidden from me, like the moon hidden on a dark night, I shed stars of tears and yet my night remains dark in spite of all those shining stars." There is a variety of dates regarding his death, but consistently most state it was in November 1492. Although, the actual date of his death is somewhat unknown the year of his death marks an end of both his greater poetry and contribution, but also a pivotal year of political change where Spain was no longer inhabited by the Arabs after 781 years. His funeral was conducted by the prince of Herat and attended by great numbers of people demonstrating his profound impact.

== Teachings and Sufism ==
In his role as Sufi shaykh, which began in 1453, Jami expounded a number of teachings regarding following the Sufi path. He created a distinction between two types of Sufi's, now referred to as the "prophetic" and the "mystic" spirit. Jami is known for both his extreme piety and mysticism. He remained a staunch Sunni on his path toward Sufism and developed images of earthly love and its employment to depict the spiritual passion of the seeker of God. He began to take an interest in Sufism at an earlier age when he received a blessing by a principal associate Khwaja Mohammad Parsa who came through town. From there he sought guidance from Sa'd-alDin Kasgari based on a dream where he was told to take God and become his companion. Jami followed Kasagari and the two became tied together upon Jami's marriage to Kasgari's granddaughter. He was known for his commitment to God and his desire for separation from the world to become closer to God often causing him to forget social normalities.

After his re-emergence into the social world he became involved in a broad range of social, intellectual and political actives in the cultural center of Herat. He was engaged in the school of Ibn Arabi, greatly enriching, analyzing, and also changing the school or Ibn Arabi. Jami continued to grow in further understanding of God through miraculous visions and feats, hoping to achieve a great awareness of God in the company of one blessed by Him. He believed there were three goals to achieve "permanent presence with God" through ceaselessness and silence, being unaware of one's earthly state, and a constant state of a spiritual guide. Jami wrote about his feeling that God was everywhere and inherently in everything. He also defined key terms related to Sufism including the meaning of sainthood, the saint, the difference between the Sufi and the one still striving on the path, the seekers of blame, various levels of tawhid, and the charismatic feats of the saints. Oftentimes Jami's methodology did not follow the school of Ibn Arabi, like in the issue of mutual dependence between God and his creatures Jami stated "We and Thou are not separate from each other, but we need Thee, whereas Thou dost not need us."

Jami created an all-embracing unity emphasized in a unity with the lover, beloved, and the love one, removing the belief that they are separated. Jami was in many ways influenced by various predecessors and current Sufi's, incorporating their ideas into his own and developing them further, creating an entirely new concept. In his view, love for Muhammad was the fundamental stepping stone for starting on the spiritual journey. Jami served as a master to several followers and to one student who asked to be his pupil who claimed never to have loved anyone, he said, "Go and love first, then come to me and I will show you the way." For several generations, Jami had a group of followers representing his knowledge and impact. Jami continues to be known for not only his poetry, but his learned and spiritual traditions of the Persian speaking world. In analyzing Jami's work greatest contribution may have been his analysis and discussion of God's mercy towards man, redefining the way previous texts were interpreted.

== Works ==
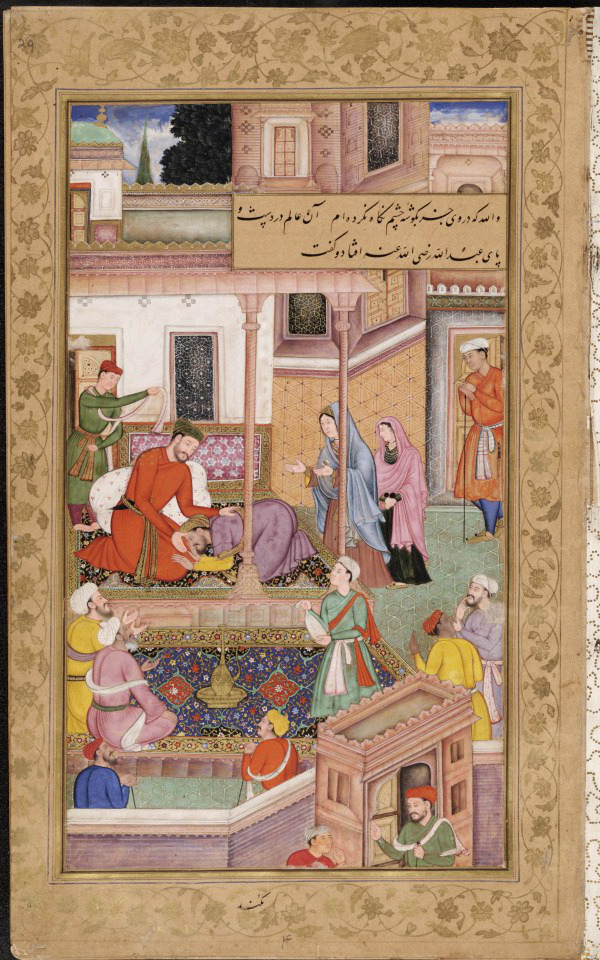
Illustration from the Bahâristân, dated 1595, with two lines of included script

Jami wrote approximately eighty-seven (87) books and letters, some of which have been translated into English. His works range from prose to poetry, and from the mundane to the religious. He has also written works of history and science. As well, he often comments on the work of previous and current theologians, philosophers and Sufis.

In Herat, his manual of irrigation design included advanced drawings and calculations and is still a key reference for the irrigation department. His poetry has been inspired by the ghazals of Hafiz, and his famous divan Haft Awrang (Seven Thrones) is, by his own admission, influenced by the works of Nizami. The Haft Awrang also known as the long masnavis or mathnawis are a collection of seven poems. Each poem discusses a different story such as the Salaman va Absal that tells the story of a carnal attraction of a prince for his wet-nurse. Jami uses allegorical symbolism within the tale to depict the key stages of the Sufi path such as repentance and expose philosophical, religious, or ethical questions. Each of the allegorical symbols has a meaning highlighting knowledge and intellect, particularly of God. This story reflects Jamī's idea of the Sufi-king as the ideal medieval Islamic ruler to repent and embark upon the Sufi path to realize his rank as God's 'true' vicegerent and become closer to God.

Another composition of Jami is that of the Kherad-name, which he composed in the tradition of the Alexander Romance, especially in that of the Persian version of Nizami Ganjavi's Iskandarnameh. He completed this work perhaps around 1485, and in it he moves the emphasis from stories about Alexander's journey and conquest to short anecdotes that display notions of wisdom and philosophy.

As well, Jami is known for his three collections of lyric poems that range from his youth towards the end of his life called the Fatihat al-shabab (The Beginning of Youth), Wasitat al-'ikd (The Central Pearl in the Necklace), and Khatimat al-hayat (The conclusion of Life). Throughout Jami's work references to Sufism and the Sufi emerge as being key topics. One of his most profound ideas was the mystical and philosophical explanations of the nature of divine mercy, which was a result of his commentary on other works.

== Artwork ==
Jami is also known for his poetry influencing and being included with Persian paintings that depict Persian history through manuscript paintings. Most of his own literature included illustrations that were not yet common for literature. The deep poetry Jami provides is usually accompanied with enriched paintings reflecting the complexity of Jami's work and Persian culture.

== Impact of Jami's works ==
Jami worked within the Tīmūrid court of Herat helping to serve as an interpreter and communicator. His poetry reflected Persian culture and was popular through Islamic East, Central Asia and the Indian subcontinent. Jami's poetry addressed popular ideas that led to Sufi's and non-Sufi's interest in his work. He was known not only for his poetry, but his theological works and commentary on culture. His work was used in several schools from Samarqand to Istanbul to Khayrābād in Persia as well as in the Mughal Empire. For centuries Jami was known for his poetry and profound knowledge. In the last half-century, Jami has begun to be neglected and his works forgotten, which reflects an overarching issue in the lack of research of Islamic and Persian studies. His poetry reached the Ottoman Empire, due to the poet Basiri emigrating to Constantinople.

== Divan of Jami ==
Among his works are:

- Baharestan (Abode of Spring) Modeled upon the Gulestan of Saadi
- Diwanha-ye Sehganeh (Triplet Divans)
- Al-Fawaed-Uz-Ziya'iya. A commentary on Ibn al-Hajib's treatise on Arab grammar Al-Kafiya. This commentary has been a staple of Ottoman Madrasas' curricula under its author's name Molla Cami.
- Haft Awrang (Seven Thrones) His major poetical work. The fifth of the seven stories is his acclaimed "Yusuf and Zulaykha", which tells the story of Joseph and Potiphar's wife based on the Quran.
- Jame -esokanan-e Kaja Parsa
- Lawa'ih A treatise on Sufism (Shafts of Light)
- Nafahat al-Uns (Breaths of Fellowship) Biographies of the Sufi Saints
- Resala-ye manasek-e hajj
- Resala-ye musiqi
- Resala-ye tariq-e Kvajagan
- Resala-ye sarayet-e dekr
- Resala-ye so al o jawab-e Hendustan
- Sara-e hadit-e Abi Zarrin al-Aqili
- Sar-rešta-yetariqu-e Kājagān (The Quintessence of the Path of the Masters)
- Shawahidal-nubuwwa (Distinctive Signs of Prophecy)
- Tajnīs 'al-luġāt (Homonymy/Punning of Languages) A lexicographical work containing homonymous Persian and Arabic lemmata.
- Tuhfat al-ahrar (The Gift to the Noble)

Along with his works are his contributions to previous works and works that have been created in response to his new ideas.

== Legacy ==
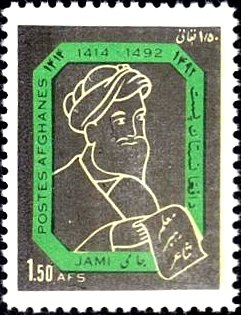
Mawlana Jami in Stamp of Afghanistan, 1968

Shortly after Jami's death, and with the reconfiguration of borders, the emergence of the 'Persianate world' with empires such as Safavid, Uzbek, Ottoman, and Mughal: his works were disseminated as far as to regions such as the Deccan. The term "Persianate world", a relatively contemporary expression, would indicate regions such as Afghanistan, Iran, and a few regions in Central Asia. However, contemporary scholars perceive the usage of this word in a more transnational fashion, i.e., also take into account all the regions wherein Persian as a language, culture, and tradition flourished and developed. For instance, the Indian subcontinent is one such region where Persian (ever since the fifteenth and sixteenth centuries) evolved and played a significant role. Not only was Persian the court language of the Mughal Empire, but it was also the language of official discourses led by intellectuals and civil society. Although the native Persian speakers of Iran always distinguished themselves from their counterparts in South Asia. The former considered themselves as superior to the latter. Despite the politics of language and geo-cultural identity, Jami was well recognised in the Indian subcontinent, during his lifetime prior to the consolidation of the Mughal Empire. This was because of Mahmud Gavan ʿImad al-Din (d. 886/1481), a Gilani migrant who was in service of the Bahman Shahs of the Deccan. Gavan invited Jami to migrate to India, but the latter politely refused citing the health issues of his mother. However, when one acquaintance was tempted to migrate, Jami asserted to not quit “the Khorasanian homeland for the black land of India”. Through both these instances, one can see Jami’s strong affinity with the Persianate land.

In the context of the Indian subcontinent, Jami's legacy and influence in the post-Timurid period can significantly be perceived in various instances. The first Mughal emperor Zahir al-Din Babur, in his memoir Baburnama, referred to Jami as the "foremost authority of the age in all of the sciences and as a poet of such renown that the mere mention of his name is a source of blessing". According to British-American professor of Persian Studies Hamid Algar, it was not Jami's ghazals or qasidas, but masnavis such as Yusuf and Zulaykha that were thought of so eminent insofar subsequent Mughal emperors post-Babur like Humayun, Akbar, Jahangir, Shahjahan produced their own versions of the narrative as late as the nineteenth century. Jami's influence on the Persianized Urdu in the Indian subcontinent and many Urdu poets such as Ghalib has also been well documented in South Asia. For instance, one of Ghalib's contemporary biographers Mehr Afshan Farooqi, while discussing the so-called Indian style or Mughal-Safavid style in the context of the history of Persian poetry, traces the Persian influence on Urdu to Baba Fighani, a pupil of Jami.

== See also ==
- Ghazal
- Naqshbandi
- Fariduddin Attar
- Hazrat Ishaan
- Ahmad Sirhindi
- List of Persian poets and authors
- Persian literature
