= Iskandarnama (Nizami) =

Poetry by Persian poet Nizami Ganjavi

The Iskandarnama (Note: Less commonly written Eskandarnameh or Iskandarnameh, after the modern Iranian Persian pronunciation (Eskandarnâme).) (Classical Persian: اسکندرنامه Iskandarnāma, lit. 'Book of Alexander') is a poetic production in the Alexander Romance tradition authored by the Persian poet Nizami Ganjavi (d. 1209) that describes Alexander the Great as an idealized hero, sage, and king. More uniquely, he is also a seeker of knowledge who debates with great Greek and Indian philosophers, one of them being Plato.

The poem is the fourth part of the Khamsa of Nizami, a posthumous collection of five of Nizami's major works. It consists of two main and independent parts: the Sharaf-nama (Book of Glory) followed by the Iqbal-nama (Book of Fortune) (though the names are reversed in some copies). Both are written in rhymed couplets. In India, the two sections are known as the Eskandar-(or Sekandar-) nāma-ye barrī and baḥrī respectively. It was likely completed by 1194.

== Narrative ==
=== Summary ===
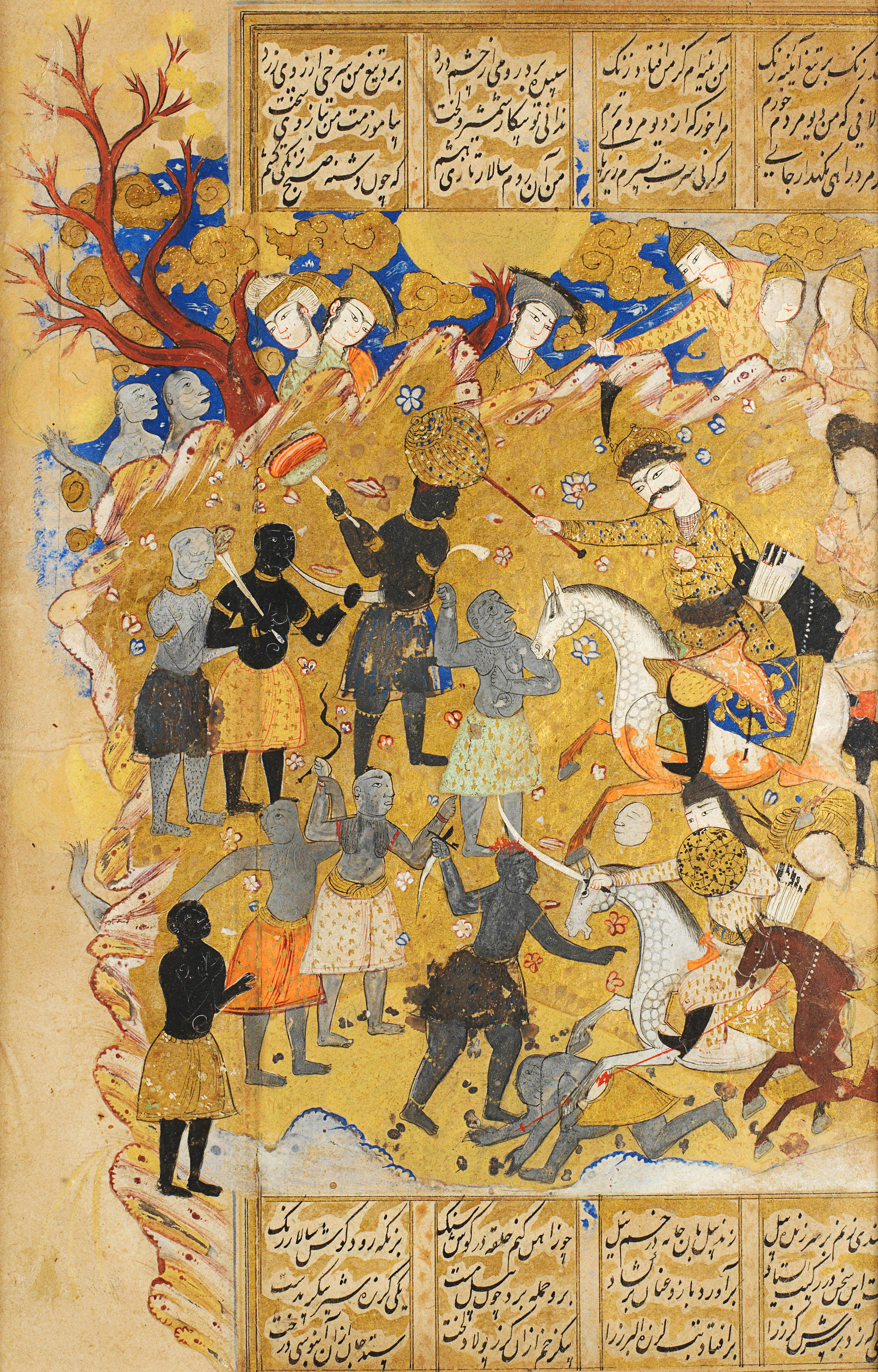
Iskandar slaughters an army of Zangis (South-East-African Bantus).

The Sharaf-nama discusses the birth of Alexander, his succession to the throne of Rum (Greece), his wars against Africans who invaded Egypt, his conquest of Persia and his marriage to the daughter of Darius. The episode also discusses Alexander's pilgrimage to Mecca, his stay in the Caucasus and his visit to Queen Nushaba of Barda' and her court of Amazons. Alexander conquers India, China and the land of the Rus. The Sharafnama concludes with Alexander's unsuccessful search for the water of immortal life.

The Iqbal-nameh is a description of Alexander's personal growth into the ideal ruler on a model ultimately derived, through Islamic intermediaries, from Plato's Republic. He has debates with Greek and Indian philosophers (e.g. Garshaspnama) and a major portion of the text is devoted to the discourses he has with seven Greek sages. The poet then tells of Alexander's end and adds an account of the circumstances of the death of each of the seven sages. Nezami's image of Alexander is that of an Iranian knight.

=== Fountain of Life ===
The Iskandarnama follows the general outlines of Alexander the Great in the Shahnameh, an earlier text of Persian poetry composed by Ferdowsi, in its narration of how Alexander encounters the Fountain of Life. First, Alexander gives a jewel to the mystical figure, Khidr, and instructs him to use it to help find a body of shining water. Khidr does so, drinking from the water when he finds it. In doing so, he also learns that Alexander will not drink as he did and so disappears without informing him. At this point, Nizami introduces a second version of the narrative unconnected to the Shahnameh. This account, says Nizami, derives from the Byzantines. In this account, Khidr is accompanied to the water by the prophet Elijah (Ilyas). They bring some provisions of food during their journey, including bread and a salted fish. Upon finding the body of water, the fish falls into it and comes to life (this episode is thought to be related to a narrative in Surah Al-Kahf (chapter 18) of the Quran). When Khidr and Ilyas see what happened to the fish, they determine that they have discovered the water of life and begin to drink from it. Finally, Nizami introduces yet another third version of the narrative which he claims to be the correct one: as with the second version, Khidr and Elijah find the water of life together and drink from it. They decide to leave Alexander's party and both go their separate ways, one of them going to the sea and another to the desert.

== Manuscripts ==
Manuscripts of the Iskandarnama are often illustrated with various paintings and drawings. Statistical analysis has identified 127 themes across the illustrations of Iskandarnama manuscripts, out of a total of 338 themes across Nizami's entire Khamsa. The most popular illustration depicts Alexander with the dying Dara, appearing 86 times. The one with Qaidafa appears 45 times. The construction of the iron gates against Gog and Magog was identified 9 times in the analysis, though more are known now.

One manuscript of the Iskandarnama, which has received a dedicated study, was originally produced for and presented to Ibrahim Sultan of the Timurid Empire.

== Editions and translations ==
=== Editions ===
The first considerable effort to produce critical editions of the two sections of the Iskandarnama occurred in Baku (the capital of Azerbaijan) in 1947, under the purview of Ä. Ä. Älizadä (Šaraf-nāma) and F. Babayev (Eqbāl-nāma). Behrūz Ṯarvatīān's recent edition of the Šaraf-nāma (1989) primarily replicates the text and apparatus found in the Baku edition. However, it also includes explanatory notes. Another edition has been produced by Ḥasan Waḥīd Dastgerdī (Tehran, 1937–38), but it is uncritical and filled with error.

=== Translations ===
Complete translations of both poems into Russian verse were produced by K. Lipskerov in Baku in 1953. There are Russian prose translations by Y. E. Bertel and A. K. Arends (Baku, 1983). An English prose translation of the Šaraf-nāma, accompanied by extensive extracts from Indian commentators, was also created by Wilberforce Clarke in 1881, though this translation is hard to read and very literal. J. Christoph Bürgel wrote a free German prose paraphrase of both sections, excluding parts of the prologues and epilogues, though it is disadvantaged by its reliance on Dastgerdī's edition.

== Literary predecessors ==
Ultimately, the Iskandarnama belongs to the genre of literature originating with the third-century Greek Alexander Romance composed by Pseudo-Callisthenes. The genre may have been translated into Pahlavi (a Middle Iranian script) from the Syriac recension, although this theory proposed first by Theodor Nöldeke is not universally accepted among historians.

The Iskandarnama was profoundly influenced by the Shahnameh of Ferdowsi. The Shahnameh provided Nizami with the outline of an Alexander cycle, and Nizami fully develops the incipient ideas in Ferdowsi's writings that a pre-Islamic ethos was embodied by Alexander the Great. Therefore, Alexander is represented as a prophet on a righteous, divinely sanctioned path.

== Legacy and impact ==
=== Influence on subsequent Alexander legends ===
Amir Khusrau, a Persian poet and scholar of the thirteenth and fourteenth centuries, modelled the fourth masnavi of his Khamsa-e-Khusrau (Khamsa of Khusrau), called the Ayina-i Iskandari (The Alexandrine Mirror). Though Nizami portrays Alexander as a prophet and philosopher, Khusrau portrays him as an adventurer and scientist.

Other progenies of Nizami's include the Kherad-nâme (Book of Alexandrian Intelligence) of Jâmi and the Sadd-i Iskandari (Alexander's Wall) of Ali-Shir Nava'i.

Nizami's work would also come to have a substantial impact on Indo-Persian literature.

=== Translations ===
Nizami's Iskandarnama was translated into Urdu three times in the 19th century: by Munshi Azam Ali in 1849, by Ghulam Haider in 1878 under the title Guldastah-i-shajaat, and by Balak Ram Gauhar in 1896. In Sindhi, it was translated by Ghulam Muhammad in 1873. In Kashmiri, it was translated by Maulvi Siddiqullah some time before 1910.

== See also ==
- Hadith Dhi'l-Qarnayn
- Horns of Alexander
