= Reşadiye Marşı =

Imperial anthem of the Ottoman Empire from 1909 to 1918

English: March of Reşad
- Coat of arms of the Ottoman Empire.
- Imperial anthem of the Ottoman Empire
- Lyrics: Unknown
- Music: Italo Selvelli
- Adopted: 1909
- Relinquished: July 3, 1918

Audio sample
- Reşadiye Marşı: file; help

The Reşadiye Marşı (Ottoman Turkish: رشادیه مارشی) (English: March of Reşad) was the imperial anthem of the Ottoman Empire from 1909 to 1918. When Sultan Mehmed V Reşad ascended to the throne in 1909, a competition was announced to compose a personal march for the new sultan. The contest was won by Italo Selvelli, who was of Italian descent, as were nearly all the other composers of personal marches for previous sultans. Like the previous sultan's march, this anthem also had lyrics, but the content of the lyrics themselves is unknown.
