= Mecidiye Marşı =

Former anthem of the Ottoman Empire

English: March of Mecid
- Imperial anthem of Ottoman Empire
- Music: Giuseppe Donizetti
- Adopted: 1839
- Readopted: 1876; 1922
- Relinquished: June 25, 1861; August 31, 1876; March 3, 1924

Audio sample
- Mecidiye Marşı: file; help

The Mecidiye Marşı was the national anthem of the Ottoman Empire during the reign of Abdülmecid I (2 July 1839 – 25 June 1861) & Abdülmecid II (19 November 1922 - 3 March 1924). There were different anthems for each sultan. Franz Liszt visited the imperial capital and composed a paraphrase to this march named Grande paraphrase de la Marche de J. Donizetti composée pour Sa Majesté le Sultan Abdul-Medjid Khan. Donizetti had another march, Büyük Askerî Marş, also known as Grande marche de Medjidie, composed for Abdülmecid I during the same period. Donizetti mentions Liszt as enjoying the two imperial marches and obtaining the sheet music from him to play them as variations.

== See also ==
- Imperial anthems of the Ottoman Empire
