= Imperial anthems of the Ottoman Empire =

"Mahmudiye Marşı"

"Mecidiye Marşı"

"Hamidiye Marşı"

"Reşadiye Marşı"

The Ottoman Empire used anthems since its foundation in the late 13th century, but did not use a specific imperial or national anthem until the 19th century. During the reign of Mahmud II, when the military and imperial band were re-organized along Western European lines, Giuseppe Donizetti was invited to head the process. Donizetti Pasha, as he was known in the Ottoman Empire, composed the first Western-style imperial anthem, the "March of Mahmud".

As was the case in many 19th-century monarchies, such as the Austrian Empire, the anthem of the Ottoman Empire was an imperial anthem, not a national one, so it paid homage to a specific ruler. However, unlike Western Europe, where the same music was used with modified lyrics (e.g. "Gott erhalte Franz den Kaiser" and "Marche Henri IV"), a new anthem was composed after each Ottoman imperial succession.

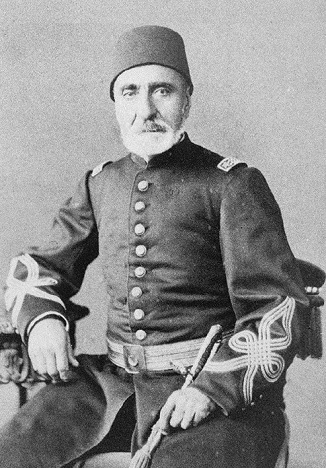
Necip Pasha composed the "Hamidiye Marşı" (March of Hamid)

- "March of Mahmud" – for Mahmud II (1829–1839, 1918–1922), by Giuseppe Donizetti
- "Mecidiye Marşı" – for Abdülmecid I (1839–1861), by Giuseppe Donizetti
- "Aziziye Marşı" (March of Aziz) – for Abdulaziz (1861–1876), by Callisto Guatelli
- "Hamidiye Marşı" (March of Hamid) – for Abdul Hamid II (1876–1909), by Necip Paşa
- "Reşadiye Marşı" (March of Reshad) – for Mehmed V (1909–1918), by Italo Selvelli

After the start of the imperial anthem tradition, two Sultans did not have specific anthems composed. The first was Murad V, who reigned for 3 months in 1876, and the second was the last Sultan of the Ottoman Empire, Mehmed VI, who used "March of Mahmud".

Only the "March of Hamid" and "March of Reshad" had lyrics, the first three anthems being purely instrumental. The lyrics of the "March of Reshad" seem to have been lost in history.

== See also ==
- "İstiklal Marşı", national anthem of the Republic of Turkey
- Ottoman military band
- Culture of the Ottoman Empire
- Ottoman music
