= Hamidiye Marşı =

English: March of Hamid
- Coat of arms of the Ottoman Empire.
- Imperial anthem of Ottoman Empire
- Lyrics: Hacı Emin Bey
- Music: Necip Paşa
- Adopted: 1876
- Relinquished: 27 April 1909

Audio sample
- file; help

The Hamidiye Marşı (English: March of Hamid) was the imperial anthem of the Ottoman Empire from 1876 to 1909. In 1876, Sultan Abdul Hamid II had the Hamidiye March composed for him by Necip Paşa. It was one of the only 2 Ottoman anthems to have lyrics.

== Lyrics ==
Original lyrics in Ottoman Turkish

ای ولی نعمت عالم شهنشاه جهان
تخت عالی بخت عثمانی یه ویردڭ عزّو شان
سایۀ لطف همایونڭده عالم کامران
سلطنتله چوق زمان سلطان حمید ذوق ایت همان
چوق یشا ای پادشاهم شوکتڭله چوق یشا

Lyrics transliterated into Turkish alphabet

Ey veliyy-i ni'met-i 'âlem şehinşâh-ı cihân

Taht-ı 'âlî-baht-ı 'Osmânî'ye verdiñ 'izz ü şân

Sâye-i lütf-ı hümayûnuñda 'âlem kâm-rân

Saltanatle çok zamân Sultân Hamîd zevk et hemân

Çok yaşa ey pâdişâhım devletiñle çok yaşa

English translated version

Oh! benefactor of the world, sovereign of sovereigns!
You bestowed glory and honour upon the exalted and fortunate Ottoman throne,
Under the grace of your imperial favour, the world is prosperous,
May Sultan Hamîd enjoy the pleasures of your reign for a long time,
Long live, my emperor, long live with your state!
