= Flags of the Ottoman Empire =

Overview of the national flags used by the Ottoman Empire throughout history

Sublime Ottoman State
- The crescent and star flag of the Ottoman Empire, an early 19th-century design officially adopted in 1844
- Use: National flag and ensign
- Proportion: 2∶3
- Adopted: 1844
- Design: A red field charged with a white crescent and star slightly left-of-center.

The Ottoman Empire used various flags and naval ensigns during its history. The crescent and star came into use in the second half of the 18th century. A buyruldu (decree) from 1793 required that the ships of the Ottoman Navy were to use a red flag with the star and crescent in white. In 1844, a version of this flag, with a five-pointed star, was officially adopted as the Ottoman national flag. The decision to adopt a national flag was part of the Tanzimat reforms which aimed to modernize the Ottoman state in line with the laws and norms of contemporary European states and institutions.

The star and crescent design later became a common element in the national flags of Ottoman successor states in the 20th century. The current flag of Turkey is essentially the same as the late Ottoman flag, but has more specific legal standardizations (regarding its measures, geometric proportions, and exact tone of red) that were introduced with the Turkish Flag Law on 29 May 1936. Before the legal standardization, the star and crescent could have slightly varying slimness or positioning depending on the rendition.

== Early flags ==
Pre-modern Ottoman armies used the horse-tail standard or tugh rather than flags. Such standards remained in use alongside flags until the 19th century. A depiction of a tugh appears in the Relation d'un voyage du Levant by Joseph Pitton de Tournefort (1718). War flags came into use by the 16th century. During the 16th and 17th centuries, Ottoman war flags often depicted the bifurcated Zulfiqar sword, often misinterpreted in Western literature as showing a pair of scissors.

The crescent symbol appears in flags attributed to Tunis from as early as the 14th century (Libro de conoscimiento), long before Tunis fell under Ottoman rule in 1574. But the crescent as a symbol also had 14th-century associations with the Ottoman military and millennium-long associations with the city of Istanbul, which became the Ottoman capital after its conquest in 1453. The Spanish Navy Museum in Madrid shows two Ottoman naval flags dated 1613; both are swallow-tailed, one green with a white crescent near the hoist, the other white with two red stripes near the edges of the flag and a red crescent near the hoist.

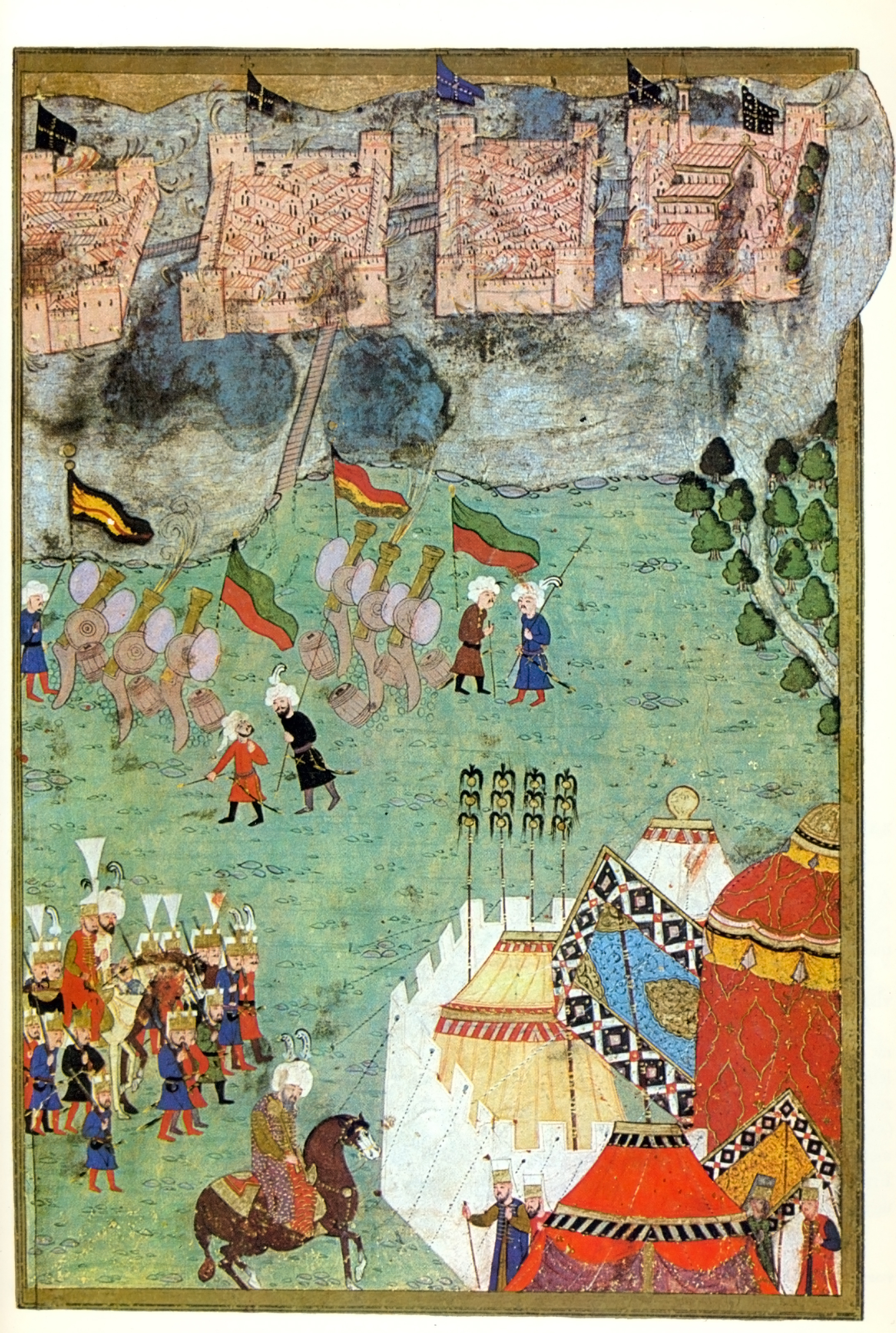
Various Ottoman flags and tughs displayed before the Siege of Szigetvár in 1566

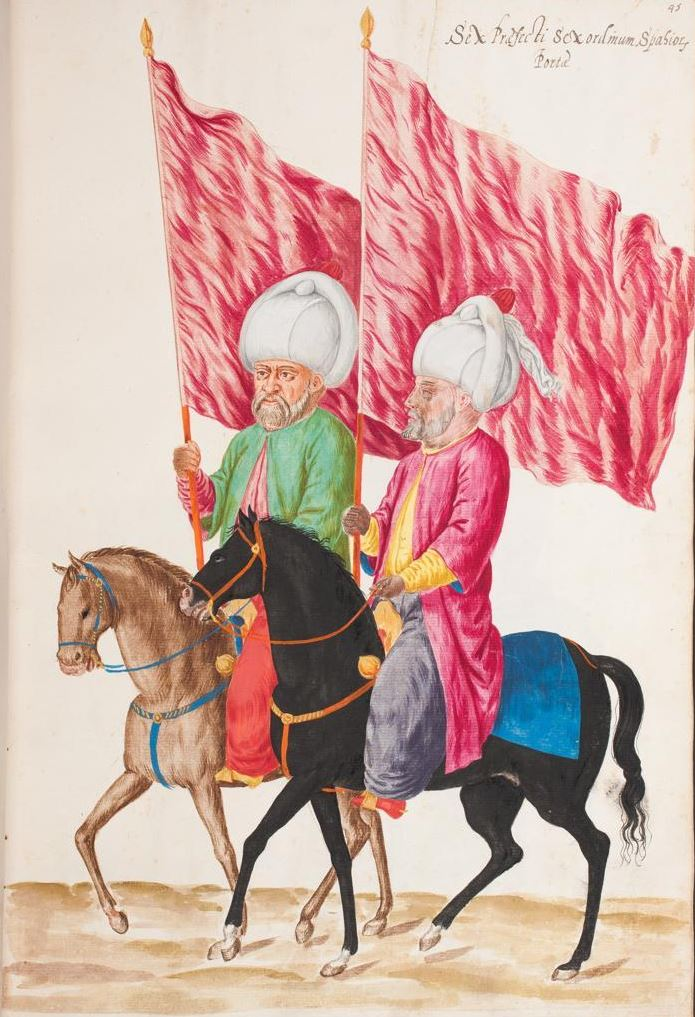
Plain red banners for the Sultan's retinue. From the Turkish Costume Book by Lambert de Vos, 1574.

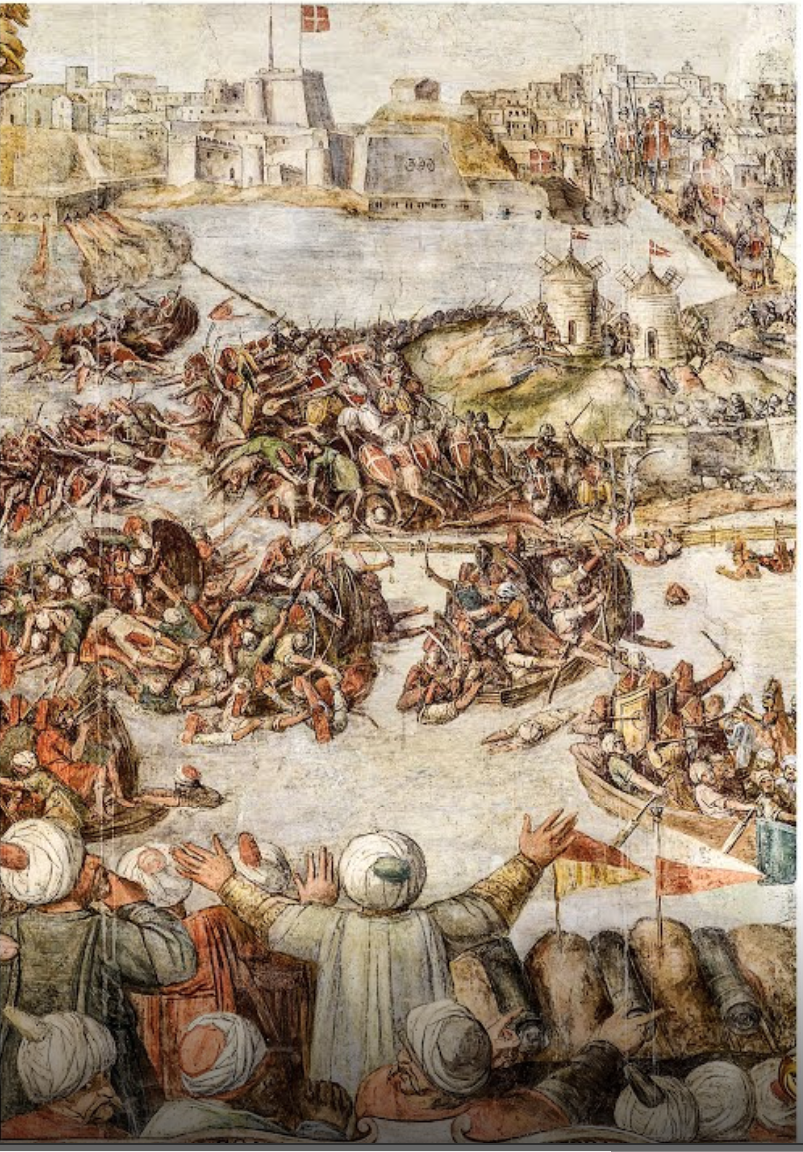
Ottoman flags in a 1581 fresco by Matteo Pérez depicting the Great Siege of Malta

Zulfikar flag typically in use during the 16th and 17th centuries. The design is a rough approximation of the Zulfikar flag used by Selim I in the 1510s.

Zulfiqar flag captured during the Battle of Guruslău in 1601

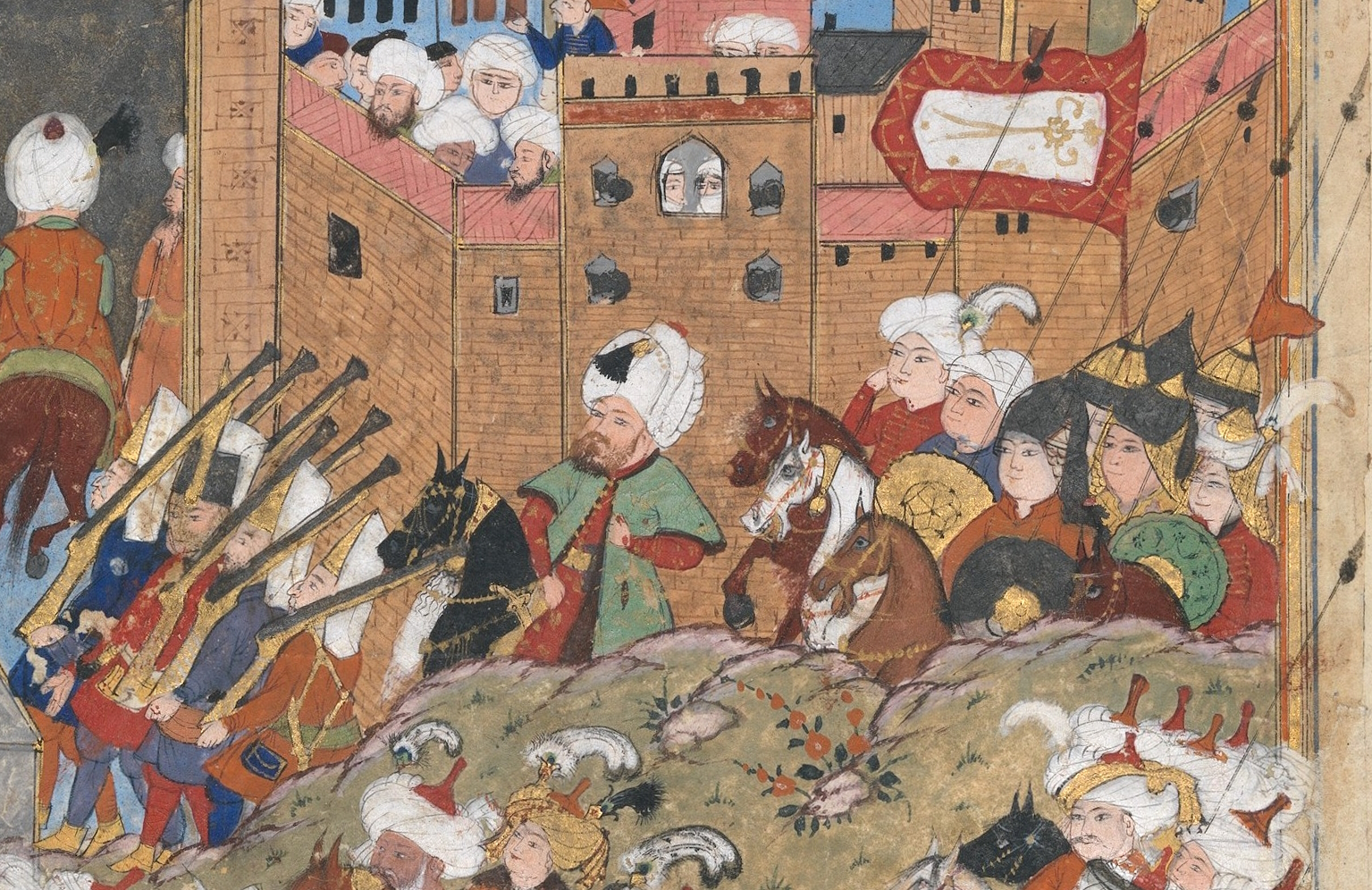
Sokulluzade Hasan Pasha leading in troops with a Zulfiqar flag in 1590. Divan of Mahmud Abd al-Baki, 1590–95

Coat of arms of Moldavia, c. 1812. As supporters, flags which Sultan Mahmud II (r. 1808–1839) may have granted to Scarlat Callimachi (r. 1806–1819).

== Crescent flag ==

Flag used by the Ottoman Empire (c. 1480-1780).

The simple crescent flag started to appear in the Ottoman Empire from its foundation in 1453, and was reported as late as 1780 in the Battle of Kagul.

Flag of the Ottoman Empire (1590–1646)

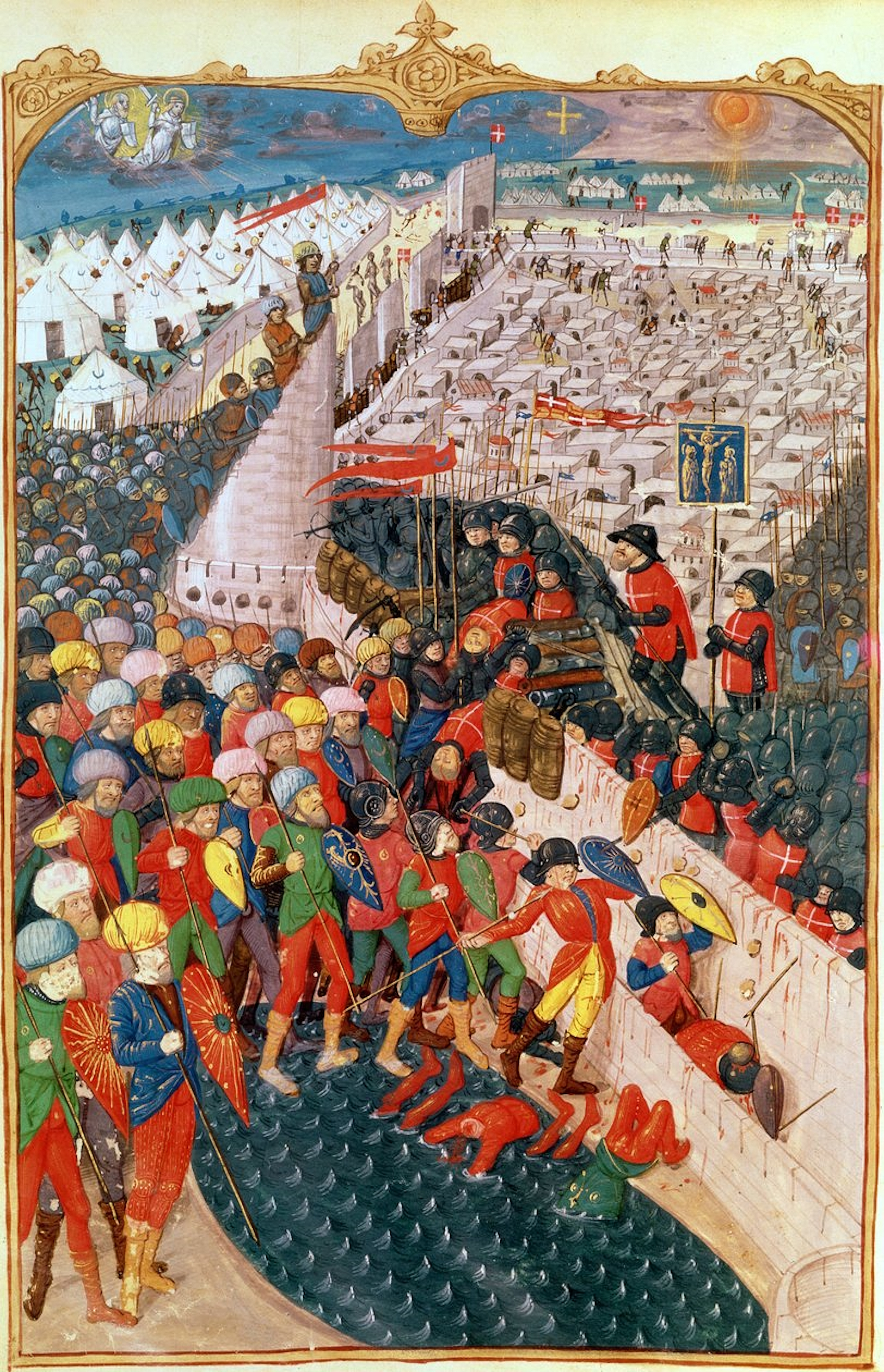
Siege of Rhodes, 1480

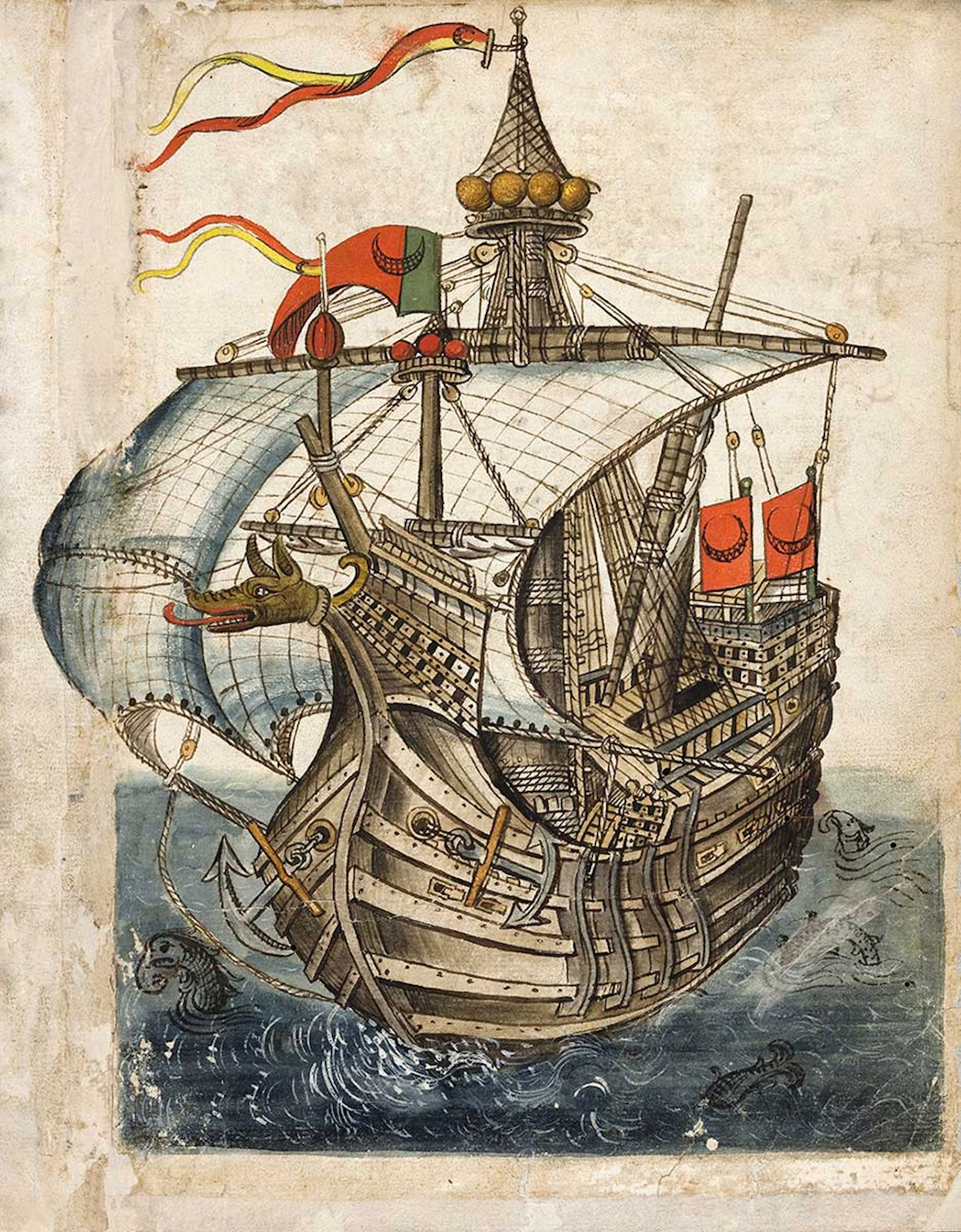
Ottoman ship, 1487

Portolan chart, 1590

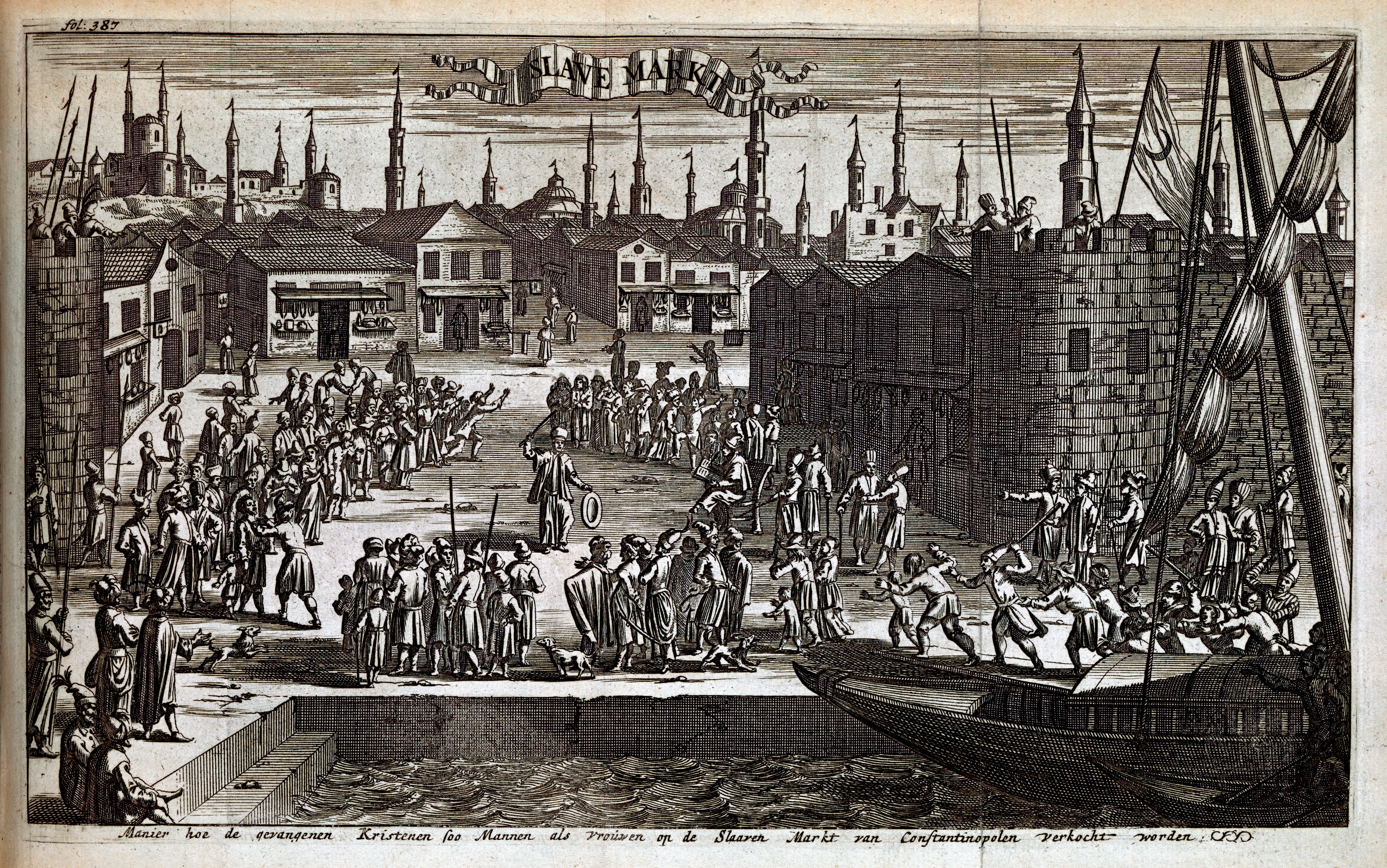
Slave market, 1684

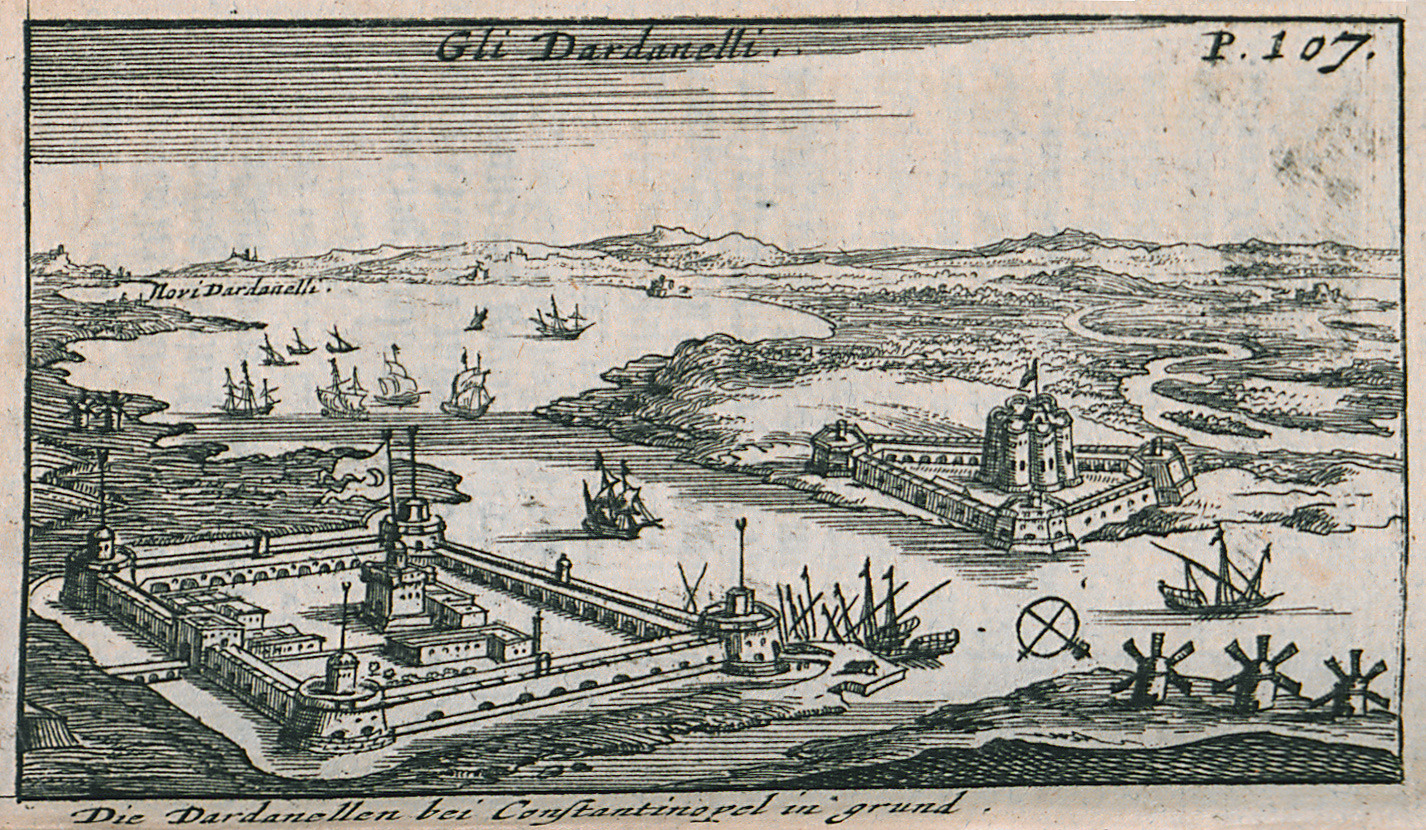
Dardanels, 1686

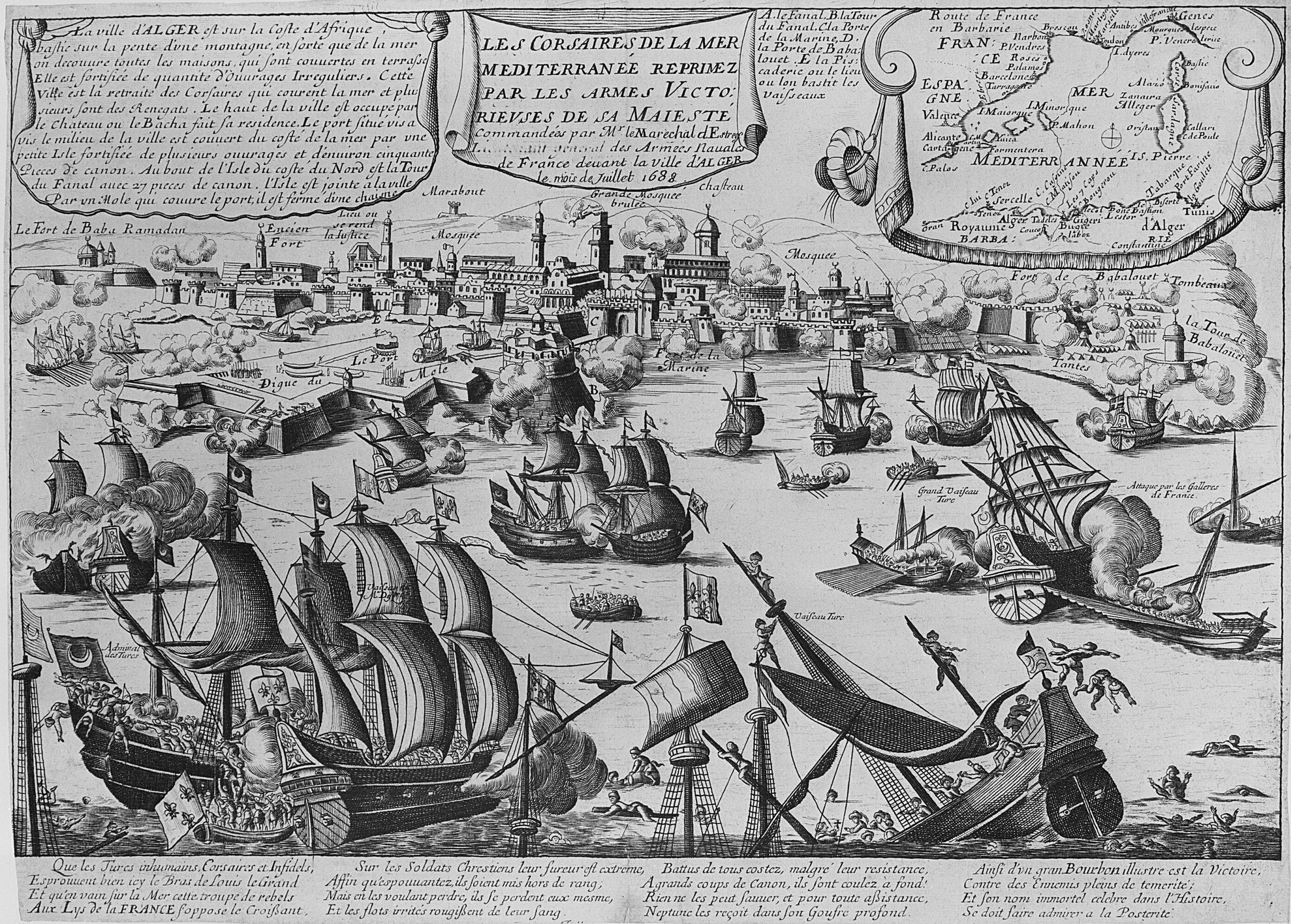
Alger, 1688–1700

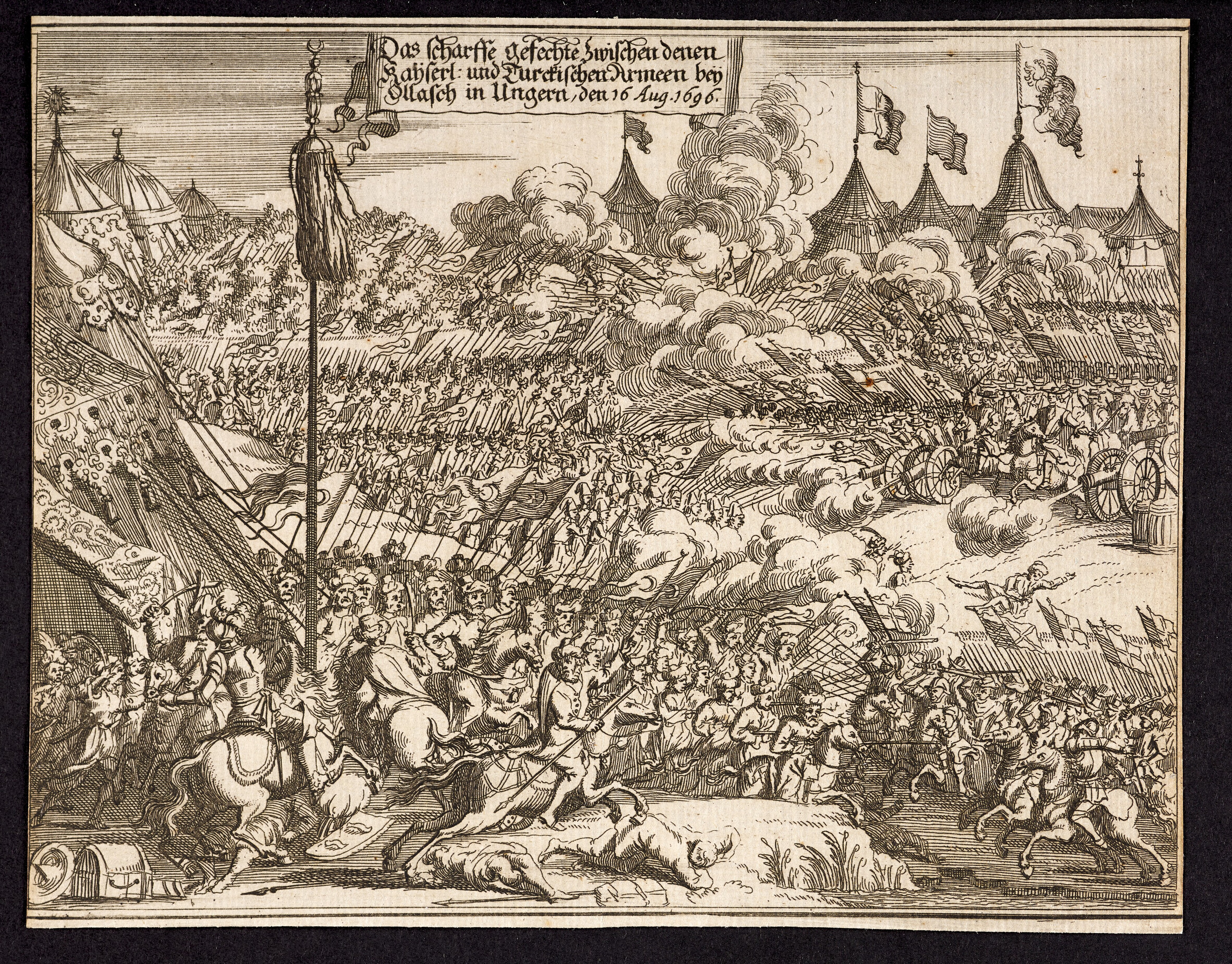
Ottoman flag in 1696

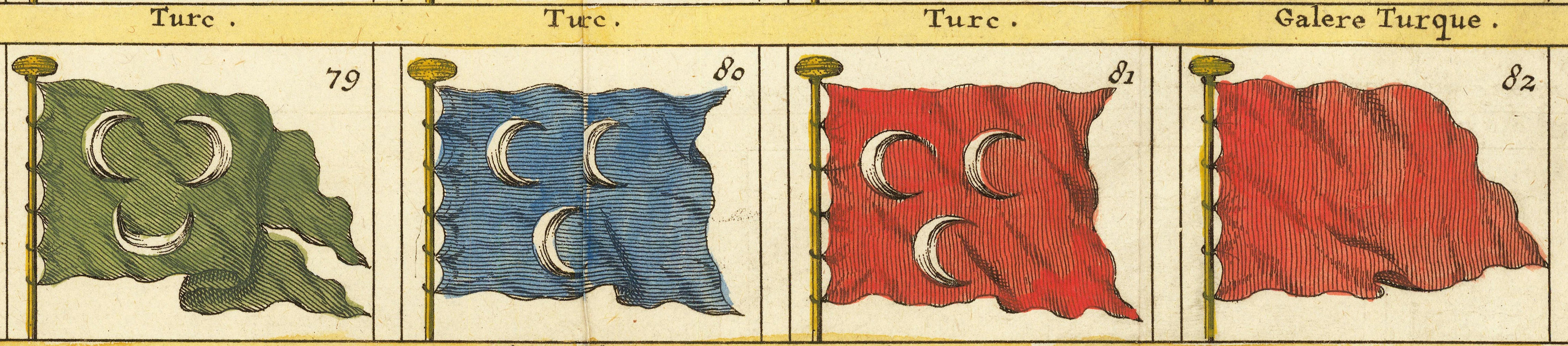
Ottoman Coat of Arms in 1720

=== Naval standards ===
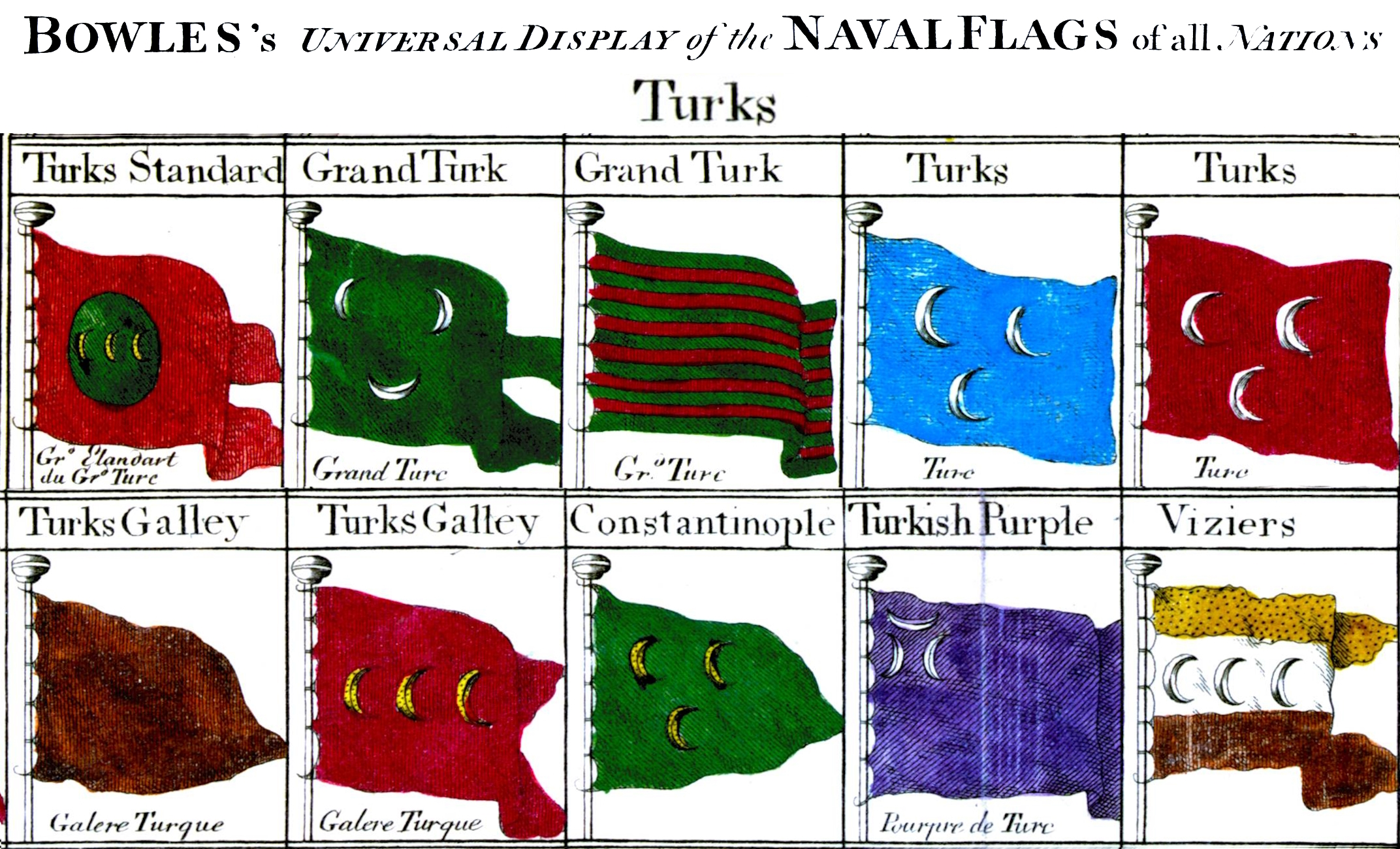
Ottoman naval flags according to Bowles's "Universal display of the naval flags of all nations in the world" (1783)

Numerous authors, especially in the 18th and 19th centuries reported on the variety of naval flags in the Ottoman Empire, starting with Bowles's "Universal display of the naval flags of all nations in the world" (1783). The designs of the flags depended on the rank or geographical base of their owners.

"Grand standard of the Grand Turk": one of the several types of Ottoman naval standards from 1686 to the 18th century.

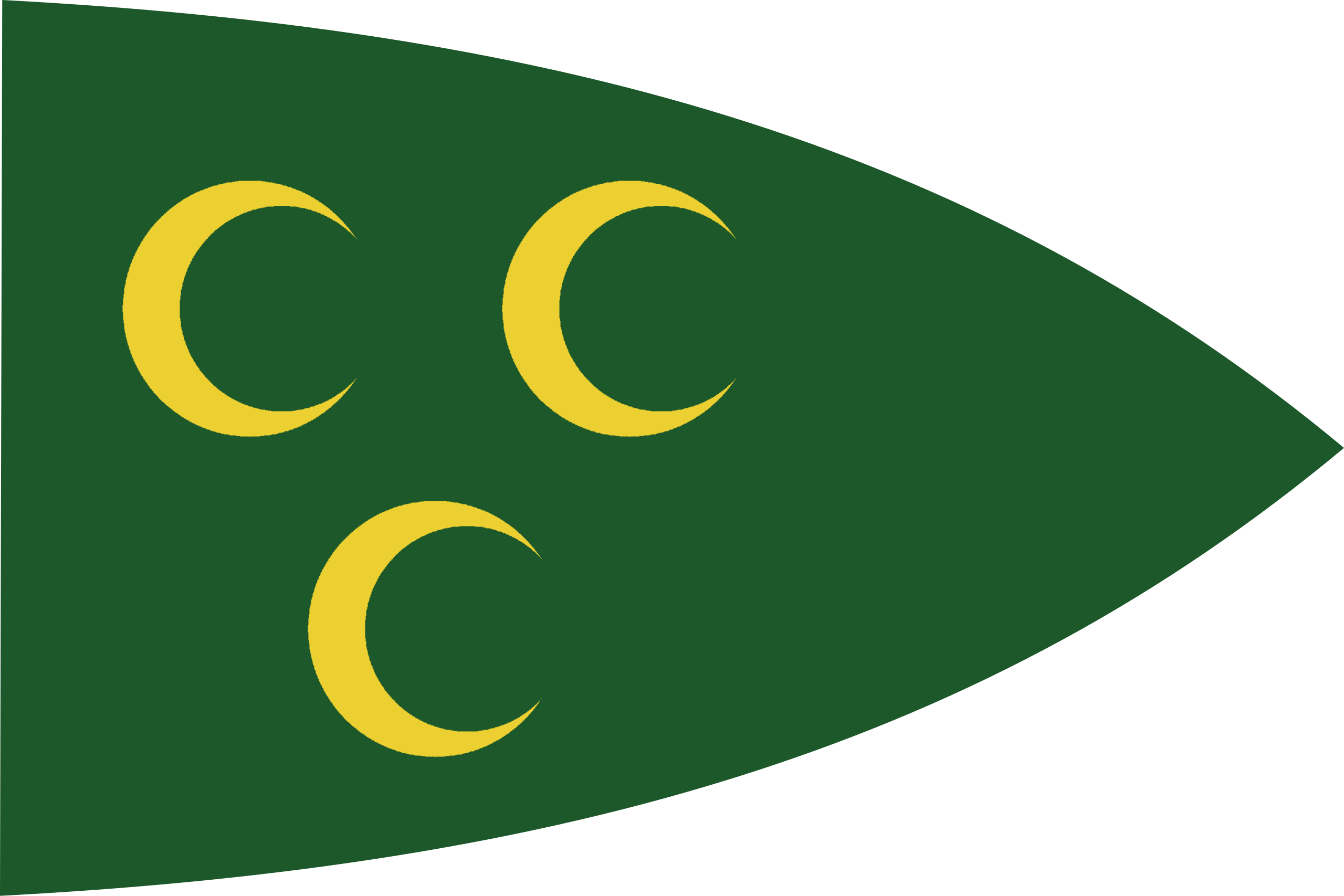
Naval flag of Constantinople, also in Bowles's Universal Display of the Naval Flags of all Nations (1783)

"Blue Turks' flag", also in Bowles's Universal Display of the Naval Flags of all Nations (1783)

"Turkish Purple flag", also in Bowles's Universal Display of the Naval Flags of all Nations (1783)

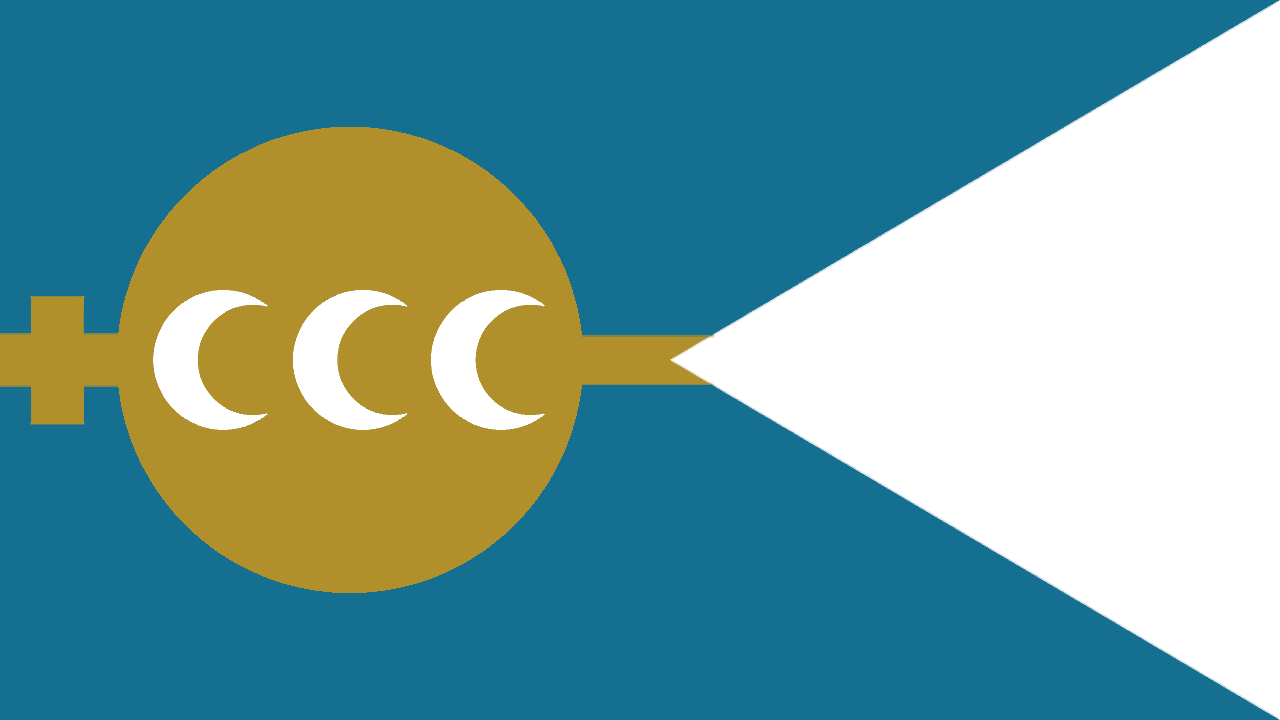
Ottoman bashaw flag 1718–1807 century

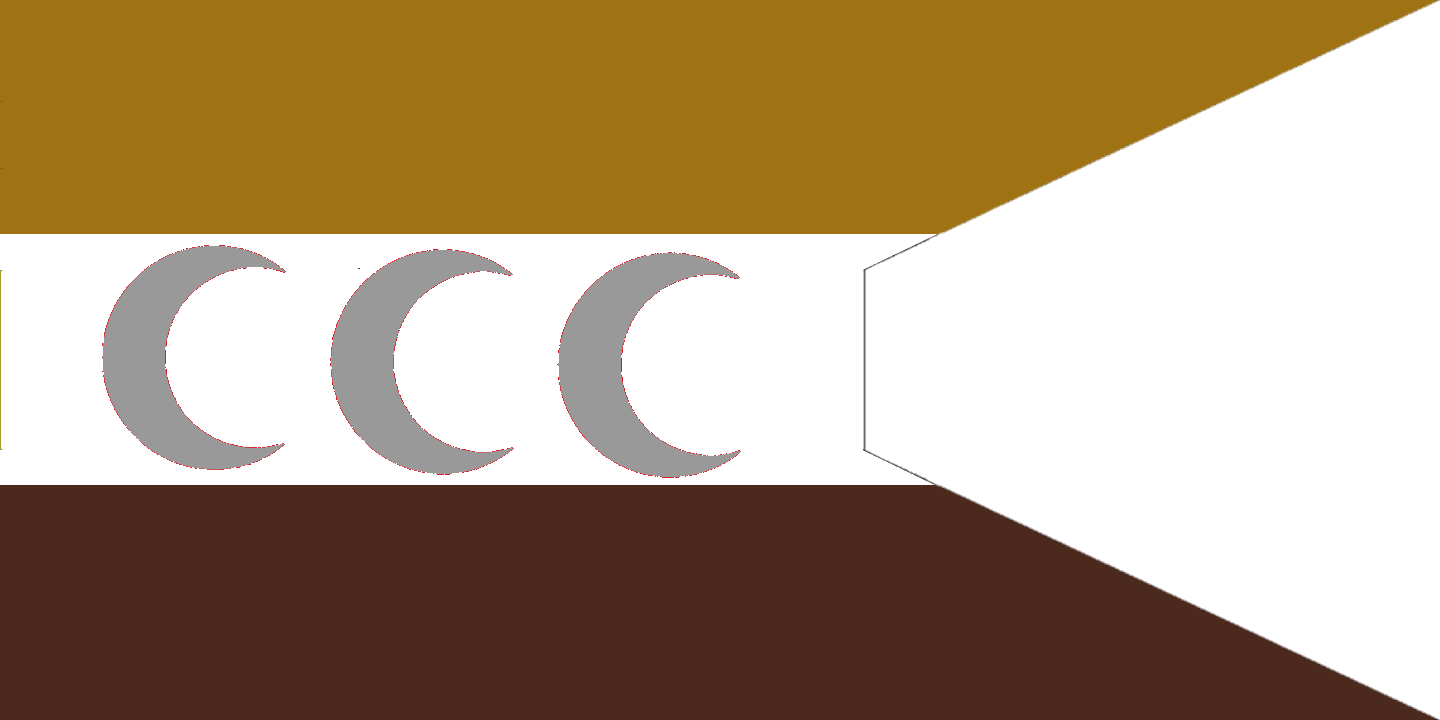
Turkish vizier flag according to Naval flags of the World, Bowles 1783

== Crescent and star flag ==
The official eight-pointed star flag used by the Ottoman Empire between 1793 and 1844 as the official state flag.

The star and crescent design is reported as early as 1526 at the Battle of Mohács, or the Siege of Wien in 1683, and continues to appear more systematically after 1793, on Ottoman flags of the 19th century. The white star and crescent moon with a red background was introduced as the flag of the Ottoman Empire in 1844.

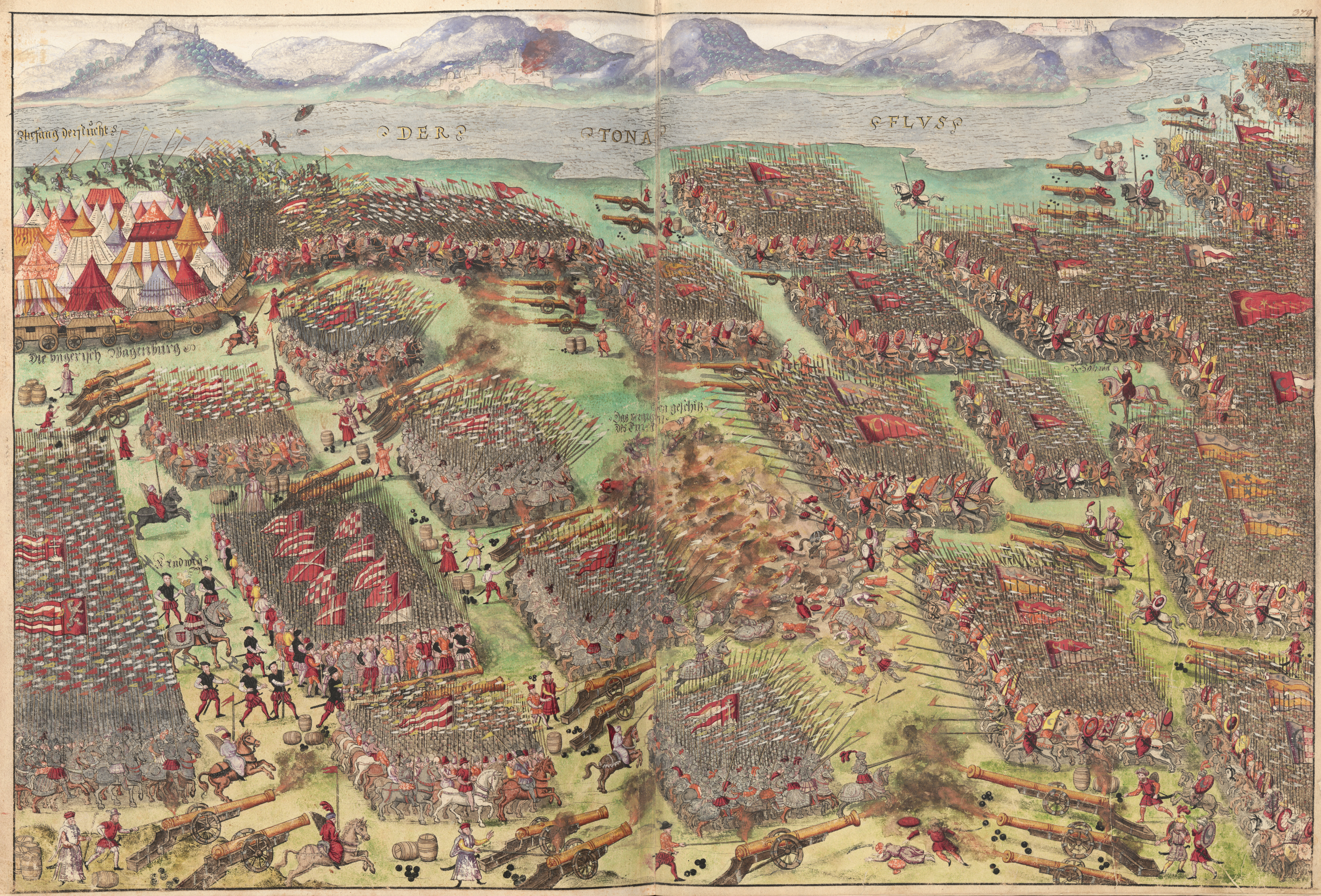
Battle of Mohács in 1526, by Johann Schreier (1555)

Siege of Wien, 1683

Army banner with crescent, as depicted in a 1721 illustration to 'Ata'i's Hamse

Crescent flag reported during the war with Austria in 1788 by Lucas Hochenleitter

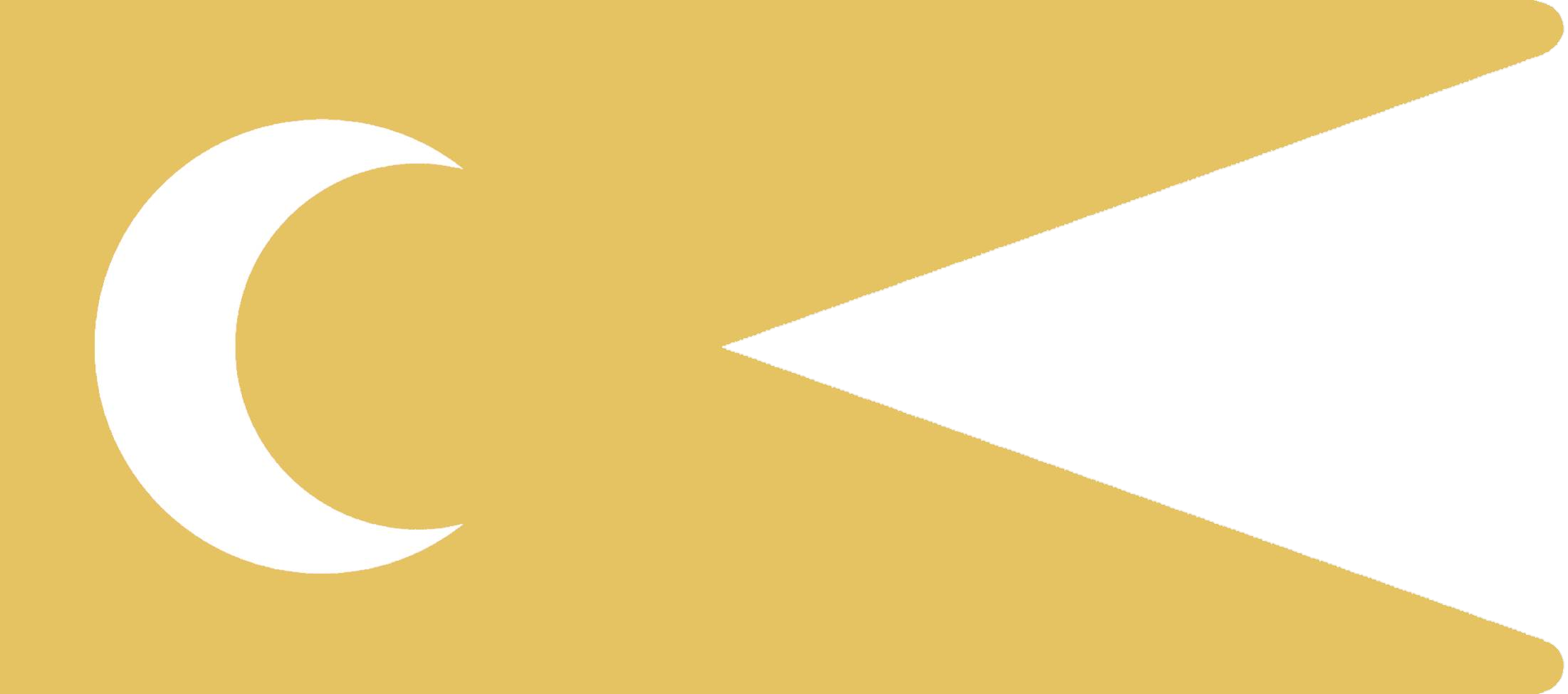
Flag used during the Siege of Vienna in 1683

Flag of Rumelia Eyalet (1365–1867)

=== Source of the Star and Crescent symbol ===
It has been suggested that the star-and-crescent used in Ottoman flags of the 19th century had been adopted from the Byzantine. Franz Babinger (1992) suggests this possibility, noting that the crescent alone has a much older tradition also with Turkic tribes in the interior of Asia. The crescent and star is found on the coinage of Byzantium since the 4th century BC and was depicted on Byzantine Empire's coins and shields of Christian warrior saints till the 13th century. Parsons (2007) notes that the star and crescent was not a widespread motive on the coinage of Byzantium at the time of the Ottoman conquest. Turkish historians tend to stress the antiquity of the crescent (not star-and-crescent) symbol among the early Turkic states in Asia.

== Imperial standards ==
Adopted in 1882, the coat of arms of the Ottoman Empire featured a green flag at left (representing the Rumelia Eyalet and other European eyalets) and red flag at right (representing the Anatolia Eyalet and the other Asian eyalets).

The imperial standard displayed the sultan's tughra, often on a pink or bright red background.

Imperial Standard of the Ottoman Sultan

Naval Standard of the Ottoman Sultan

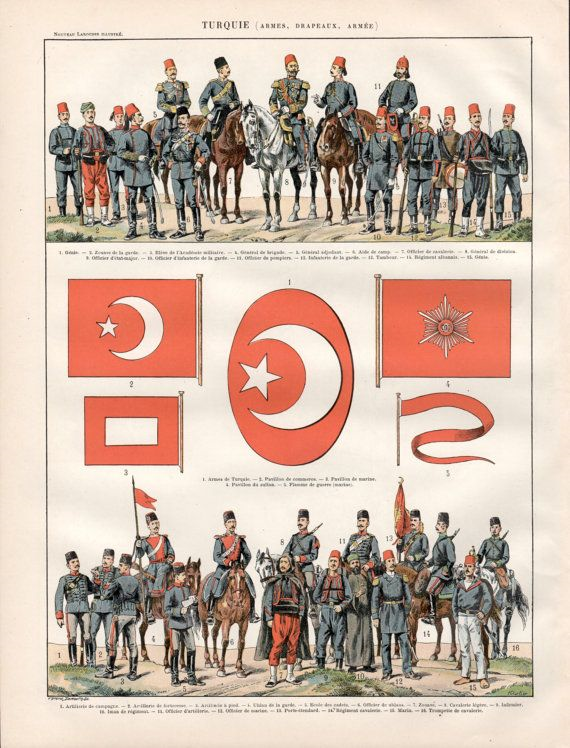
Standards used by the Ottoman Army in 1900

The standard used by the last Caliph, Abdulmejid II (between 19 November 1922 – 3 March 1924) consisted of a green flag with a star and crescent in white on a red oval background within a rayed ornament, all in white.

Caliphate Standard of Abdulmejid II

== Army Flags and Standards with Shahada ==
The Ottoman army often used verses from the Quran and Shahada on their flags. This tradition continued during the First World War. When Ottoman Turkey joined the war on the side of the Central Powers in 1914, it declared a jihad against the Entente States. The modern Ottoman Turkish army used the Ottoman state coat of arms on one side of their standard regimental flags and Shahada on the other. The Ottoman regimental flags consisted of gold writings and the state emblem on a red background. After the empire was abolished in 1922, this practice continued for a while in modern Turkey.

Standard of the Ottoman Army at Battle of Vienna (1683)

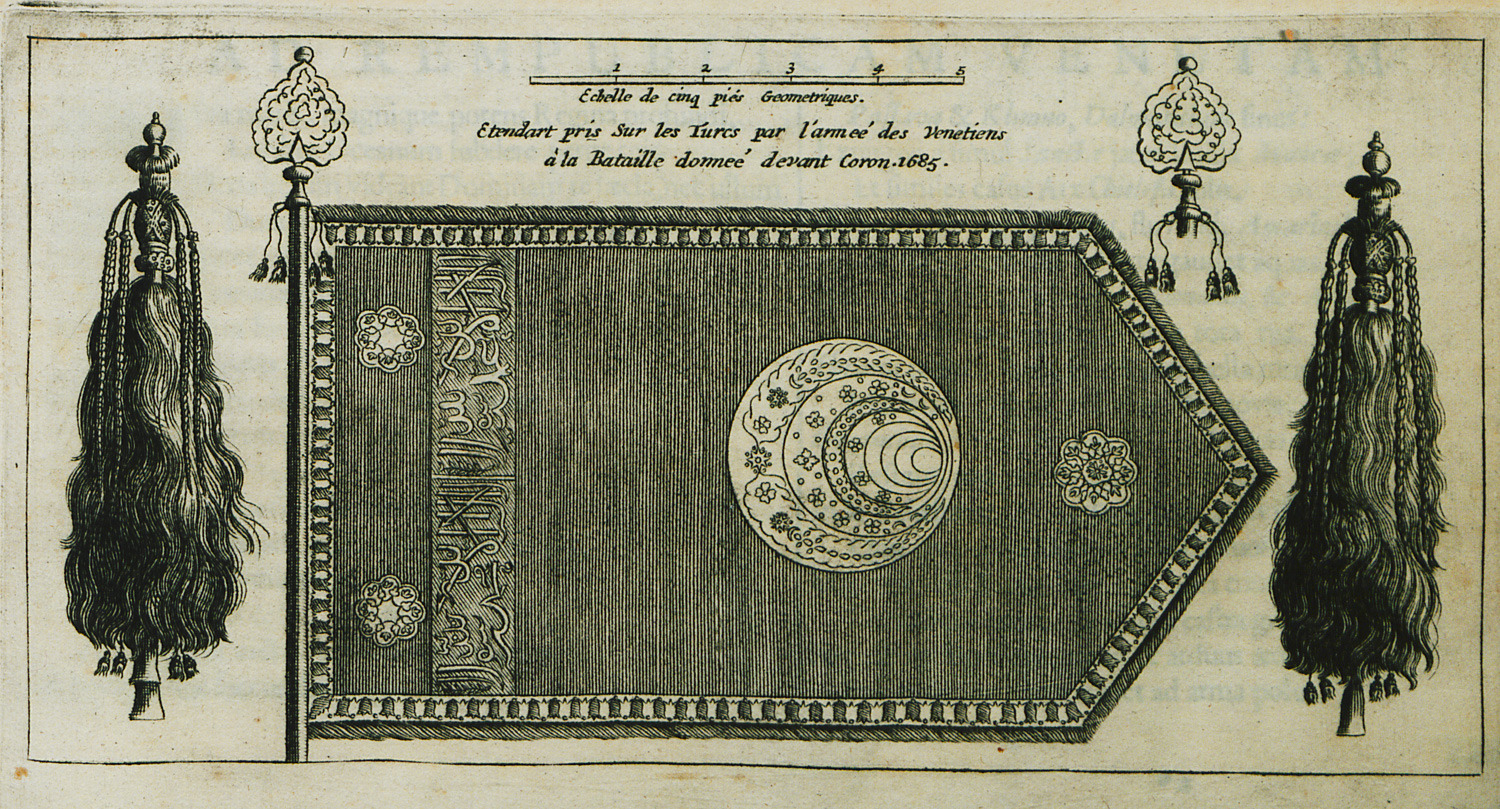
Ottoman Flag at Morea (1690)

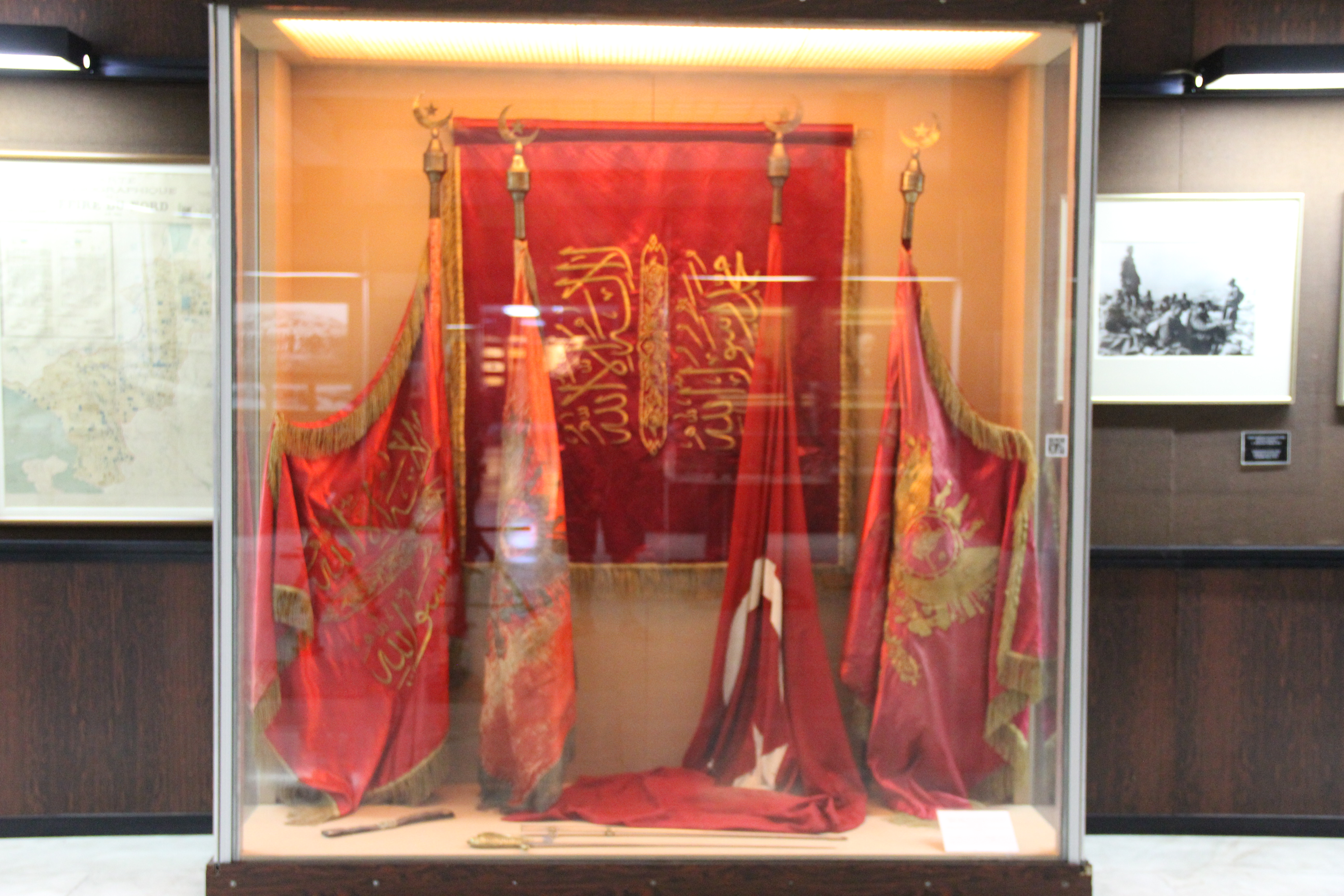
Ottoman Regimental Standards with Ottoman National Flag

One Side of Ottoman Turkish Regimental Standard with Shahada which was used in World War I (1914)

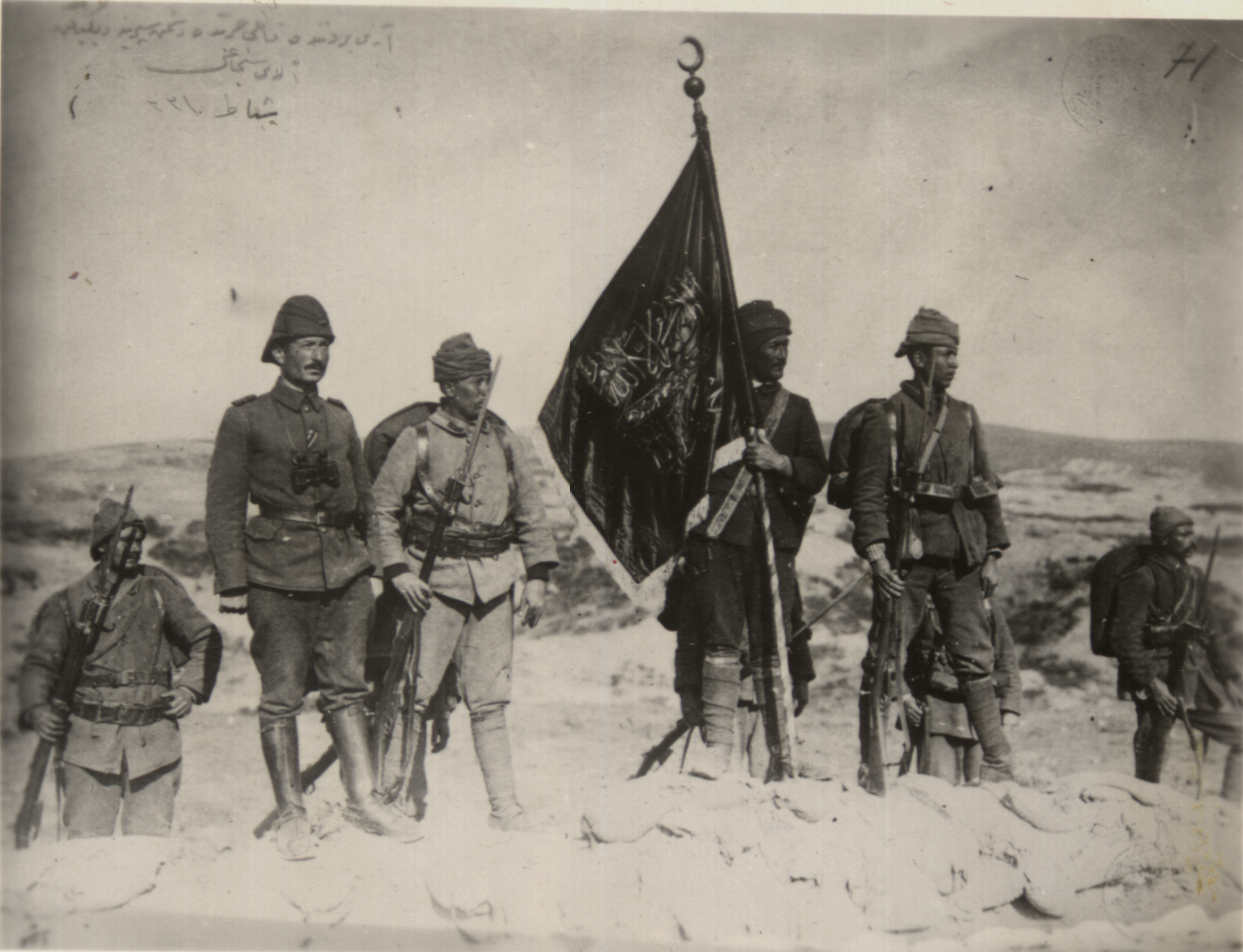
Ottoman Turkish Regimental Standard with Shahada in Gallipoli campaign (1915)

== See also ==
- Coat of arms of the Ottoman Empire
- Flag of Turkey
- List of Turkish flags
