= Italo Selvelli =

Italian composer

Italo Selvelli (10 November 1863 – 11 May 1918) was an Italian composer, pianist and orchestra director, who lived and worked in Constantinople during the last decades of the Ottoman Empire.

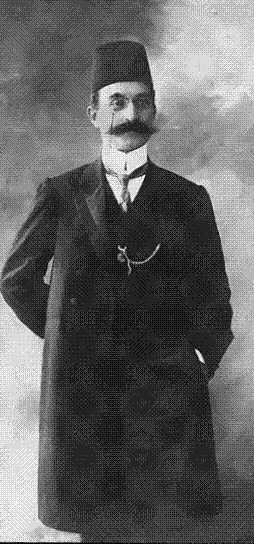
Italo Selvelli

== Biography ==
Italo Giovanni Selvelli was born in Constantinople in 1863. His parents were Michele Selvelli (Fano, Italy, 1825 - Istanbul, 1895) and Maria Sigalla (Syros, Greece, 1838 - Istanbul, 1904). Italo Selvelli attended the Royal College of Music of Palermo between 1876 and 1881.

Since 1887 he was active in conducting operas, operettas and ballets at the Nouveau Theatre and Concordia Theatre of Constantinople. Throughout his life he also practised as a music teacher for several members of the Ottoman aristocracy.

On 16 June 1889 he married Anna Maria Pussich (1866-1954) who gave him two sons and two daughters.

In 1891 Italo Selvelli was appointed director of the orchestra and the music school of Tophane, the first non-military band of the Ottoman Empire, founded by Zeki Pasha.

In 1909, when Sultan Reşâd came to the Imperial throne with the name of Mehmed V, an open competition was called for deciding the new official march of the Sultan. To be chosen was Italo Selvelli's polyphonic composition, since then known as the "Reşadiye Marşı" ("March of Mehmed V Resad"). This march was actually the last official personal march of a Sultan in the history of the Ottoman Empire, as the subsequent and final Sultan Mehmed VI, who ascended the throne in 1918 in a difficult political situation, refused to adopt a personal march.

Italo Selvelli died on 11 May 1918, most likely from an anthrax infection. He is buried in the Osmanbey Christian Cemetery of Istanbul.

== Bibliography ==
- Aksoy Bülent, Avrupalı Gezginlerin Gözüyle Osmanlılarda Musıki, Pan Yayıncılık, Istanbul 2003
- Gazimihal Mahmud Ragıp, Musıki Sözlüğü, Millî Eğitim Basımevi, Istanbul 1961
- Feldman Walter, Music of the Ottoman Court, Verlag für Wissenschaft und Bildung, Berlin 1996
- Özalp Mehmet Nazmi, Türk Mûsikîsi Tarihi I-II, Milli Eğitim Bakanlığı Yayınları, Istanbul 2000
- Uçan Ali, Türk Müzik Kültürü, Evrensel Müzikevi, Ankara 2005
- Booklet of CD “Osmanli Marslari-The Ottoman Military Music in 78 rpm Records”, Kalan 1999
- Booklet of CD “An Album of Turkish History for the Piano” performed by Aydin Karlibel, Kalan 2002
- Levantine Musicians in Music Culture of Ottoman Empire

== Other sources ==
- Archives of the Osmanbey Cemetery of Istanbul
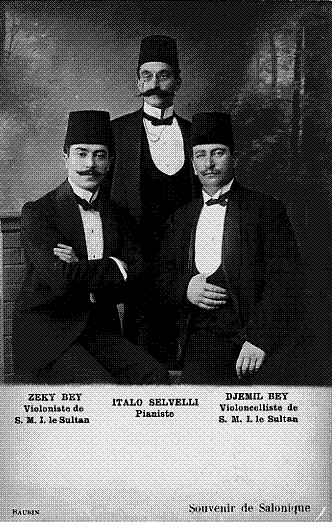

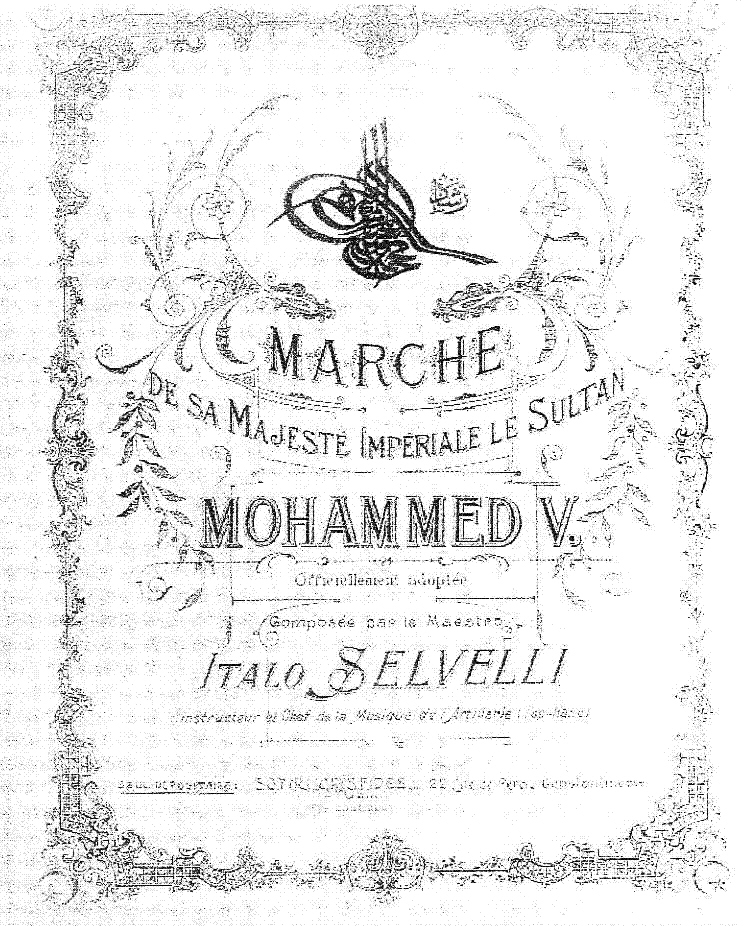
