= Giuseppe Donizetti =

Italian musician (1788–1856)

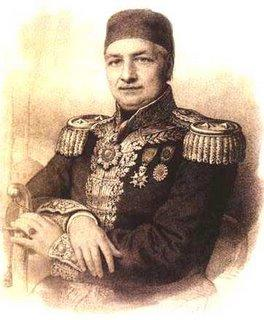
Giuseppe Donizetti in Ottoman court uniform

Giuseppe Donizetti (6 November 1788 – 12 February 1856), also known as Donizetti Pasha, was an Italian composer. From 1828 he was Instructor General of the Imperial Ottoman Music at the court of Sultan Mahmud II (r. 1808–1839). He was replaced by Guatelli Pasha after his death.

His younger brother was the opera composer Gaetano Donizetti. He studied music first with his uncle, Carini Donizetti, and, later, he was a pupil of Simone Mayr. After enlisting in Napoleon's army (1808), he served there as band leader. He took part in the campaigns against Austria and in Spain, and followed Napoleon to Elba. He was present at the Battle of Waterloo. After the fall of Napoleon, he continued his career as a bandmaster in the Savoy army. A few years later, he was invited to serve the Ottoman Empire by Giovanni Timoteo Calosso, a fellow Sardinian.

Donizetti Pasha, as he was called in the Ottoman Empire, played a significant role in the introduction of European music to the Ottoman military. Apart from overseeing the training of the European-style military bands of Mahmud's modern army, he taught music at the palace to the members of the Ottoman royal family, the princes and the ladies of the harem, is believed to have composed the first national anthem of the Ottoman Empire, supported the annual Italian opera season in Pera, organised concerts and operatic performances at court, and played host to a number of eminent virtuosi who visited Istanbul at the time, such as Franz Liszt, Parish Alvars and Leopold de Meyer. Although the elder Donizetti was born in Bergamo, Italy, Istanbul became a second home for him, and he lived there until his death in 1856. He is buried in the vaults of the St. Esprit Cathedral, near the Beyoğlu district of Istanbul, in Pera.

Emre Aracı published a comprehensive biography of Giuseppe Donizetti in Turkish in 2007. The volume Giuseppe Donizetti Pasha: Musical and Historical Trajectories between Italy and Turkey, edited by Federico Spinetti, was published in English and Italian by the Fondazione Donizetti in 2010.

== Sources ==
- Ashbrook, William (1982), Donizetti and his Operas, Cambridge:Cambridge University Press. ISBN 0-521-27663-2 ISBN 0-521-23526-X
- The Musical Times: A Levantine life: Giuseppe Donizetti at the Ottoman court
- Giuseppe Donizetti Pasha: Musical and Historical Trajectories between Italy and Turkey / Giuseppe Donizetti Pascià: Traiettorie musicali e storiche tra Italia e Turchia. Edited by Federico Spinetti . Bergamo, Fondazione Donizetti, 2010.
- Maurizio Costanza, La Mezzaluna sul filo - La riforma ottomana di Mahmud II, Marcianumpress, Venezia 2010.
- Weinstock, Herbert (1963), Donizetti and the World of Opera in Italy, Paris and Vienna in the First Half of the Nineteenth Century, New York: Random House.
