= Coat of arms of the Ottoman Empire =

Overview of coat of arms used in the Ottoman Empire

- Armiger: Sultan Abdul Hamid II
- Adopted: 1882
- Order: Medals of five of the Ottoman decorations
- Other elements: Cornucopia, anchor, weapons, and scale
- Use: Ottoman dynasty

Every sultan of the Ottoman Empire had his own monogram, called the tughra, which served as a royal symbol. A coat of arms in the European heraldic sense was created in the late 19th century. Hampton Court requested from the Ottoman Empire a coat of arms to be included in their collection. As the coat of arms had not been previously used in the Ottoman Empire, it was designed following this request of Mahmud II, and the final design was adopted by Sultan Abdul Hamid II on 17 April 1882.

== Design ==
At the heart of the design is a shield adorned with a turban, which serves as the "crown" of the Ottoman monarch. Above the shield, a sun symbolizes the grandeur of the nation, upon which the sultan's tughra and chosen motto are inscribed. To the left, a red book and a green book represent the Islamic and modern laws of the empire. Atop these books, a scale stands as a symbol of justice. The blooming flowers near it also represents justice in Islamic symbolism. Encircling the shield are an assortment of weapons, balancing ancient armaments with modern weaponry. A red flag representing the secular institutions of the state stands alongside the green Standard of the Caliph. Beyond the coat, the Ottoman Orders of Merit are displayed.

At the top, golden light rays radiate from the sun with the tughra seal of the sultan inscribed in golden letters on a green disk background. The tughra reads in Arabic, "Mahmud Khan son of Abdulhamid, forever victorious", written out as: محمود خان بن عبد الحميد مظفر دائماً (Mahmūd Ḫān bin Abdulhamīd muẓaffar dāʾimā). The inscription in the large green crescent reads in Arabic: "Relying on Divine success, the king of the Sublime Ottoman State", written out as: المستند بالتوفيقات الربانية ملك الدولة العلية العثمانية (al-Mustanidu bi't-Tawfiqāti'r-Rabbānīyah Malik ad-Dawlatu'l-Alīyati'l-Uthmāniyah).

Hanging beneath the lower flourish are the medals of five Ottoman military decorations. In the main image, from left to right they are: the Order of Charity, the Order of the Medjidie, the Order of the Crescent, the Order of Osmanieh, and the Order of Distinction. Other than the number of medals, the arrangement and type of medals featured were never standardised.

In keeping with the Islamic proscription against depicting animate beings, no animals such as supporters are included in the design.

== Symbols ==
The symbols in the coat of arms represent the following:

- Green flag of Ottoman Caliphate on the left,
- Red flag of the state on the right,
- Elaborate turban above the central shield represents the Emperor who unites the different aspects of the empire under him,
- Elliptical shield with a stylized Sun motif in the middle represents the greatness of the state,
- Flowers on the left symbolize justice in islamic symbolism,
- Weight balance on the left symbolizes the justice of the Ottomans,
- Books on the left under the balance are the ahkam-i şer'iyye (book of sharia law) and the nizamiyeyi cami kitab (book of modern law),
- Weapons on the left and right symbolize the Ottoman military, with the anchor on the left representing the Ottoman Navy and the Ottoman Cannon on the right,
- Green medallion on the Sun with the sultan's seal (tughra) within symbolizes the sultan,
- Green hilal (crescent) below the tughra, holds the chosen motto of the sultan. The crescent itself is recognised as one of the symbols of Islam.
- Various medals are hanging from the flourish.

== Different designs ==
There are several different versions of the 1882 coat of arms. Below are some examples found in various parts of the former Empire:

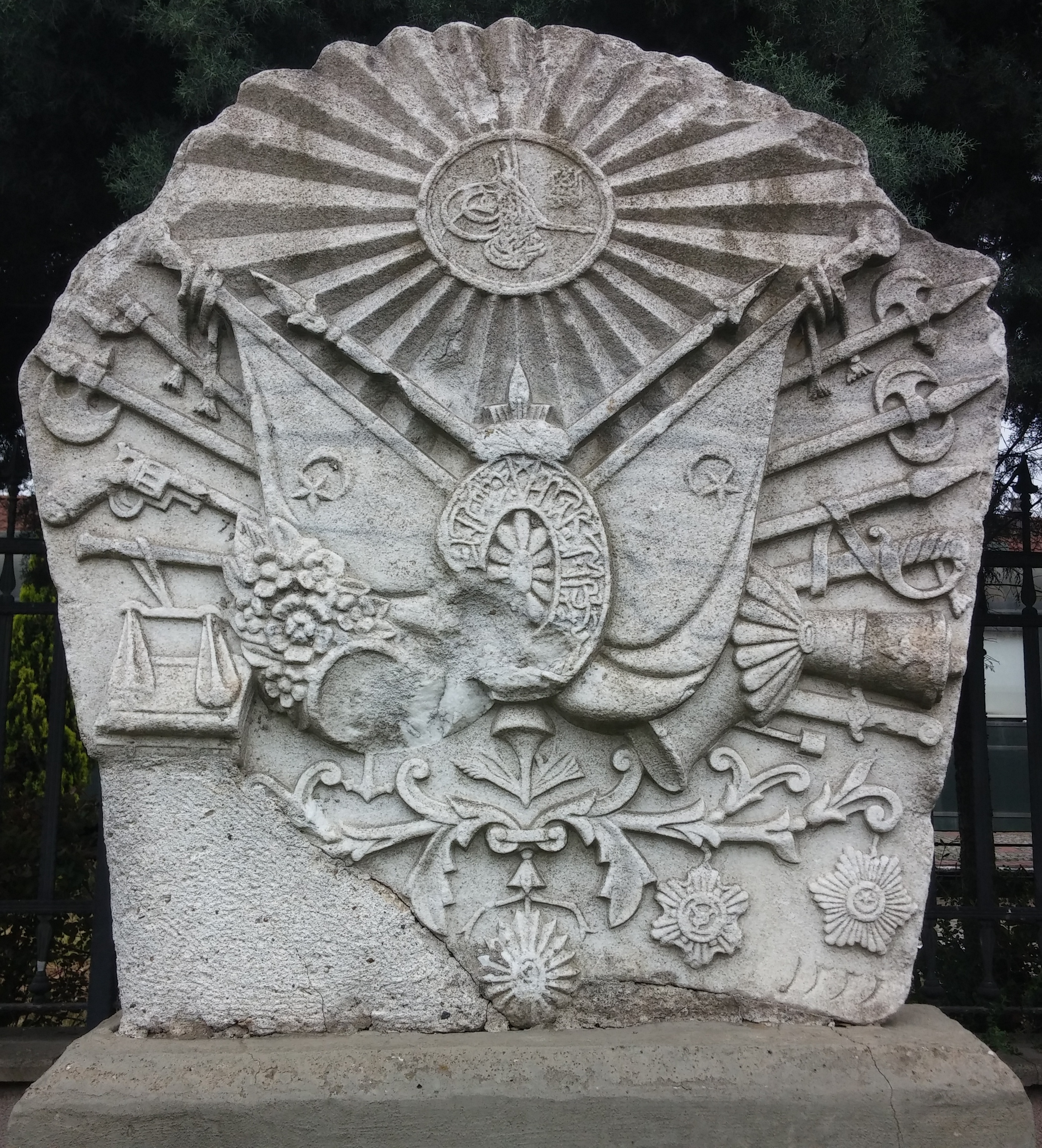
As displayed in a museum in Kocaeli

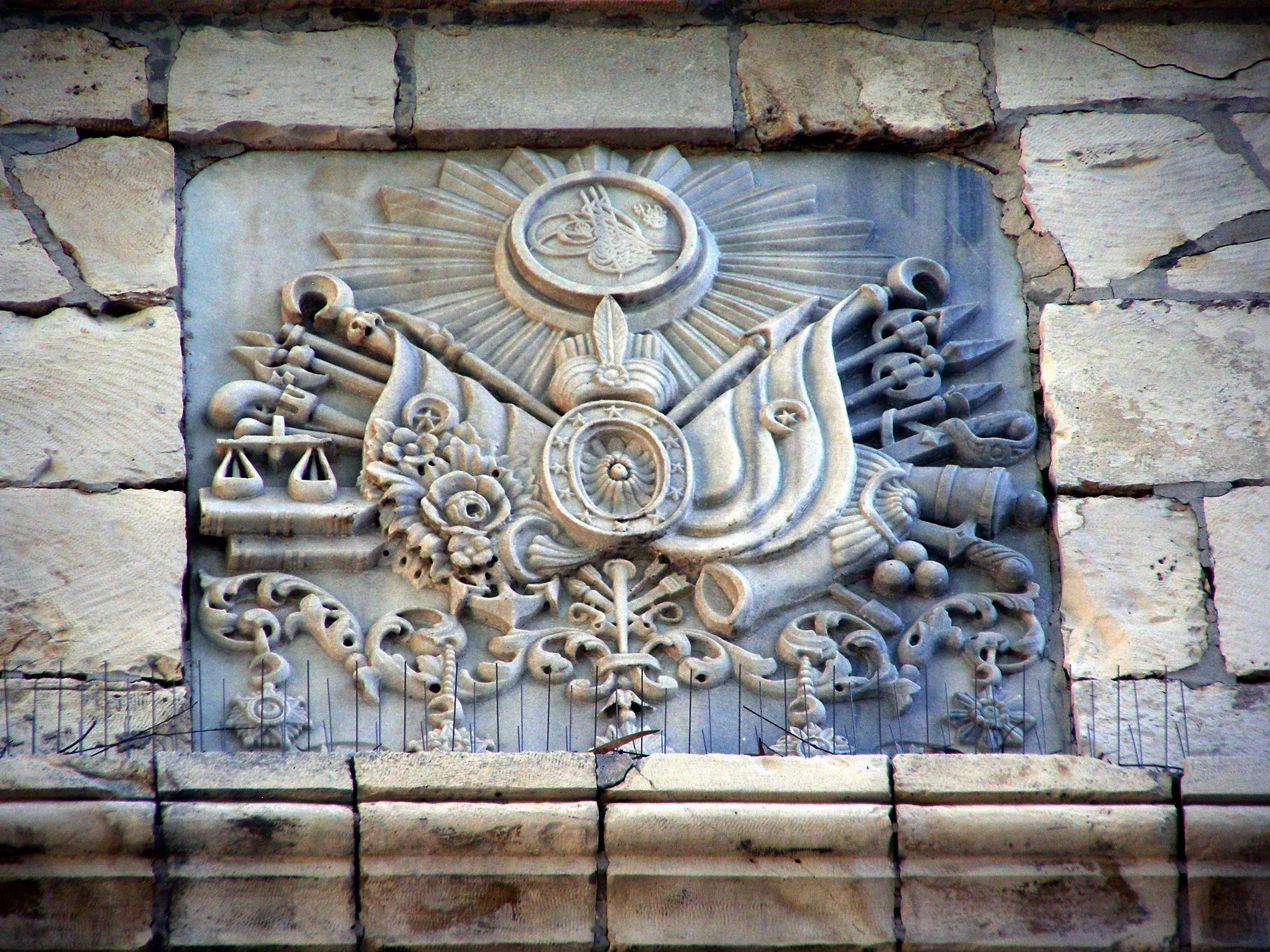
At the old municipal hospital in Jaffa Street, Jerusalem

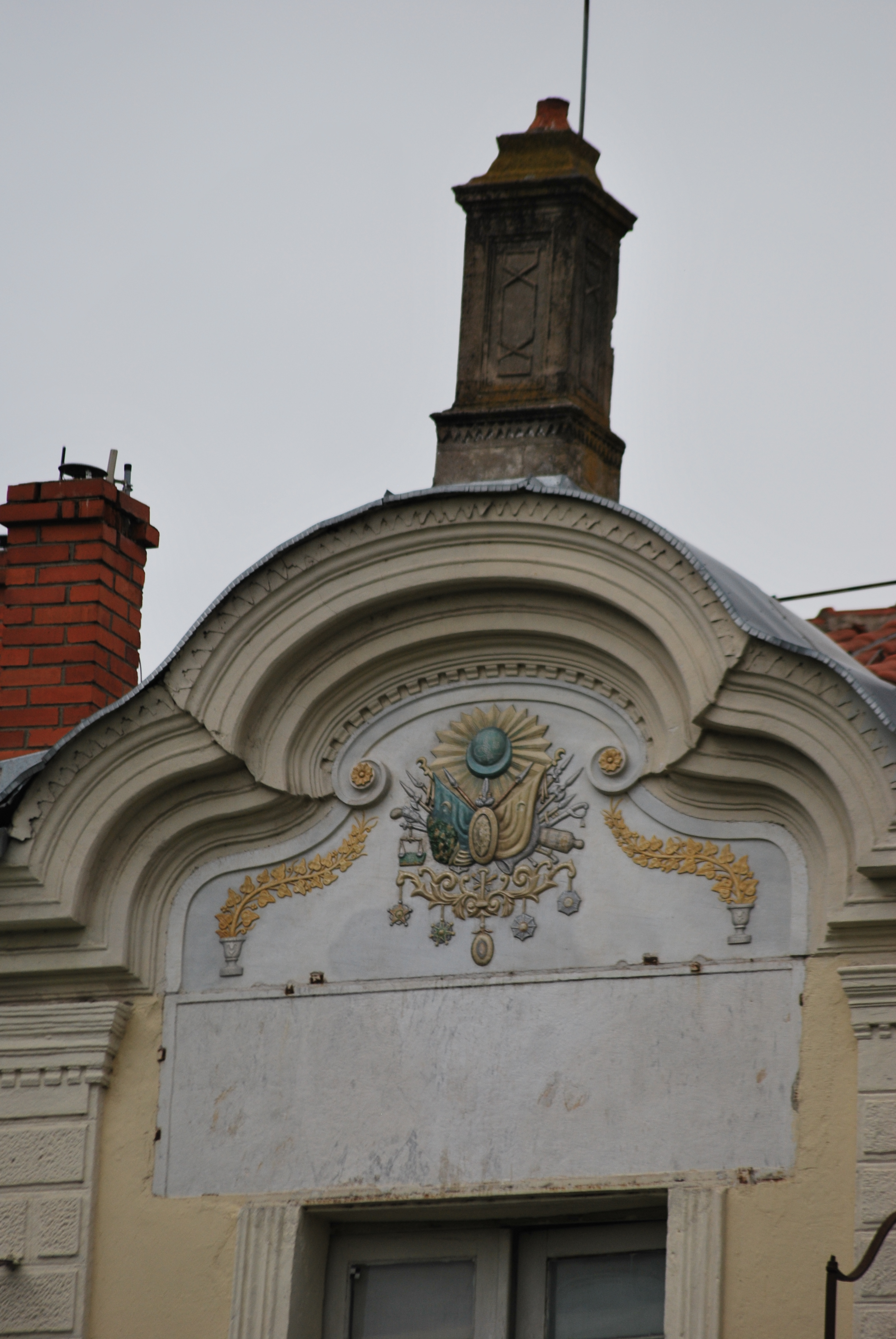
In Bitola, North Macedonia (formerly Manastır)

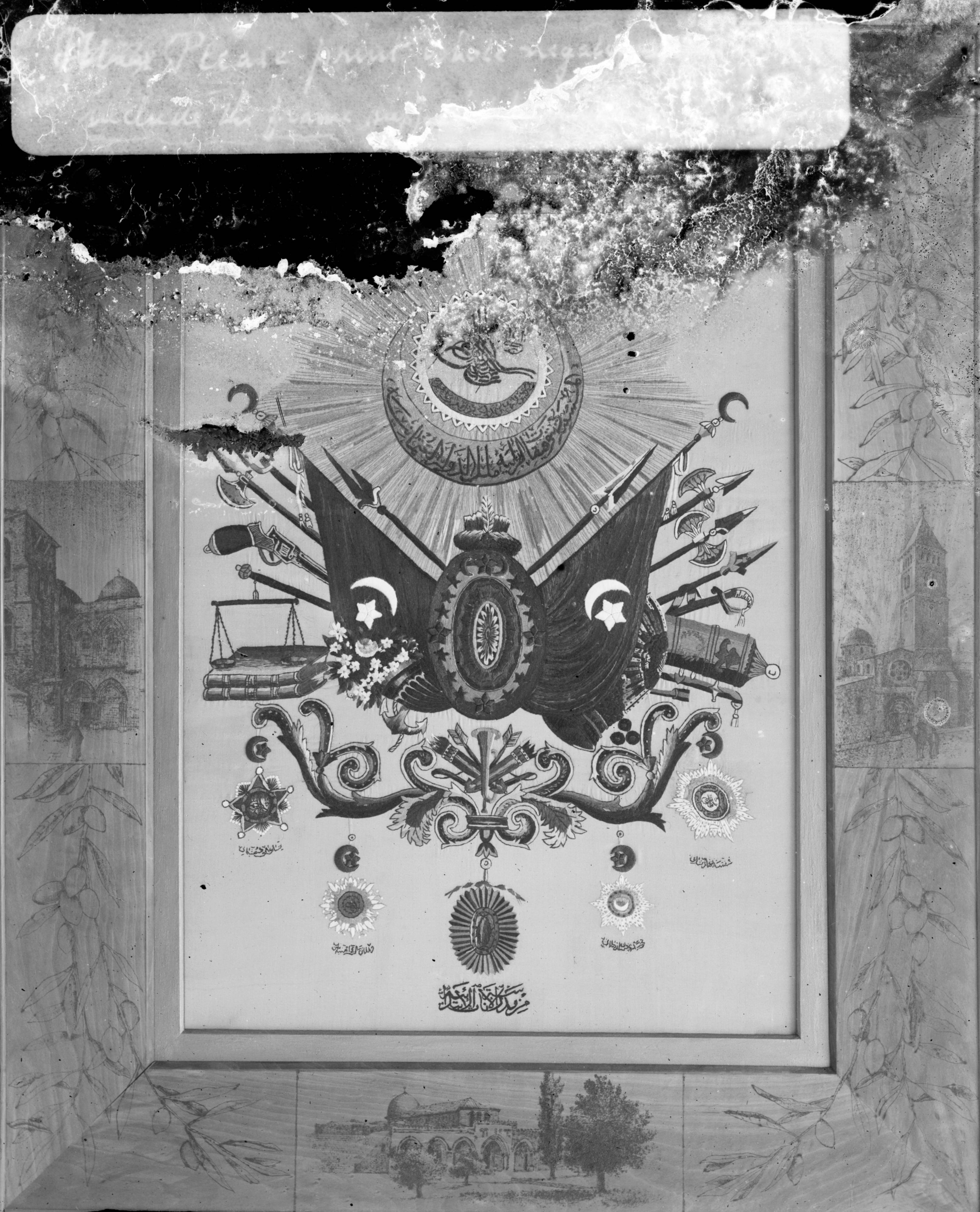
As presented to Kaiser Wilhelm II on the occasion of his state visit to the Ottoman Empire in Jerusalem, 1898

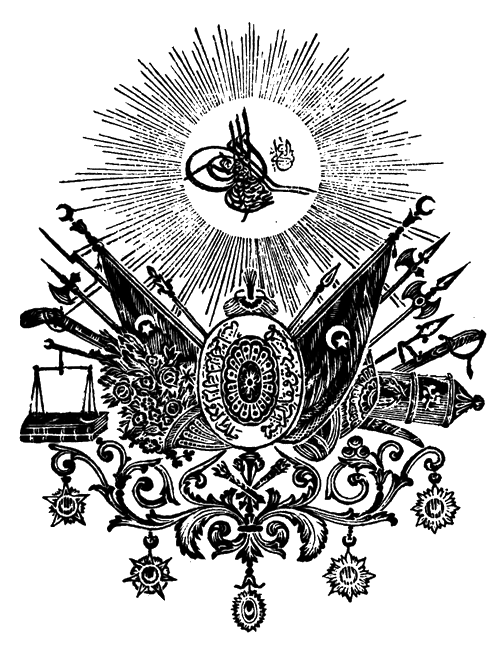
From the Yearbook of the Ottoman Ministry of Foreign Affairs

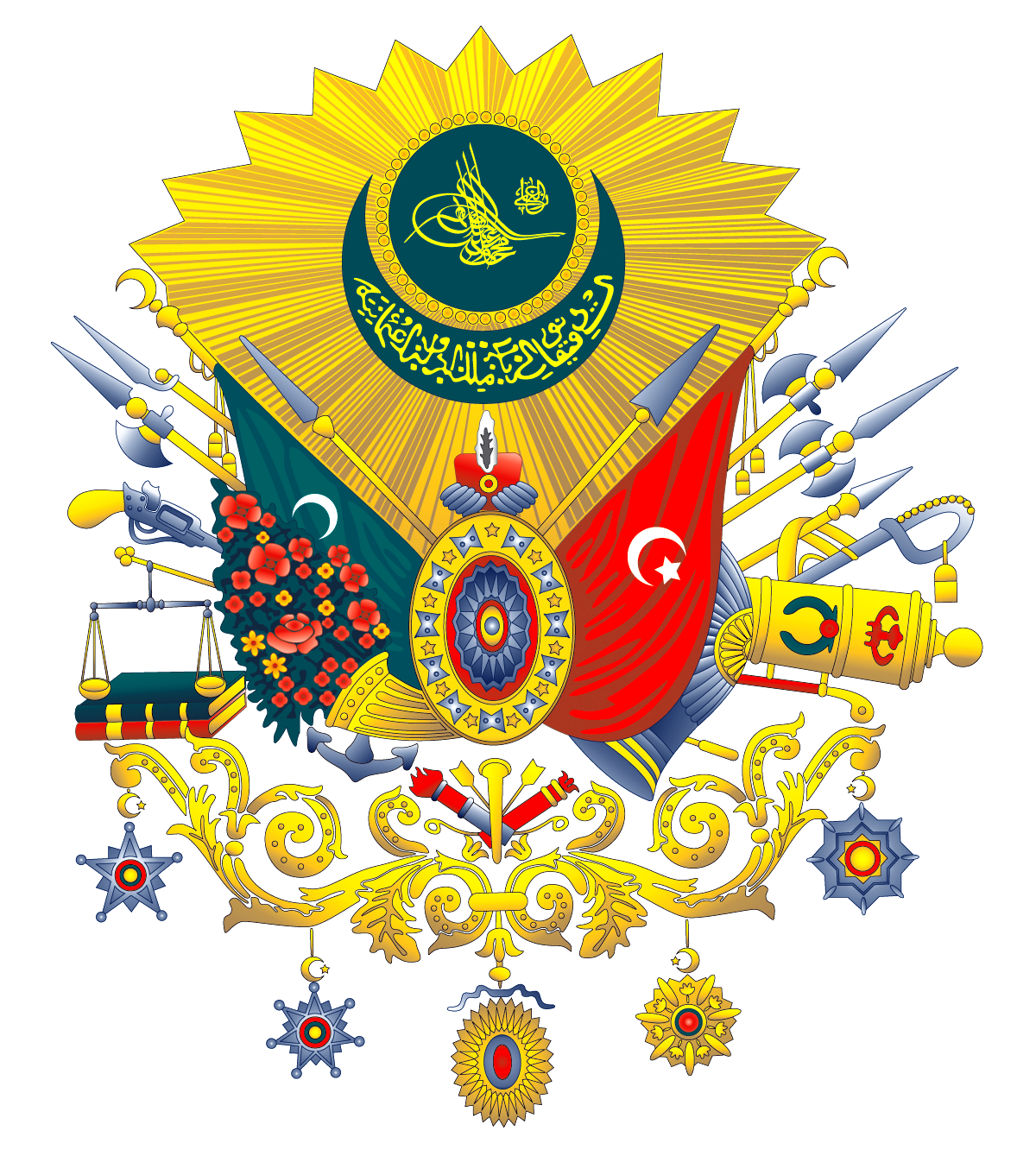

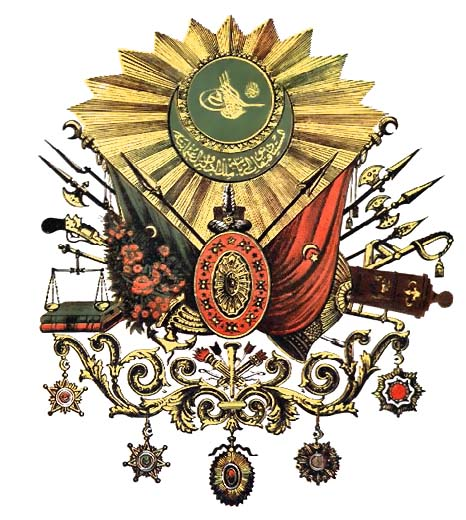

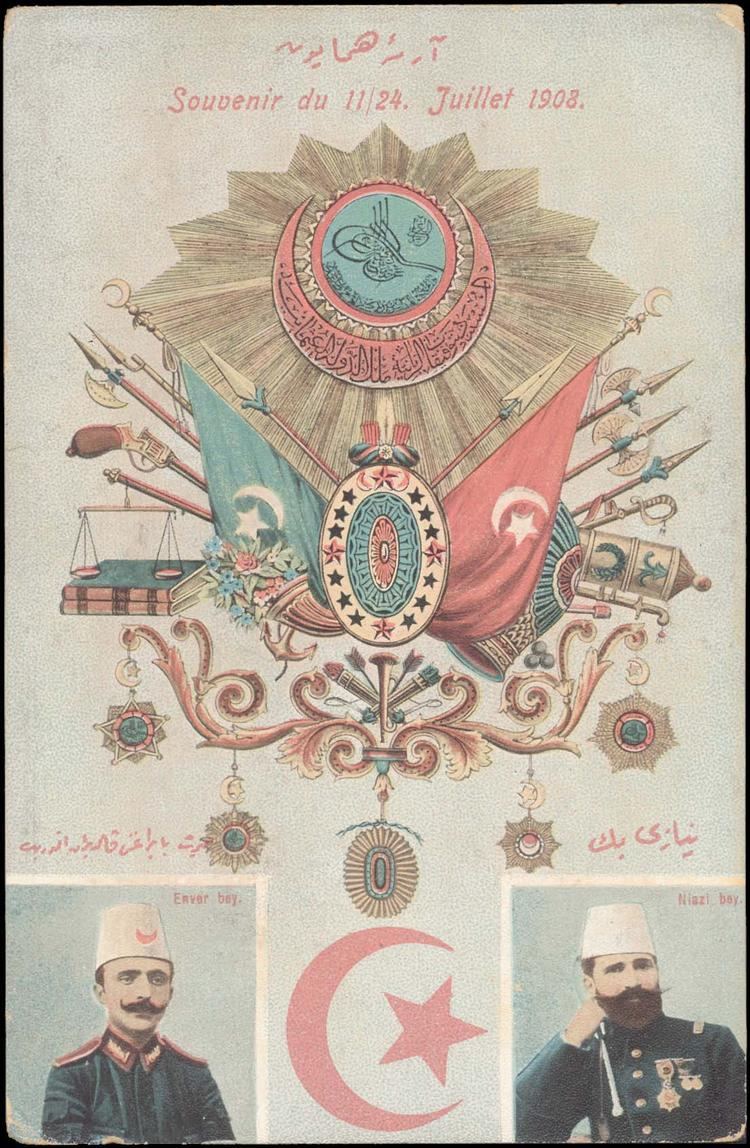
Enver bey and Niyazi bey postcard, 1908

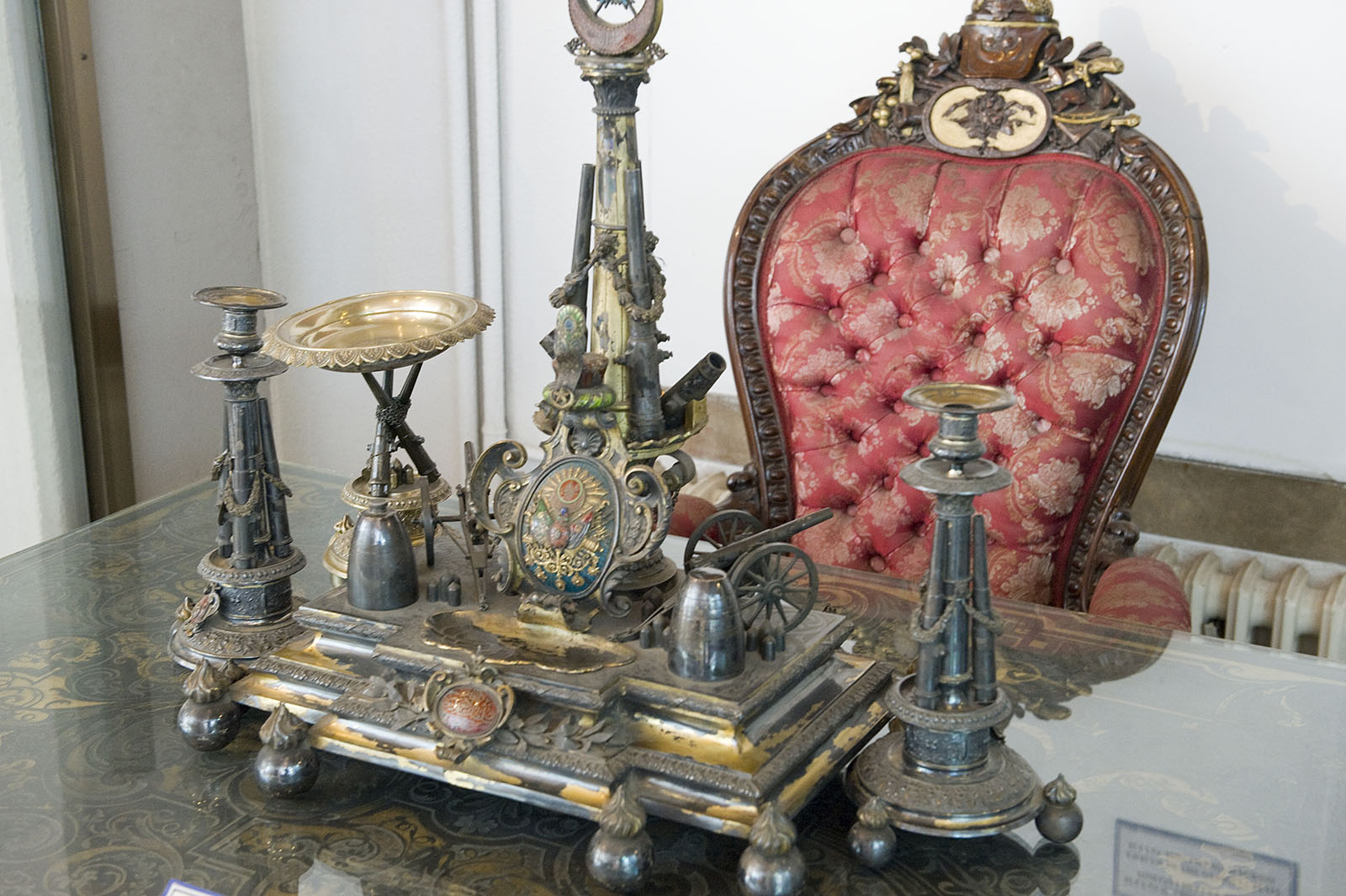
Desk of Sultan Abdulhamid II

== Coats of arms of the provinces and the government ==
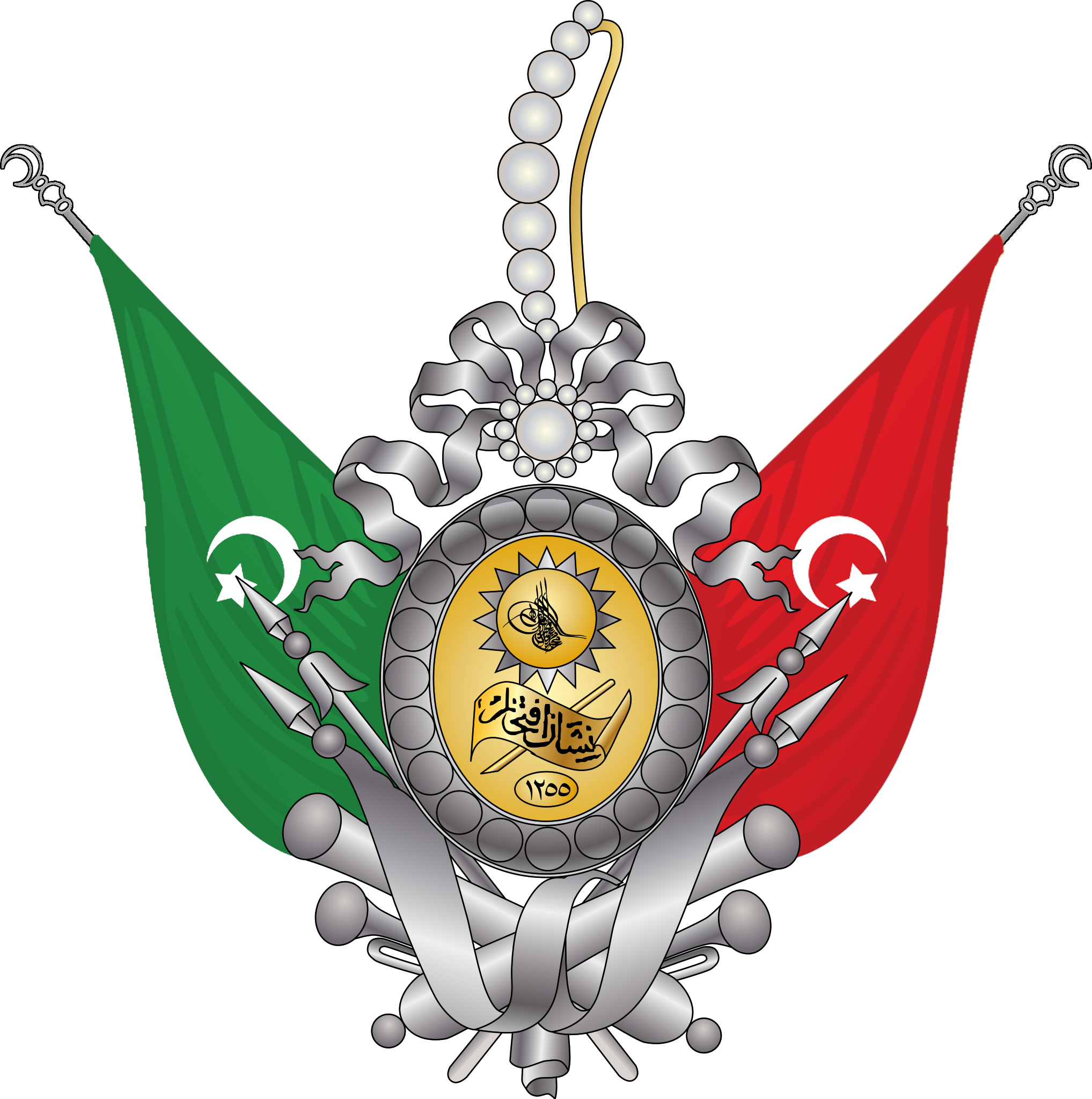
Seal of The Ottoman Vizier

Coat of Arms of Abdülmecid II, the last Caliph of The Ottoman Caliphate

Coat of arms of the Regency of Algiers (????–1830)

Coat of arms of the Regency of Algiers (1710-1830)

Coat of arms of the Regency of Algiers (Likely the official one)

Coat of arms of the Eyalet of Cyprus (1571–1878)

Coat of arms of the Egypt Eyalet (1854–1867)

Coat of arms of the Khedivate of Egypt (1867–1914)

Coat of arms of the Principality of Samos (1834–1912)

Coat of arms of the Cretan State (1898–1913)

Ottoman Tripolitania (1864–1911)

Coat of arms of the Beylik of Tunis (19th century)

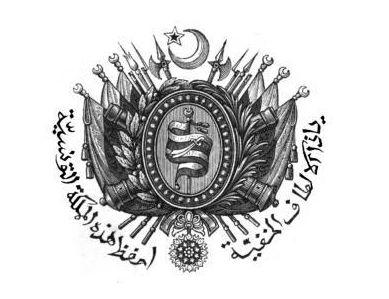
Husseinic coat of arms in 1858

Husseinic coat of arms in 1900

Coat of arms of the Eyalet of Tunis

== Pre-1882 coats of arms ==
1846-1882

== See also ==
- Flags of the Ottoman Empire
- National emblem of Turkey
- Islamic flags
