= Ancient Macedonians =

Ancient Greek ethnic group

Macedonians
Μακεδόνες Makedónes
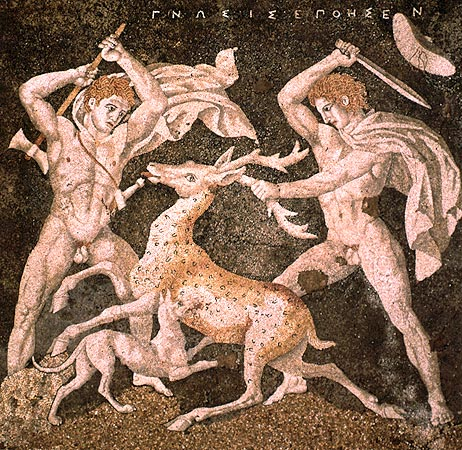
- Stag Hunt Mosaic, 4th century BC

Languages
- Ancient Macedonian, then Attic Greek, and later Koine Greek

Religion
- Ancient Greek religion

The Macedonians (Ancient Greek: Μακεδόνες, romanized: Makedónes) were an ancient tribe that lived on the alluvial plain around the rivers Haliacmon and lower Axios in the northeastern part of mainland Greece. Essentially an ancient Greek people, they established the kingdom of Macedon ruled from Aigai by the Argeads, and gradually expanded from their homeland along the Haliacmon valley on the northern edge of the Greek world, absorbing or driving out neighbouring non-Greek tribes, primarily Thracian and Illyrian. They spoke Ancient Macedonian, which is usually classified as a dialect of Northwest Greek, (Note: Pioneered by Friedrich Wilhelm Sturz (1808), and subsequently supported by Olivier Masson (1996), Michael Meier-Brügger (2003), Johannes Engels (2010), J. Méndez Dosuna (2012), Joachim Matzinger (2016), Georgios Giannakis (2017), Emilio Crespo (2017, 2023), Claude Brixhe (2018), M. B. Hatzopoulos (2020) and Lucien van Beek (2022).) and occasionally as a dialect of Aeolic Greek (Note: Suggested by August Fick (1874), Otto Hoffmann (1906), N. G. L. Hammond (1997), Ian Worthington (2012) and Wojciech Sowa (2018, 2022).) or as a distinct Hellenic language (i.e. a sister language of Greek). (Note: Suggested by Georgiev (1966), Joseph (2001) and Hamp (2013).) However, the prestige language of Macedon during the Classical era was Attic Greek, replaced by Koine Greek during the Hellenistic era. Their religious beliefs mirrored those of other Greeks, following the main deities of the Greek pantheon, although the Macedonians continued Archaic burial practices that had ceased in other parts of Greece after the 6th century BC. Aside from the monarchy, the core of Macedonian society was its nobility. Similar to the aristocracy of neighboring Thessaly, their wealth was largely built on herding horses and cattle.

Although composed of various clans, the kingdom of Macedon, established around the 7th century BC, is mostly associated with the Argead dynasty and the tribe named after it. The dynasty, also known as the Temenid dynasty, was allegedly founded by Perdiccas I, descendant of the legendary Temenus of Argos. Traditionally ruled by independent families, the Macedonians seem to have accepted Argead rule by the time of Alexander I (r. 498 – 454 BC). Under Philip II (r. 359 – 336 BC) ruling from Pella, the Macedonians are credited with numerous military innovations, which enlarged their territory and increased their control over other areas extending into Thrace. This consolidation of territory allowed for the exploits of Alexander the Great (r. 336 – 323 BC), the conquest of the Achaemenid Empire, the establishment of the diadochi successor states, and the inauguration of the Hellenistic period in West Asia, Greece, and the broader Mediterranean world. The Macedonians were eventually conquered by the Roman Republic, which dismantled the Macedonian monarchy at the end of the Third Macedonian War (171–168 BC) and established the Roman province of Macedonia after the Fourth Macedonian War (150–148 BC).

Authors, historians, and statesmen of the ancient world often expressed ambiguous if not conflicting ideas about the ethnic identity of the Macedonians as either Greeks, semi-Greeks, or even barbarians. This has led to some debate among modern academics about the precise ethnic identity of the Macedonians, who nevertheless embraced many aspects of contemporaneous Greek culture such as participation in Greek religious cults and athletic games, including the exclusive Ancient Olympic Games. Given the scant linguistic evidence, such as the Pella curse tablet, ancient Macedonian is regarded by most scholars as another Greek dialect related to Northwest Greek. The ancient Macedonians participated in the production and fostering of Classical and later Hellenistic art. In terms of visual arts, they produced frescoes, mosaics, sculptures, and decorative metalwork. The performing arts of music and Greek theatrical dramas were highly appreciated, while famous playwrights such as Euripides came to live in Macedonia. The kingdom also attracted the presence of renowned philosophers, such as Aristotle, while native Macedonians contributed to the field of ancient Greek literature, especially Greek historiography. Their sport and leisure activities included hunting, foot races, and chariot races, as well as feasting and drinking at aristocratic banquets known as symposia.

== Etymology ==
The ethnonym Μακεδόνες (Makedónes) stems from the Ancient Greek adjective μακεδνός (makednós), meaning "tall, slim", also the name of a people related to the Dorians (Herodotus). It is most likely cognate with the adjective μακρός (makrós), meaning "long" or "tall" in Ancient Greek. The name is believed to have originally meant either "highlanders", "the tall ones", or "high grown men". (Note: Engels 2010, p. 89; Borza 1995, p. 114; Eugene N. Borza writes that the "highlanders" or "Makedones" of the mountainous regions of western Macedonia are derived from northwest Greek stock; they were akin to those who at an earlier time may have migrated south to become the historical "Dorians".) According to Robert Beekes, the Greek word μακεδνός (makednós) cannot be analyzed as an original Indo-European word, and belongs to the pre-Greek substrate.

== History ==
=== Historical overview ===
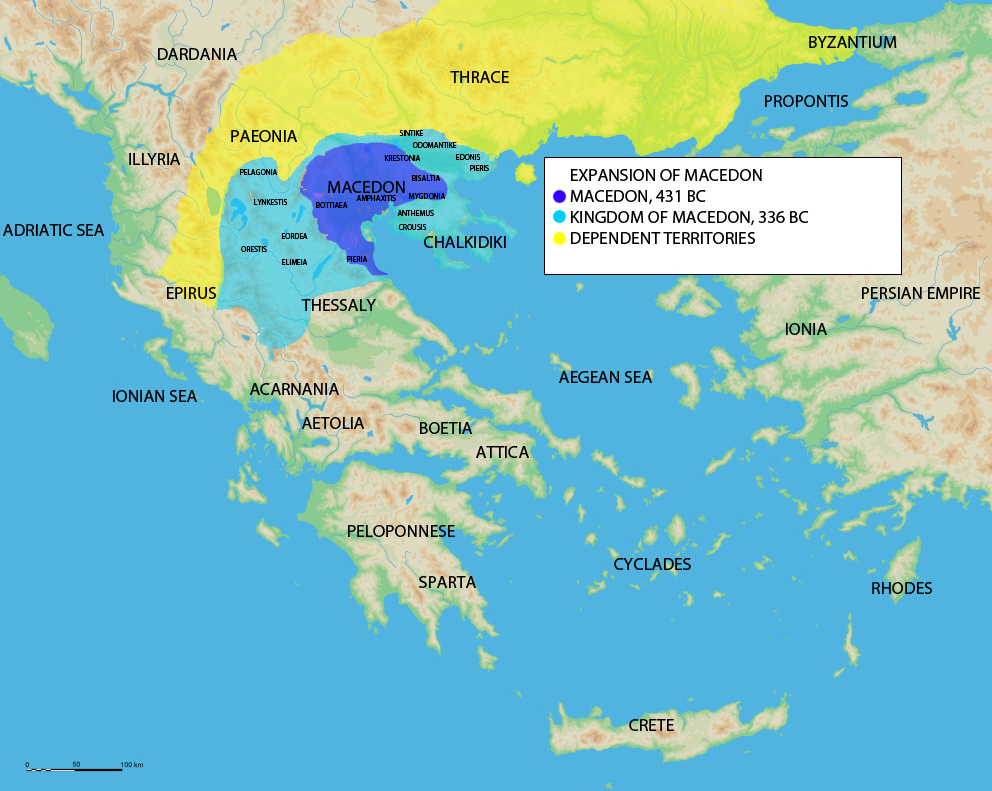
The expansion of ancient Macedon up to the death of Philip II of Macedon (r. 359 – 336 BC)

The expansion of the Macedonian kingdom has been described as a three-stage process. As a frontier kingdom on the border of the Greek world with barbarian Europe, the Macedonians first subjugated their immediate northern neighbours — various Paeonian, Illyrian and Thracian tribes — before turning against the states of southern and central Greece. Macedonia then led a pan-Hellenic military force against their primary objective—the conquest of Persia—which they achieved with remarkable ease. Following the death of Alexander the Great and the Partition of Babylon in 323 BC, the diadochi successor states such as the Attalid, Ptolemaic and Seleucid Empires were established, ushering in the Hellenistic period of Greece, West Asia and the Hellenized Mediterranean Basin. With Alexander's conquest of the Achaemenid Empire, Macedonians colonized territories as far east as Central Asia.

The Macedonians continued to rule much of Hellenistic Greece (323–146 BC), forming alliances with Greek leagues such as the Cretan League and Epirote League (and prior to this, the Kingdom of Epirus). However, they often fell into conflict with the Achaean League, Aetolian League, the city-state of Sparta, and the Ptolemaic dynasty of Hellenistic Egypt that intervened in wars of the Aegean region and mainland Greece. After Macedonia formed an alliance with Hannibal of Ancient Carthage in 215 BC, the rival Roman Republic responded by fighting a series of wars against Macedonia in conjunction with its Greek allies such as Pergamon and Rhodes. In the aftermath of the Third Macedonian War (171–168 BC), the Romans abolished the Macedonian monarchy under Perseus of Macedon (r. 179–168 BC– ) and replaced the kingdom with four client state republics. A brief revival of the monarchy by the pretender Andriscus led to the Fourth Macedonian War (150–148 BC), after which Rome established the Roman province of Macedonia and subjugated the Macedonians.

=== Prehistoric homeland ===
The positions of the Balkan tribes prior to the Macedonian expansion, according to Nicholas Hammond

In Greek mythology, Makedon is the eponymous hero of Macedonia and is mentioned in Hesiod's Catalogue of Women. The first historical attestation of the Macedonians occurs in the works of Herodotus during the mid-5th century BC. The Macedonians are absent in Homer's Catalogue of Ships and the term "Macedonia" itself appears late. The Iliad states that upon leaving Mount Olympus, Hera journeyed via Pieria and Emathia before reaching Athos. This is re-iterated by Strabo in his Geography. Nevertheless, archaeological evidence indicates that Mycenaean contact with or penetration into the Macedonian interior possibly started from the early 14th century BC.

In his A History of Macedonia, Nicholas Hammond reconstructed the earliest phases of Macedonian history based on his interpretation of later literary accounts and archaeological excavations in the region of Macedonia. According to Hammond, the Macedonians are missing from early Macedonian historical accounts because they had been living in the Orestian highlands since before the Greek Dark Ages, possibly having originated from the same (proto-Greek) population pool that produced other Greek peoples. The Macedonian tribes subsequently moved down from Orestis in the upper Haliacmon to the Pierian highlands in the lower Haliacmon because of pressure from the Molossians, a related tribe who had migrated to Orestis from Pelagonia. In their new Pierian home north of Olympus, the Macedonian tribes mingled with the proto-Dorians. This might account for traditions which placed the eponymous founder, Makedon, near Pieria and Olympus. Some traditions placed the Dorian homeland in the Pindus mountain range in western Thessaly, whilst Herodotus pushed this further north to the Macedonian Pindus and claimed that the Greeks were referred to as Makednon ethnos (Μακεδνὸν ἔθνος) and then as Doric ethnos when they moved further south. A different, southern homeland theory also exists in traditional historiography. Arnold J. Toynbee asserted that the Makedones migrated north to Macedonia from central Greece, placing the Dorian homeland in Phthiotis and citing the traditions of fraternity between Makedon and Magnes.

=== Temenids and Argeads ===
The Macedonian expansion is said to have been led by the ruling Temenid dynasty, known as "Argeads" or "Argives". Herodotus said that Perdiccas, the dynasty's founder, was descended from the Heraclid Temenus. He left Argos with his two older brothers Aeropus and Gayanes, and travelled via Illyria to Lebaea, a city in Upper Macedonia which certain scholars have tried to connect with the villages Albus or Velventos. Here, the brothers served as shepherds for a local ruler. After a vision, the brothers fled to another region in Macedonia near the Midas Gardens by the foot of the Vermio Mountains, and then set about subjugating the rest of Macedonia. Thucydides's account is similar to that of Herodotus, making it probable that the story was disseminated by the Macedonian court, i.e. it accounts for the belief the Macedonians had about the origin of their kingdom, if not an actual memory of this beginning. Later historians modified the dynastic traditions by introducing variously Caranus or Archelaus, the son of Temenus, as the founding Temenid kings—although there is no doubt that Euripides transformed Caranus to Archelaus meaning "leader of the people" in his play Archelaus, in an attempt to please Archelaus I of Macedon.

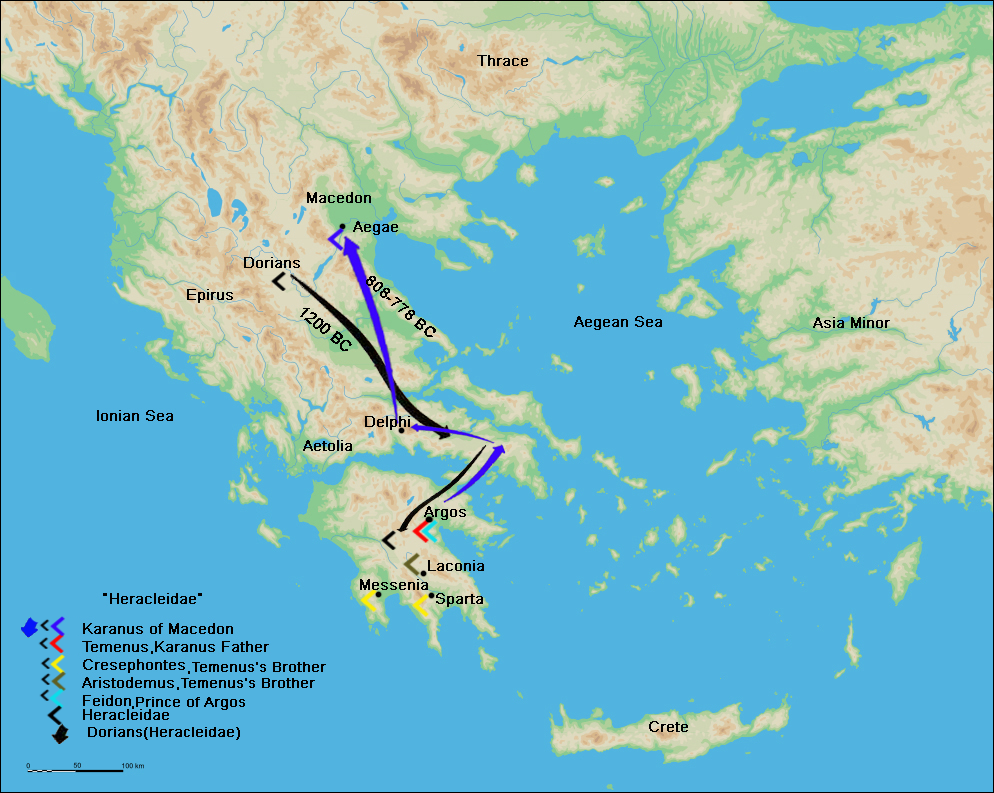
The route of the Argeads from Argos, Peloponnese to Macedonia

The earliest sources, Herodotus and Thucydides, called the royal family "Temenidae". In later sources (Strabo, Appian, Pausanias) the term "Argeadae" was introduced. However, Appian said that the term Argeadae referred to a leading Macedonian tribe rather than the name of the ruling dynasty. The connection of the Argead name to the royal family is uncertain. The words "Argead" and "Argive" derive via Latin Argīvus from Ancient Greek: Ἀργεῖος (Argeios), meaning "of or from Argos", and is first attested in Homer, where it was also used as a collective designation for the Greeks ("Ἀργείων Δαναῶν", Argive Danaans). The most common connection to the royal family, as written by Herodotus, is with Peloponnesian Argos. Appian connects it with Orestian Argos. According to another tradition mentioned by Justin, the name was adopted after Caranus seized the city of Edessa and renamed it Aegae, thereby calling the inhabitants Aegeatae. A figure, Argeas, is mentioned in the Iliad (16.417).

Taking Herodotus's lineage account as the most trustworthy, Appian said that after Perdiccas, six successive heirs ruled: Argeus, Philip, Aeropus, Alcetas, Amyntas and Alexander. Amyntas I (r. 547 – 498 BC) ruled at the time of the Persian invasion of Paeonia and when Macedon became a vassal state of Achaemenid Persia. However, Alexander I (r. 498 – 454 BC) is the first truly historic figure. Based on this line of succession and an estimated average rule of 25 to 30 years, the beginnings of the Macedonian dynasty have thus been traditionally dated to 750 BC. Hammond supports the traditional view that the Temenidae did arrive from the Peloponnese and took charge of Macedonian leadership, possibly usurping rule from a native "Argead" dynasty with Illyrian help. However, other scholars doubt the veracity of their Peloponnesian origins. For example, Miltiades Hatzopoulos takes Appian's testimony to mean that the royal lineage imposed itself onto the tribes of the Middle Heliacmon from Argos Orestikon, whilst Eugene N. Borza argues that the Argeads were a family of notables hailing from Vergina.

=== Expansion from the core ===
Expulsion of the Pieres from the region of Olympus to the Pangaion Hills by the Macedonians

Both Strabo and Thucydides said that Emathia and Pieria were mostly occupied by Thracians (Pieres, Paeonians) and Bottiaeans, as well as some Illyrian and Epirote tribes. Herodotus states that the Bryges were cohabitants with the Macedonians before their mass migration to Anatolia. If a group of ethnically definable Macedonian tribes were living in the Pierian highlands prior to their expansion, the first conquest was of the Pierian piedmont and coastal plain, including Vergina. The tribes may have launched their expansion from a base near Mount Bermion, according to Herodotus. Thucydides describes the Macedonian expansion specifically as a process of conquest led by the Argeads:

But the country along the sea which is now called Macedonia, was first acquired and made a kingdom by Alexander [I], father of Perdiccas [II] and his forefathers, who were originally Temenidae from Argos. They defeated and expelled from Pieria the Pierians ... and also expelled the Bottiaeans from Bottiaea ... they acquired as well a narrow strip of Paeonia extending along the Axios river from the interior to Pella and the sea. Beyond the Axios they possess the territory as far as the Strymon called Mygdonia, having driven out the Edoni. Moreover, they expelled from the district now called Eordaea the Eordi ... The Macedonians also made themselves rulers of certain places ... namely Anthemus, Grestonia, and a large part of Macedonia proper.

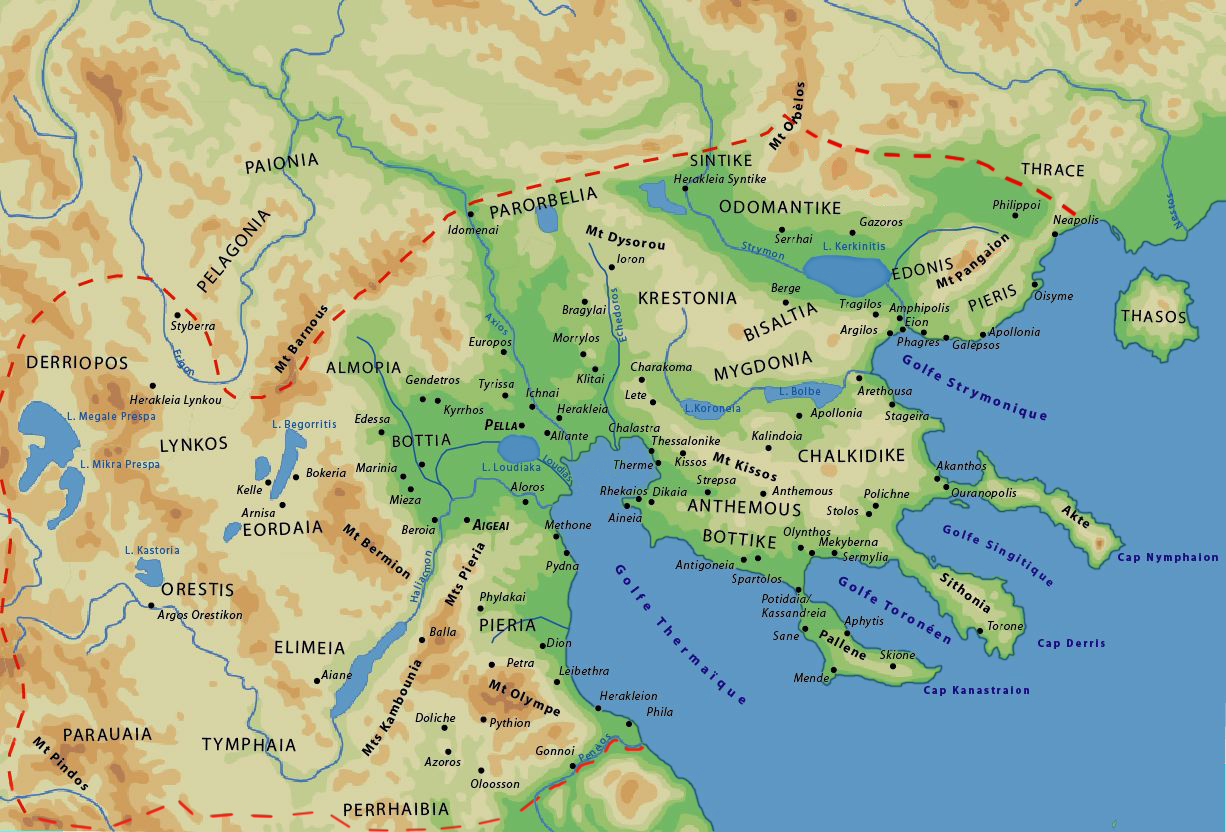
Regions of Mygdonia, Edonia, Bisaltia, Crestonia and Bottiaea

Thucydides's account gives a geographical overview of Macedonian possessions at the time of Alexander I's rule. To reconstruct a chronology of the expansion by Alexander I's predecessors is more difficult, but generally, three stages have been proposed from Thucydides' reading. The initial and most important conquest was of Pieria and Bottiaea, including the locations of Pydna and Dium. The second stage consolidated rule in Pieria and Bottiaea, captured Methone and Pella, and extended rule over Eordaea and Almopia. According to Hammond, the third stage occurred after 550 BC, when the Macedonians gained control over Mygdonia, Edonis, lower Paeonia, Bisaltia and Crestonia. However, the second stage might have occurred as late as 520 BC; and the third stage probably did not occur until after 479 BC, when the Macedonians capitalized on the weakened Paeonian state after the Persian withdrawal from Macedon and the rest of their mainland European territories. Whatever the case, Thucydides' account of the Macedonian state describes its accumulated territorial extent by the rule of Perdiccas II, Alexander I's son. Hammond has said that the early stages of Macedonian expansion were militaristic, subduing or expunging populations from a large and varied area. Pastoralism and highland living could not support a very concentrated settlement density, forcing pastoralist tribes to search for more arable lowlands suitable for agriculture.

=== Ethnogenesis scenario ===
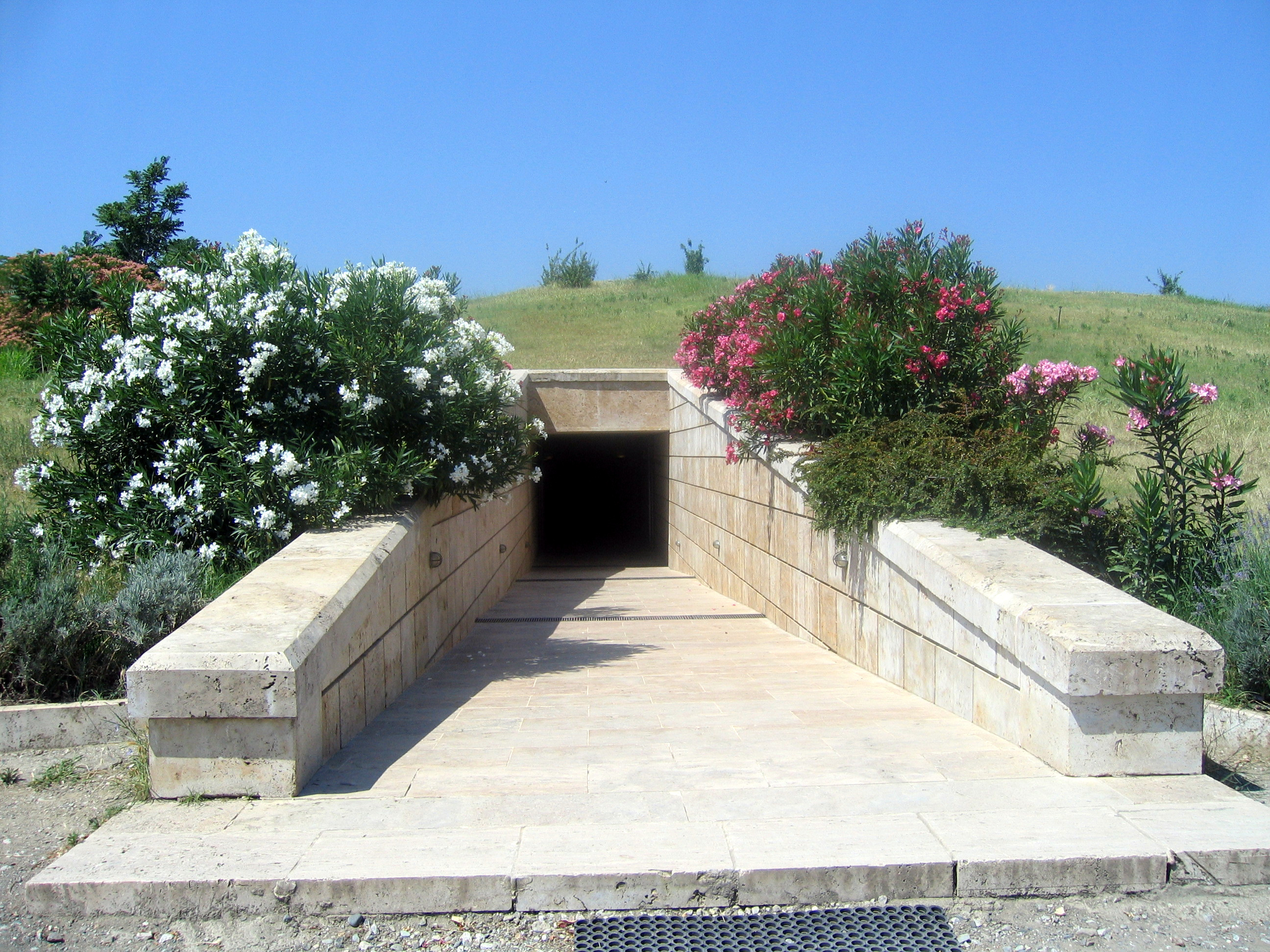
The entrance to the "Great Tumulus" Museum at Vergina

Present-day scholars have highlighted several inconsistencies in the traditionalist perspective first set in place by Hammond. An alternative model of state and ethnos formation, promulgated by an alliance of regional elites, which redates the creation of the Macedonian kingdom to the 6th century BC, was proposed in 2010. According to these scholars, direct literary, archaeological, and linguistic evidence to support Hammond's contention that a distinct Macedonian ethnos had existed in the Haliacmon valley since the Aegean civilizations is lacking. Hammond's interpretation has been criticized as a "conjectural reconstruction" from what appears during later, historical times.

Similarly, the historicity of migration, conquest and population expulsion have also been questioned. Thucydides's account of the forced expulsion of the Pierians and Bottiaeans could have been formed on the basis of his perceived similarity of names of the Pierians and Bottiaeans living in the Struma valley with the names of regions in Macedonia; whereas his account of Eordean extermination was formulated because such toponymic correspondences are absent. Likewise, the Argead conquest of Macedonia may be viewed as a commonly used literary topos in classical Macedonian rhetoric. Tales of migration served to create complex genealogical connections between trans-regional ruling elites, while at the same time were used by the ruling dynasty to legitimize their rule, heroicize mythical ancestors and distance themselves from their subjects.

Conflict was a historical reality in the early Macedonian kingdom and pastoralist traditions allowed the potential for population mobility. Greek archaeologists have found that some of the passes linking the Macedonian highlands with the valley regions have been used for thousands of years. However, the archaeological evidence does not point to any significant disruptions between the Iron Age and Hellenistic period in Macedonia. The general continuity of material culture, settlement sites, and pre-Greek onomasticon contradict the alleged ethnic cleansing account of early Macedonian expansion.

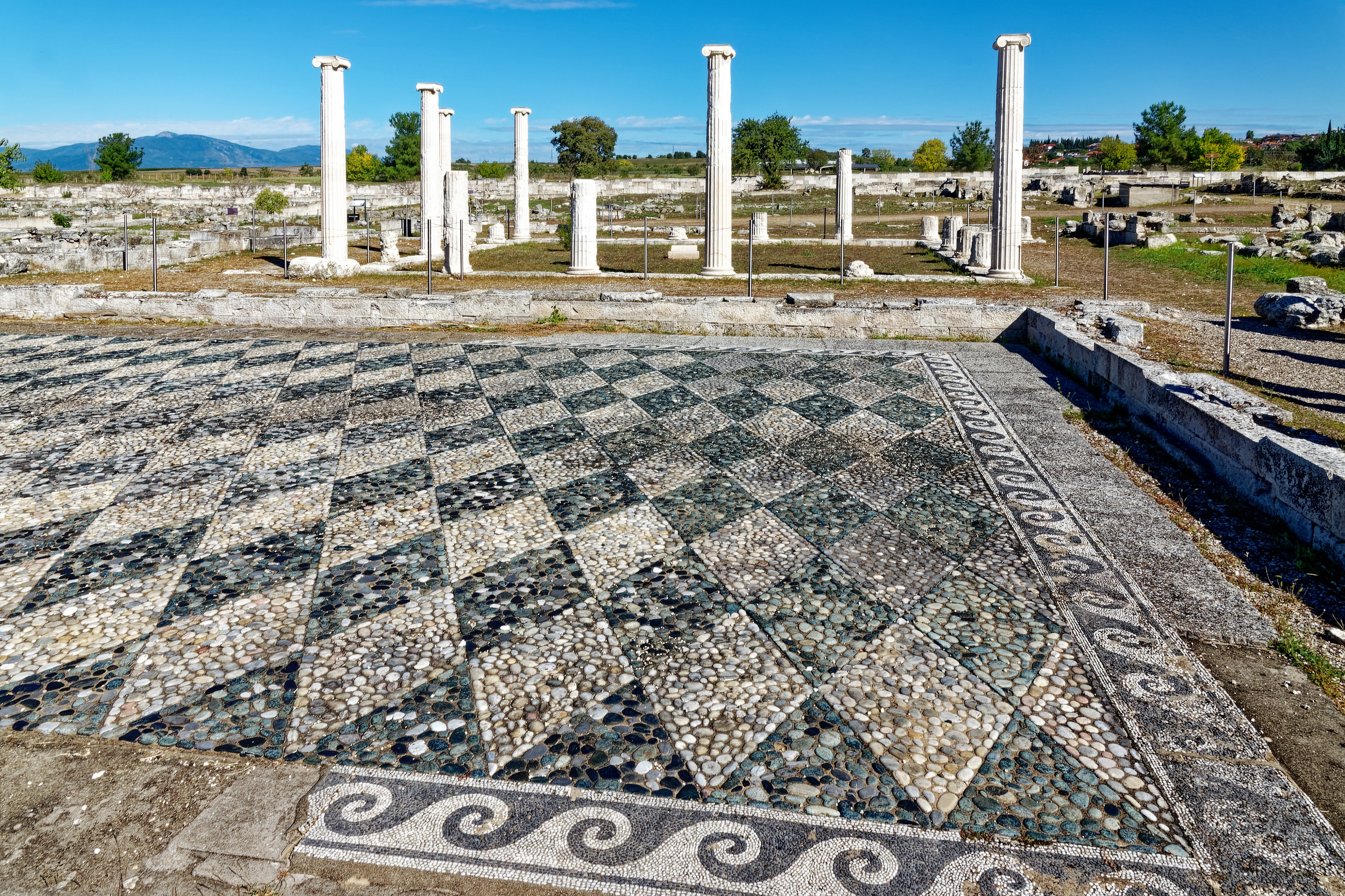
An atrium with a pebble-mosaic paving in Pella, the Macedonian capital

The process of state formation in Macedonia was similar to that of its neighbours in Epirus, Illyria, Thrace and Thessaly, whereby regional elites could mobilize disparate communities for the purpose of organizing land and resources. Local notables were often based in urban-like settlements, although contemporaneous historians often did not recognize them as poleis because they were not self-ruled but under the rule of a "king". From the mid-6th century, there appears a series of exceptionally rich burials throughout the region—in Trebeništa, Vergina, Sindos, Agia Paraskevi, Pella-Archontiko, Aiani, Gevgelija, Amphipolis—sharing a similar burial rite and grave accompaniments, interpreted to represent the rise of a new regional ruling class sharing a common ideology, customs and religious beliefs. A common geography, mode of existence, and defensive interests might have necessitated the creation of a political confederacy among otherwise ethno-linguistically diverse communities, which led to the consolidation of a new Macedonian ethnic identity.

The traditional view that Macedonia was populated by rural ethnic groups in constant conflict is slowly changing, bridging the cultural gap between southern Epirus and the north Aegean region. Hatzopoulos's studies on Macedonian institutions have lent support to the hypothesis that Macedonian state formation occurred via an integration of regional elites, which were based in city-like centres, including the Argeadae at Vergina, the Paeonian/Edonian peoples in Sindos, Ichnae and Pella, and the mixed Macedonian-Barbarian colonies in the Thermaic Gulf and western Chalkidiki. The Temenidae became overall leaders of a new Macedonian state because of the diplomatic proficiency of Alexander I and the logistic centrality of Vergina itself. It has been suggested that a breakdown in traditional Balkan tribal traditions associated with adaptation of Aegean socio-political institutions created a climate of institutional flexibility in a vast, resource-rich land. Non-Argead centres increasingly became dependent allies, allowing the Argeads to gradually assert and secure their control over the lower and eastern territories of Macedonia. This control was fully consolidated by Phillip II (r. 359 – 336 BC).

== Culture and society ==
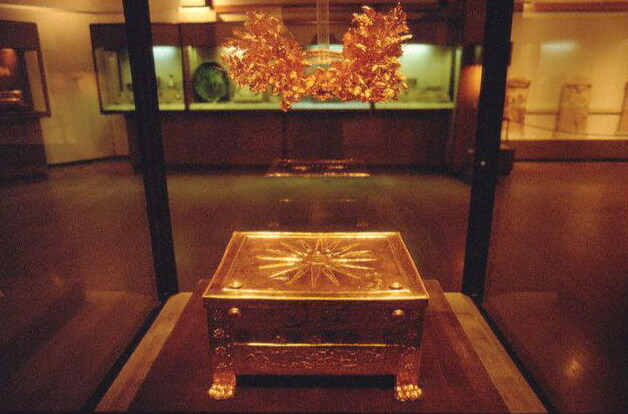
The Golden Larnax, at the Museum of Vergina, which contains the remains Philip II of Macedon (r. 359 – 336 BC)

Macedonia had a distinct material culture by the Early Iron Age. Typically Balkan burial, ornamental, and ceramic forms were used for most of the Iron Age. These features suggest broad cultural affinities and organizational structures analogous with Thracian, Epirote, and Illyrian regions. This did not necessarily symbolize a shared cultural identity, or any political allegiance between these regions. In the late sixth century BC, Macedonia became open to south Greek influences, although a small but detectable amount of interaction with the south had been present since late Mycenaean times. By the 5th century BC, Macedonia was a part of the "Greek cultural milieu" according to Edward M. Anson, possessing many cultural traits typical of the southern Greek city-states. Classical Greek objects and customs were appropriated selectively and used in peculiarly Macedonian ways. In addition, influences from Achaemenid Persia in culture and economy are evident from the 5th century BC onward, such as the inclusion of Persian grave goods at Macedonian burial sites as well as the adoption of royal customs such as a Persian-style throne during the reign of Philip II.

=== Economy, society, and social class ===
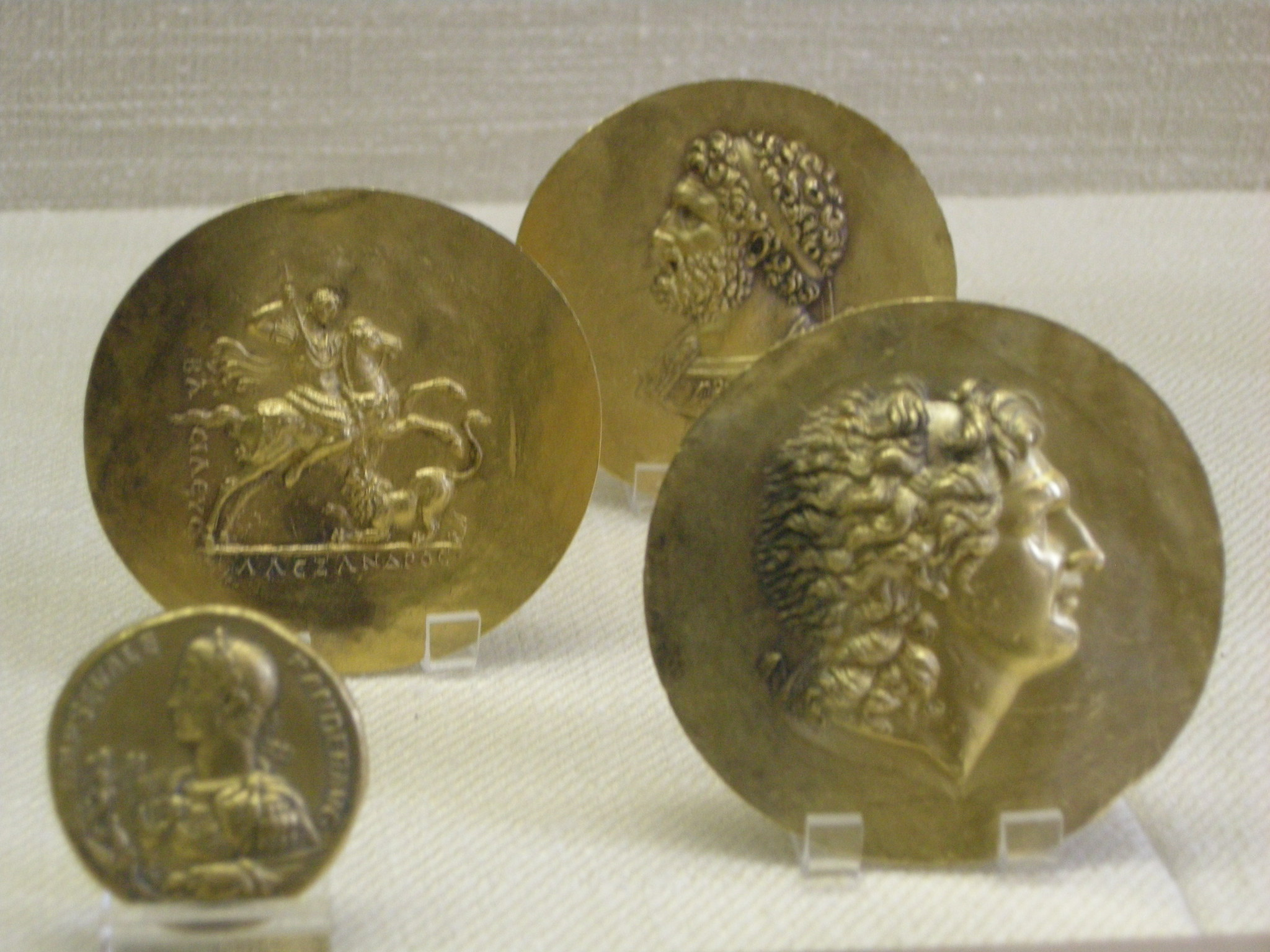
Macedonian coins and medallions depicting Alexander the Great and Philip II

The way of life of the inhabitants of Upper Macedonia differed little from that of their neighbours in Epirus and Illyria, engaging in seasonal transhumance supplemented by agriculture. Young Macedonian men were typically expected to engage in hunting and martial combat as a byproduct of their transhumance lifestyles of herding livestock such as goats and sheep, while horse breeding and raising cattle were other common pursuits. In these mountainous regions, upland sites were important focal points for local communities. In these difficult terrains, competition for resources often precipitated intertribal conflict and raiding forays into the comparatively richer lowland settlements of coastal Macedonia and Thessaly. Despite the remoteness of the upper Macedonian highlands, excavations at Aiani since 1983 have discovered finds attesting to the presence of social organization since the 2nd millennium BC. The finds include the oldest pieces of black-and-white pottery, which is characteristic of the tribes of northwest Greece, discovered so far. Found with Mycenaean sherds, they can be dated with certainty to the 14th century BC. The finds also include some of the oldest samples of writing in Macedonia, among them inscriptions bearing Greek names like Θέμιδα (Themida). The inscriptions demonstrate that Hellenism in Upper Macedonia was at a high economic, artistic, and cultural level by the sixth century BC—overturning the notion that Upper Macedonia was culturally and socially isolated from the rest of ancient Greece.

By contrast, the alluvial plains of Lower Macedonia and Pelagonia, which had a comparative abundance of natural resources such as timber and minerals, favored the development of a native aristocracy, with a wealth that at times surpassed the classical Greek poleis. Exploitation of minerals helped expedite the introduction of coinage in Macedonia from the 5th century BC, developing under southern Greek, Thracian and Persian influences. Some Macedonians engaged in farming, often with irrigation, land reclamation, and horticulture activities supported by the Macedonian state. However, the bedrock of the Macedonian economy and state finances was the twofold exploitation of the forests with logging and valuable minerals such as copper, iron, gold, and silver with mining. The conversion of these raw materials into finished products and their sale encouraged the growth of urban centers and a gradual shift away from the traditional rustic Macedonian lifestyle during the course of the 5th century BC.

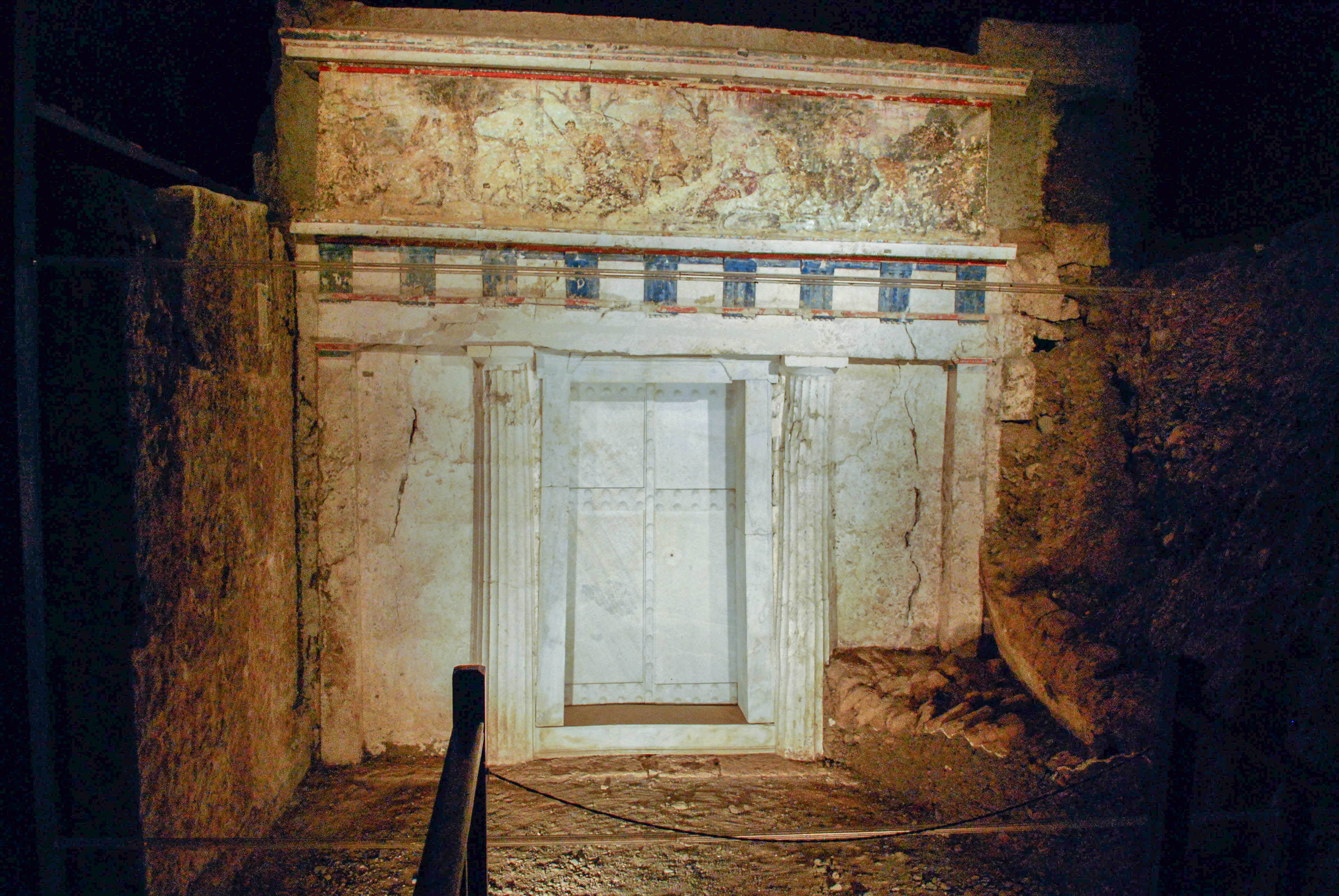
Entrance to the tomb of Philip II of Macedon (r. 359 – 336 BC).

Macedonian society was dominated by aristocratic families whose main source of wealth and prestige was their herds of horses and cattle. In this respect, Macedonia was similar to Thessaly and Thrace. These aristocrats were second only to the king in terms of power and privilege, filling the ranks of his administration and serving as commanding officers in the military. It was in the more bureaucratic regimes of the Hellenistic kingdoms succeeding Alexander the Great's empire where greater social mobility for members of society seeking to join the aristocracy could be found, especially in Ptolemaic Egypt. In contrast with classical Greek poleis, the Macedonians held only few slaves.

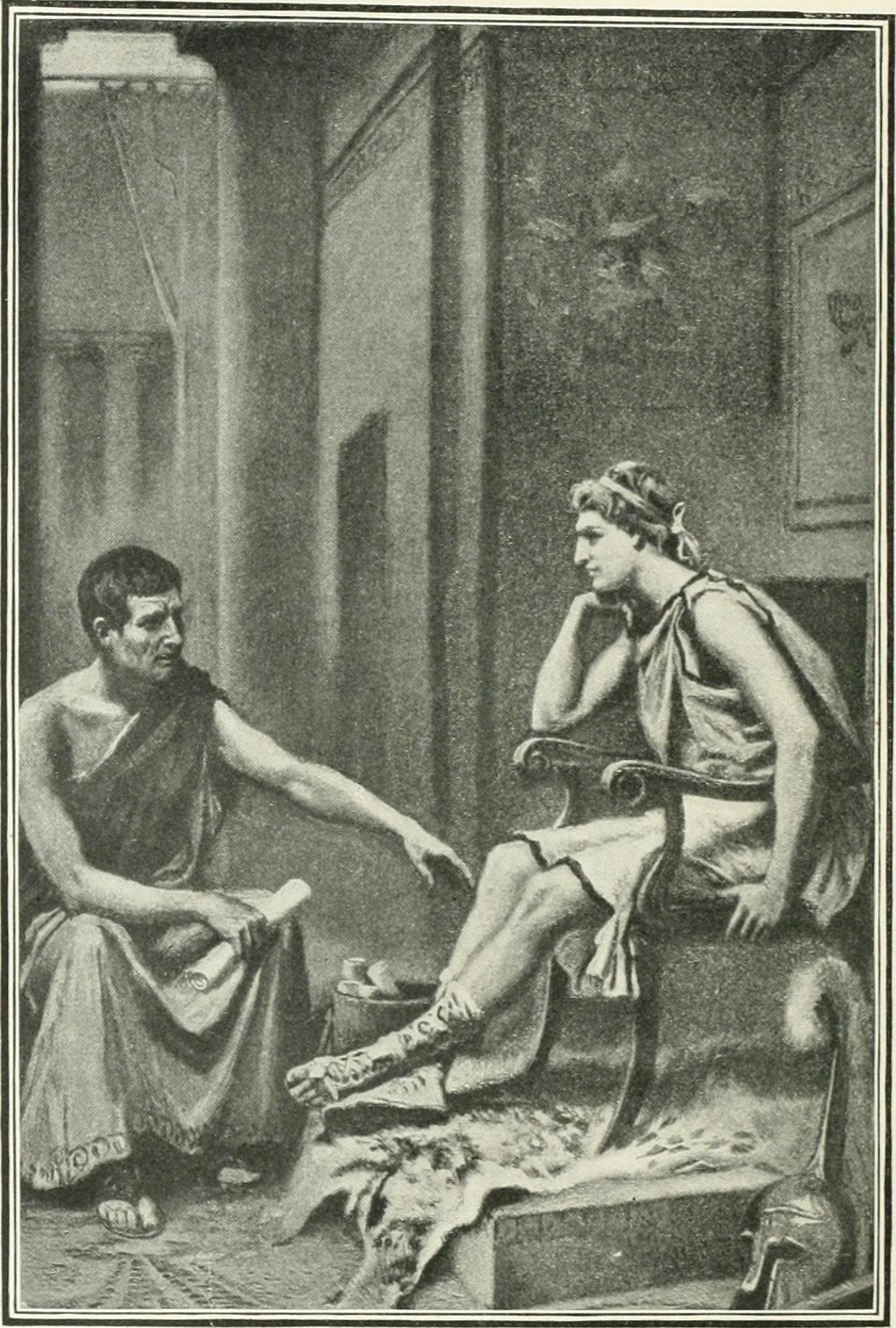
Aristotle, a philosopher from the Macedonian town of Stageira, tutoring young Alexander in the Royal Palace of Pella. The Macedonian Kings often sought the best education possible for their heirs. Artwork by Jean Leon Gerome Ferris.

However, unlike Thessaly, Macedonia was ruled by a monarchy from its earliest history until the Roman conquest in 167 BC. The nature of the kingship, however, remains debated. One viewpoint sees it as an autocracy, whereby the king held absolute power and was at the head of both government and society, wielding arguably unlimited authority to handle affairs of state and public policy. He was also the leader of a very personal regime with close relationships or connections to his hetairoi, the core of the Macedonian aristocracy. Any other position of authority, including the army, was appointed at the whim of the king himself. The other, "constitutionalist", position argues that there was an evolution from a society of many minor "kings" – each of equal authority – to a sovereign military state whereby an army of citizen soldiers supported a central king against a rival class of nobility. Kingship was hereditary along the paternal line, yet it is unclear if primogeniture was strictly observed as an established custom.

During the Late Bronze Age (circa 15th-century BC), the ancient Macedonians developed distinct, matt-painted wares that evolved from Middle Helladic pottery traditions originating in central and southern Greece. The Macedonians continued to use an individualized form of material culture—albeit showing analogies in ceramic, ornamental and burial forms with the so-called Lausitz culture between 1200 and 900 BC—and that of the Glasinac culture after circa 900 BC. While some of these influences persisted beyond the sixth century BC, a more ubiquitous presence of items of an Aegean-Mediterranean character is seen from the latter sixth century BC, as Greece recovered from its Dark Ages. Southern Greek impulses penetrated Macedonia via trade with north Aegean colonies such as Methone and those in the Chalcidice, neighbouring Thessaly, and from the Ionic colonies of Asia Minor. Ionic influences were later supplanted by those of Athenian provenance. Thus, by the latter sixth century, local elites could acquire exotic Aegean items such as Athenian red figure pottery, fine tablewares, olive oil and wine amphorae, fine ceramic perfume flasks, glass, marble and precious metal ornaments—all of which would serve as status symbols. By the 5th century BC, these items became widespread in Macedonia and in much of the central Balkans.

Macedonian settlements have a strong continuity dating from the Bronze Age, maintaining traditional construction techniques for residential architecture. While settlement numbers appeared to drop in central and southern Greece after 1000 BC, there was a dramatic increase of settlements in Macedonia. These settlements seemed to have developed along raised promontories near river flood plains called tells (Greek: τύμβοι). Their ruins are most commonly found in western Macedonia between Florina and Lake Vergoritis, the upper and middle Haliacmon River, and Bottiaea. They can also be found on either side of the Axios and in the Chalcidice in eastern Macedonia.

=== Religion and funerary practices ===
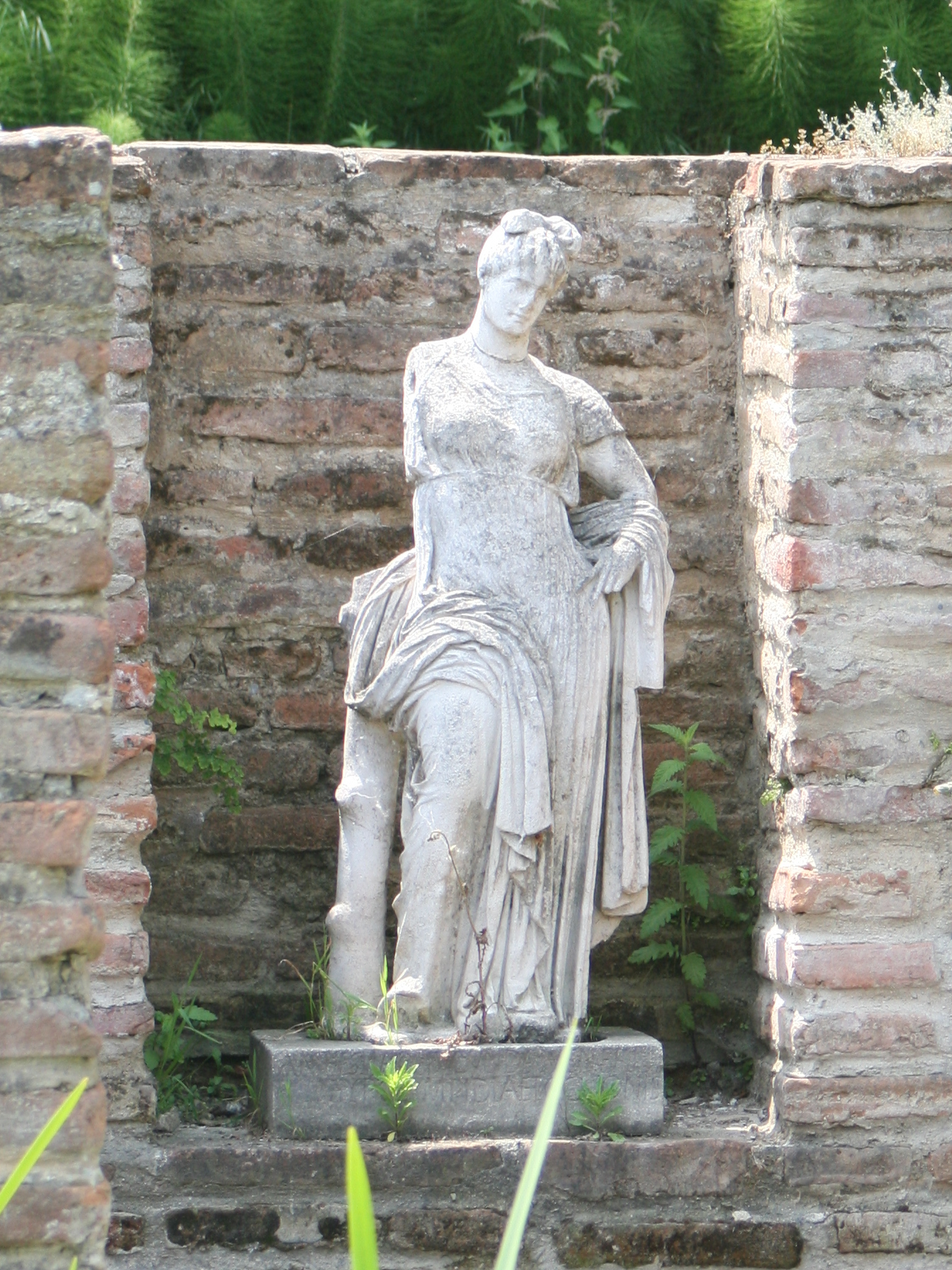
Ancient Dion was a centre of the worship of Zeus and the most important spiritual sanctuary of the ancient Macedonians.

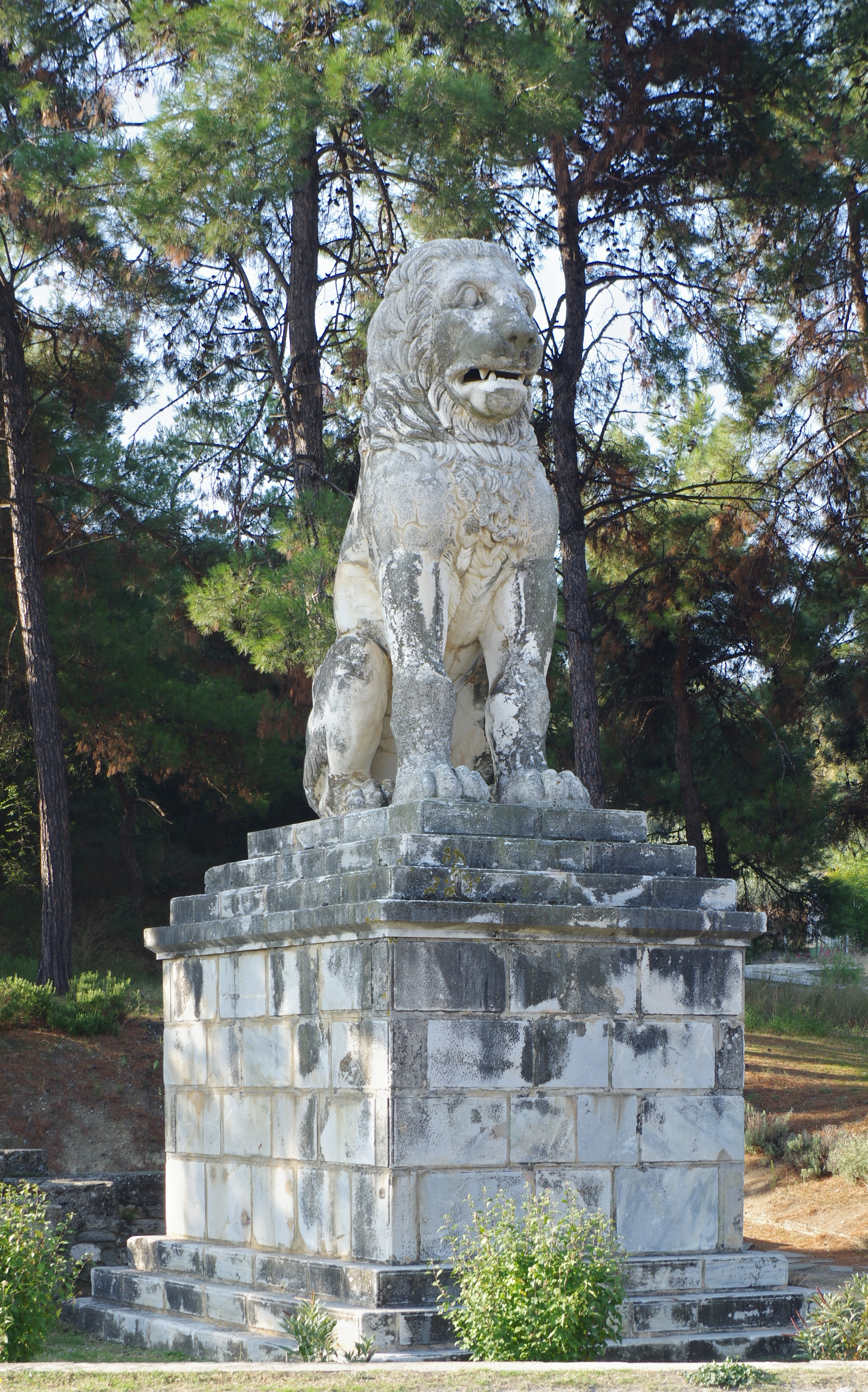
The Lion of Amphipolis in Amphipolis, northern Greece, a 4th-century BC marble tomb sculpture erected in honor of Laomedon of Mytilene, a general who served under Alexander the Great

By the 5th century BC the Macedonians and the rest of the Greeks worshiped more or less the same deities of the Greek pantheon. In Macedonia, politics and religion often intertwined. For instance, the head of state for the city of Amphipolis also served as the priest of Asklepios, Greek god of medicine; a similar arrangement existed at Cassandreia, where a cult priest honoring the city's founder Cassander was the nominal municipal leader. Foreign cults from Egypt were fostered by the royal court, such as the temple of Sarapis at Thessaloniki, while Macedonian kings Philip III of Macedon and Alexander IV of Macedon made votive offerings to the internationally esteemed Samothrace temple complex of the Cabeiri mystery cult. This was also the same location where Perseus of Macedon fled and received sanctuary following his defeat by the Romans at the Battle of Pydna in 168 BC. The main sanctuary of Zeus was maintained at Dion, while another at Veria was dedicated to Herakles and received particularly strong patronage from Demetrius II Aetolicus (r. 239 – 229 BC) when he intervened in the affairs of the municipal government at the behest of the cult's main priest.

The ancient Macedonians worshipped the Twelve Olympians, especially Zeus, Artemis, Heracles, and Dionysus. Evidence of this worship exists from the beginning of the 4th century BC onwards, but little evidence of Macedonian religious practices from earlier times exists. From an early period, Zeus was the single most important deity in the Macedonian pantheon. Makedon, the mythical ancestor of the Macedonians, was held to be a son of Zeus, and Zeus features prominently in Macedonian coinage. The most important centre of worship of Zeus was at Dion in Pieria, the spiritual centre of the Macedonians, where beginning in 400 BC King Archelaus established an annual festival, which in honour of Zeus featured lavish sacrifices and athletic contests. Worship of Zeus's son Heracles was also prominent; coins featuring Heracles appear from the 5th century BC onwards. This was in large part because the Argead kings of Macedon traced their lineage to Heracles, making sacrifices to him in the Macedonian capitals of Vergina and Pella. Numerous votive reliefs and dedications also attest to the importance of the worship of Artemis. Artemis was often depicted as a huntress and served as a tutelary goddess for young girls entering the coming-of-age process, much as Heracles Kynagidas (Hunter) did for young men who had completed it. By contrast, some deities popular elsewhere in the Greek world—notably Poseidon and Hephaestus—were largely ignored by the Macedonians.

Other deities worshipped by the ancient Macedonians were part of a local pantheon which included Thaulos (god of war equated with Ares), Gyga (later equated with Athena), Gozoria (goddess of hunting equated with Artemis), Zeirene (goddess of love equated with Aphrodite) and Xandos (god of light). A notable influence on Macedonian religious life and worship was neighbouring Thessaly; the two regions shared many similar cultural institutions. They were tolerant of, and open to, incorporating foreign religious influences such as the sun worship of the Paeonians. By the 4th century BC, there had been a significant fusion of Macedonian and common Greek religious identity, but Macedonia was nevertheless characterized by an unusually diverse religious life. This diversity extended to the belief in magic, as evidenced by curse tablets. It was a significant but secret aspect of Greek cultural practice.

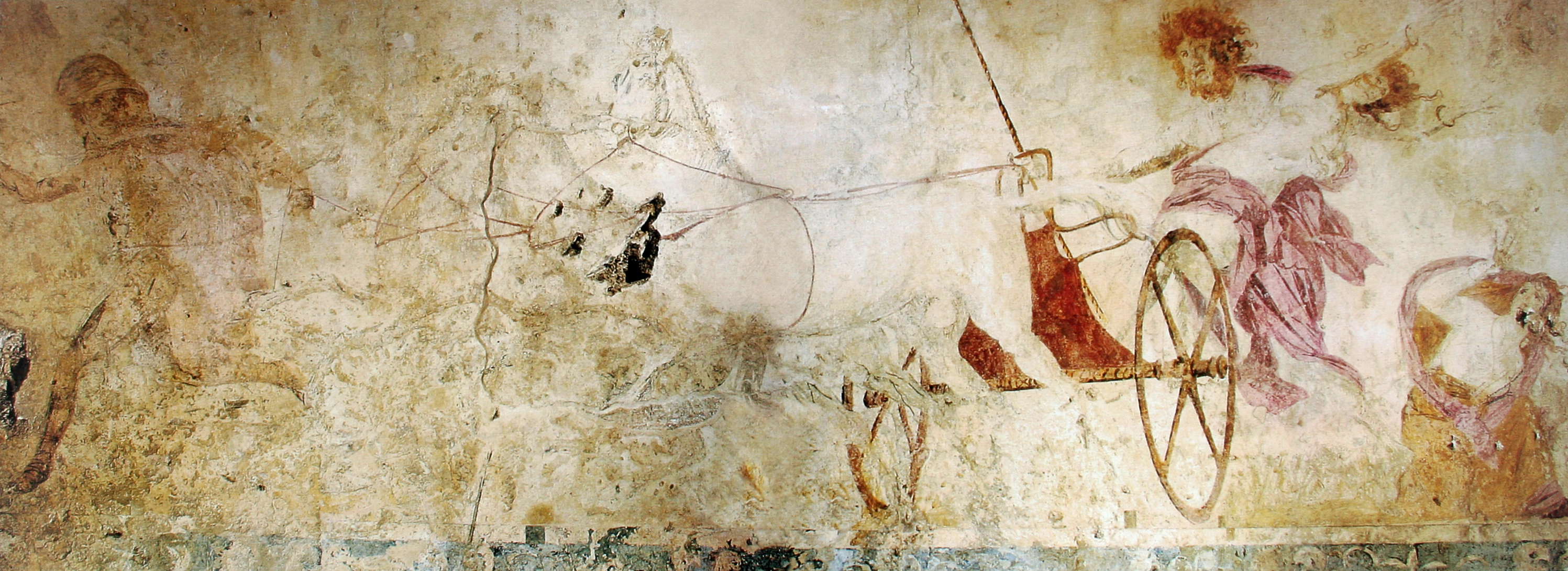
Hades abducting Persephone, fresco in the small Macedonian royal tomb at Vergina, Macedonia, Greece, c. 340 BC

A notable feature of Macedonian culture was the ostentatious burials reserved for its rulers. The Macedonian elite built lavish tombs at the time of death rather than constructing temples during life. Such traditions had been practiced throughout Greece and the central-west Balkans since the Bronze Age. Macedonian burials contain items similar to those at Mycenae, such as burial with weapons, gold death masks etc. From the sixth century, Macedonian burials became particularly lavish, displaying a rich variety of Greek imports reflecting the incorporation of Macedonia into a wider economic and political network centred on the Aegean city-states. Burials contained jewellery and ornaments of unprecedented wealth and artistic style. This zenith of Macedonian "warrior burial" style closely parallels those of sites in south-central Illyria and western Thrace, creating a koinon of elite burials. Lavish warrior burials had been discontinued in southern and central Greece from the seventh century onwards, where offerings at sanctuaries and the erection of temples became the norm. From the sixth century BC, cremation replaced the traditional inhumation rite for elite Macedonians. One of the most lavish tombs dating from the 4th century BC, believed to be that of Phillip II, is at Vergina. It contains extravagant grave goods, highly sophisticated artwork depicting hunting scenes and Greek cultic figures, and a vast array of weaponry. This demonstrates a continuing tradition of the warrior society rather than a focus on religious piety and technology of the intellect, which had become paramount facets of central Greek society in the Classical Period. In the three royal tombs at Vergina, professional painters decorated the walls with a mythological scene of Hades abducting Persephone (Tomb 1) and royal hunting scenes (Tomb 2), while lavish grave goods including weapons, armor, drinking vessels and personal items were housed with the dead, whose bones were burned before burial in decorated gold coffins. Some grave goods and decorations were common in other Macedonian tombs, yet some items found at Vergina were distinctly tied to royalty, including a diadem, luxurious goods, and arms and armor. Scholars have debated about the identity of the tomb occupants since the discovery of their remains in 1977–1978, yet recent research and forensic examination have concluded with certainty that at least one of the persons buried was Philip II (Tomb 2). Located near Tomb 1 are the above-ground ruins of a heroon, a shrine for cult worship of the dead. In 2014, the ancient Macedonian Kasta Tomb, the largest ancient tomb found in Greece (as of 2017), was discovered outside of Amphipolis, a city that was incorporated into the Macedonian realm after its capture by Philip II in 357 BC. The identity of the tomb's occupant is unknown, but archaeologists have speculated that it may be Alexander's close friend Hephaestion.

The deification of Macedonian monarchs perhaps began with the death of Philip II, yet it was his son Alexander the Great who unambiguously claimed to be a living god. As pharaoh of the Egyptians, he was already entitled as Son of Ra and considered the living incarnation of Horus by his Egyptian subjects (a belief that the Ptolemaic successors of Alexander would foster for their own dynasty in Egypt). However, following his visit to the oracle of Didyma in 334 BC that suggested his divinity, he traveled to the Oracle of Zeus Ammon (the Greek equivalent of the Egyptian Amun-Ra) at the Siwa Oasis of the Libyan Desert in 332 BC to confirm his divine status. After the priest there convinced him that Philip II was merely his mortal father and Zeus his actual father, Alexander began styling himself as the 'Son of Zeus', which brought him into contention with some of his Greek subjects who adamantly believed that living men could not be immortals. Although the Seleucid and Ptolemaic diadochi successor states cultivated their own ancestral cults and deification of the rulers as part of state ideology, a similar cult did not exist in the Kingdom of Macedonia.

=== Visual arts ===
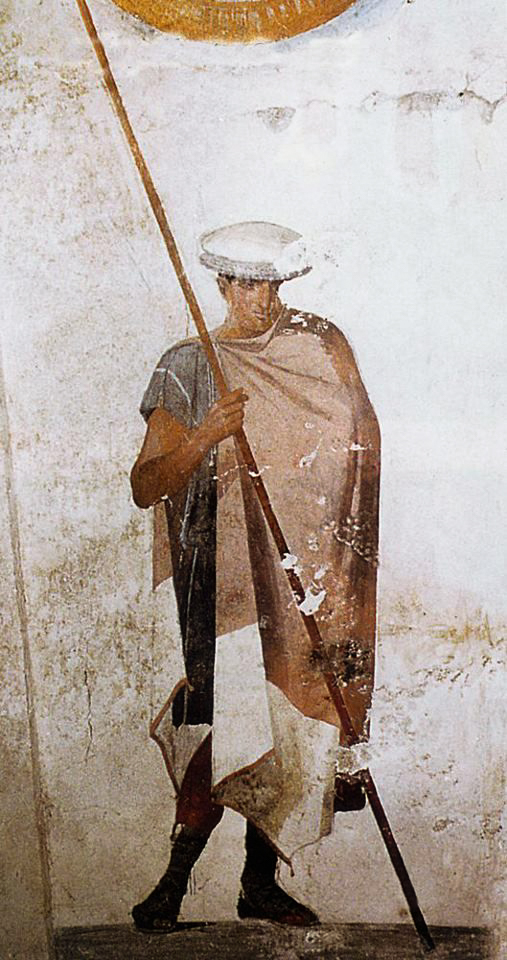
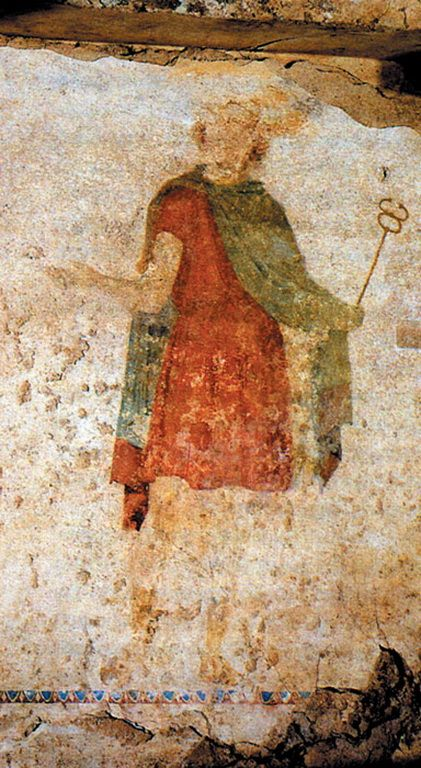
Left: Fresco of a Macedonian soldier resting a spear and wearing a cap, from the tomb of Agios Athanasios, Thessaloniki, 4th century BC.
Right: Fresco from the Tomb of Judgement in ancient Mieza (modern-day Lefkadia), Imathia, Central Macedonia, Greece, depicting religious imagery of the afterlife, 4th century BC

By the reign of Archelaus I of Macedon, the Macedonian elite started importing significantly greater customs, artwork, and art traditions from other regions of Greece. However, they still retained more archaic, perhaps Homeric funerary rites connected with the symposium and drinking rites that were typified with items such as decorative metal kraters that held the ashes of deceased Macedonian nobility in their tombs. Among these is the large bronze Derveni Krater from a 4th-century BC tomb of Thessaloniki, decorated with scenes of the Greek god Dionysus and his entourage and belonging to an aristocrat who had a military career. Macedonian metalwork usually followed Athenian styles of vase shapes from the 6th century BC onward, with drinking vessels, jewellery, containers, crowns, diadems, and coins among the many metal objects found in Macedonian tombs.

Surviving Macedonian painted artwork includes frescoes and murals on walls, but also decoration on sculpted artwork such as statues and reliefs. For instance, trace colors still exist on the bas-reliefs of the Alexander Sarcophagus. Macedonian paintings have allowed historians to investigate the clothing fashions as well as military gear worn by ancient Macedonians, such as the brightly-colored tomb paintings of Agios Athanasios, Thessaloniki showing figures wearing headgear ranging from feathered helmets to kausia and petasos caps.

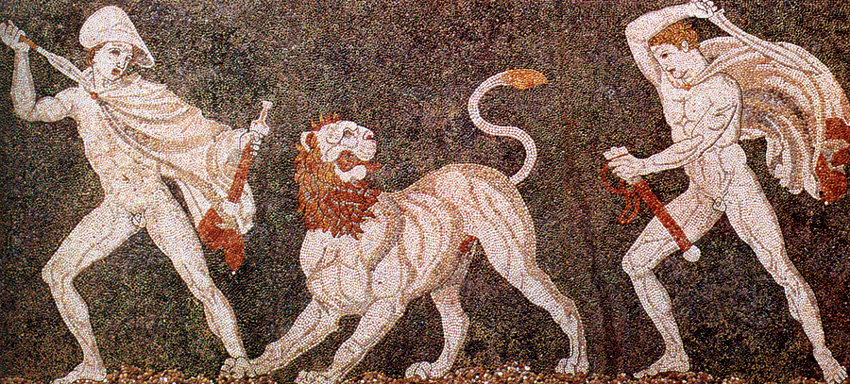
Alexander (left), wearing a kausia and fighting an Asiatic lion with his friend Craterus; late 4th century BC mosaic, Archaeological Museum of Pella, Macedonia

Aside from metalwork and painting, mosaics serve as another significant form of surviving Macedonian artwork, especially those discovered at Pella dating to the 4th century BC. The Stag Hunt Mosaic of Pella, with its three dimensional qualities and illusionist style, show clear influence from painted artwork and wider Hellenistic art trends, although the rustic theme of hunting was tailored for Macedonian tastes. The similar Lion Hunt Mosaic of Pella illustrates either a scene of Alexander the Great with his companion Craterus, or simply a conventional illustration of the generic royal diversion of hunting. Mosaics with mythological themes include scenes of Dionysus riding a panther and Helen of Troy being abducted by Theseus, the latter of which employs illusionist qualities and realistic shading similar to Macedonian paintings. Common themes of Macedonian paintings and mosaics include warfare, hunting and aggressive masculine sexuality (i.e. abduction of women for rape or marriage). In some instances these themes are combined within the same work, indicating a metaphorical connection that seems to be affirmed by later Byzantine Greek literature.

=== Theatre, music and performing arts ===
Philip II was assassinated by his bodyguard Pausanias of Orestis in 336 BC at the theatre of Aigai, Macedonia amid games and spectacles held inside that celebrated the marriage of his daughter Cleopatra of Macedon. Alexander the Great was allegedly a great admirer of both theatre and music. He was especially fond of the plays by Classical Athenian tragedians Aeschylus, Sophocles, and Euripides, whose works formed part of a proper Greek education for his new eastern subjects alongside studies in the Greek language and epics of Homer. While he and his army were stationed at Tyre (in modern-day Lebanon), Alexander had his generals act as judges not only for athletic contests but also stage performances of Greek tragedies. The contemporaneous famous actors Thessalus and Athenodorus performed at the event, despite Athenodorus risking a fine for being absent from the simultaneous Dionysia festival of Athens where he was scheduled to perform (a fine that his patron Alexander agreed to pay).

Music was also appreciated in Macedonia. In addition to the agora, the gymnasium, the theatre, and religious sanctuaries and temples dedicated to Greek gods and goddesses, one of the main markers of a true Greek city in the empire of Alexander the Great was the presence of an odeon for musical performances. This was the case not only for Alexandria in Egypt, but also cities as distant as Ai-Khanoum in what is now modern-day Afghanistan.

=== Literature, education, philosophy, and patronage ===
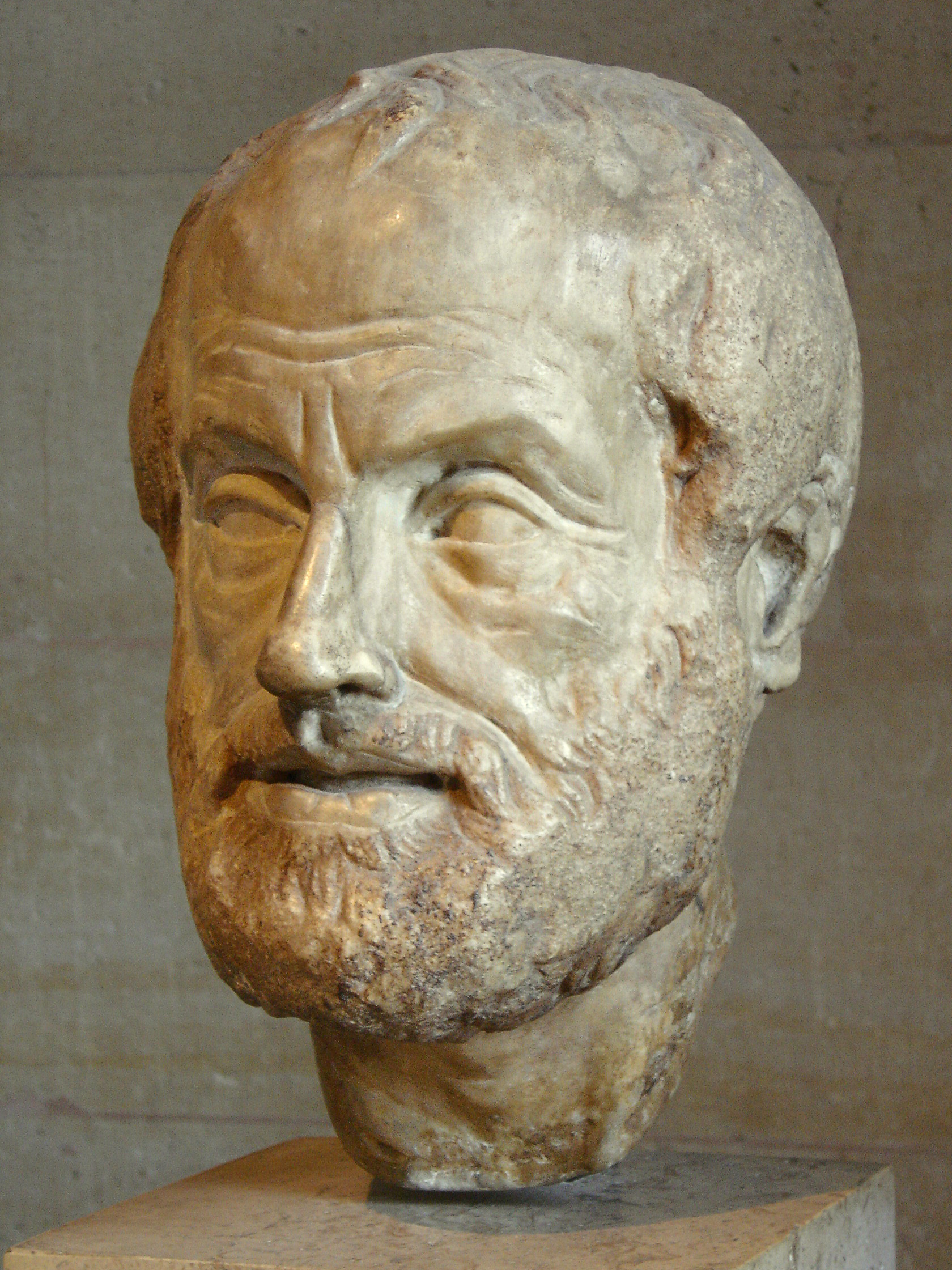
Portrait bust of Aristotle; an Imperial Roman (1st or 2nd century AD) copy of a lost bronze sculpture made by Lysippos.

Perdiccas II of Macedon was able to host well-known Classical Greek intellectual visitors at his royal court, such as the lyric poet Melanippides and the renowned medical doctor Hippocrates, while Pindar's enkomion written for Alexander I of Macedon may have been composed at his court. Yet Archelaus I of Macedon received a far greater number of Greek scholars, artists, and celebrities at his court than his predecessors, leading M. B. Hatzopoulos to describe Macedonia under his reign as an "active centre of Hellenic culture." His honored guests included the painter Zeuxis, the architect Callimachus, the poets Choerilus of Samos, Timotheus of Miletus, and Agathon, as well as the famous Athenian playwright Euripides. Although Archelaus was criticized by the philosopher Plato, supposedly hated by Socrates, and the first known Macedonian king to be insulted with the label of a barbarian, the historian Thucydides held the Macedonian king in glowing admiration for his accomplishments, including his engagement in panhellenic sports and fostering of literary culture. The philosopher Aristotle, who studied at the Platonic Academy of Athens and established the Aristotelian school of thought, moved to Macedonia, and is said to have tutored the young Alexander the Great, in addition to serving as an esteemed diplomat for Alexander's father Philip II. Among Alexander's retinue of artists, writers, and philosophers was Pyrrho of Elis, founder of Pyrrhonism, the school of philosophical skepticism. During the Antigonid period, Antigonos Gonatas fostered cordial relationships with Menedemos of Eretria, founder of the Eretrian school of philosophy, and Zenon, the founder of Stoicism.

In terms of early Greek historiography and later Roman historiography, Felix Jacoby identified thirteen possible ancient historians who wrote histories about Macedonia in his Fragmente der griechischen Historiker. Aside from accounts in the works of Herodotus and Thucydides, the works compiled by Jacoby are only fragmentary, whereas other works are completely lost, such as the history of an Illyrian war fought by Perdiccas III of Macedon written by the Macedonian general and statesman Antipater. The Macedonian historians Marsyas of Pella and Marsyas of Philippi wrote histories of Macedonia, while the Ptolemaic king Ptolemy I Soter authored a history about Alexander and Hieronymus of Cardia wrote a history about Alexander's royal successors. Following the Indian campaign of Alexander the Great, the Macedonian military officer Nearchus wrote a work of his voyage from the mouth of the Indus river to the Persian Gulf. The Macedonian historian Craterus published a compilation of decrees made by the popular assembly of the Athenian democracy, ostensibly while attending the school of Aristotle. Philip V of Macedon had manuscripts of the history of Philip II written by Theopompus gathered by his court scholars and disseminated with further copies.

=== Sports and leisure ===
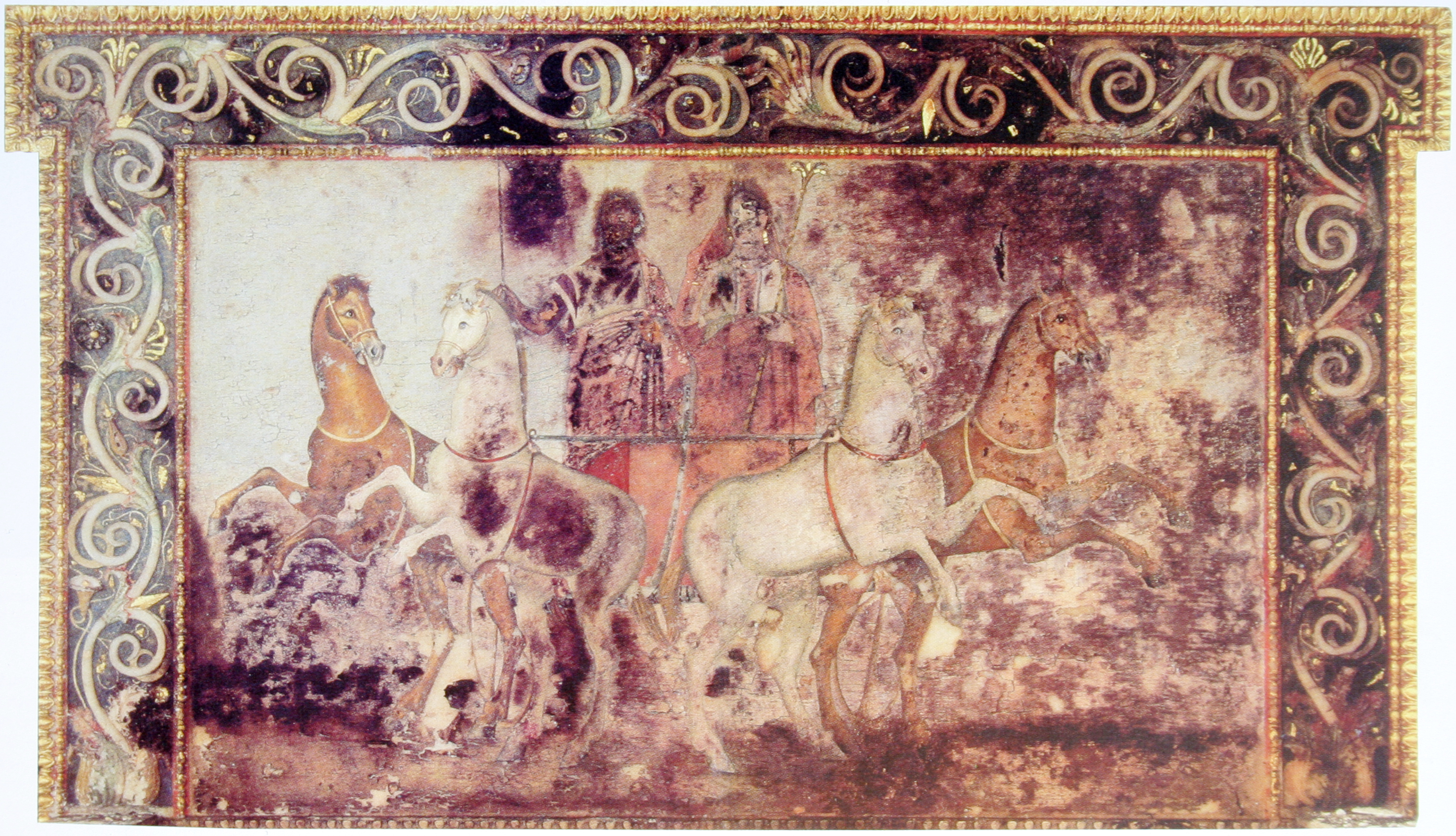
A fresco showing Hades and Persephone riding in a chariot, from the tomb of Queen Eurydice I of Macedon at Vergina, Greece, 4th century BC

When Alexander I of Macedon petitioned to compete in the foot race of the ancient Olympic Games, the event organizers at first denied his request, explaining that only Greeks were allowed to compete. However, Alexander I produced proof of an Argead royal genealogy showing ancient Argive Temenid lineage, a move that ultimately convinced the Olympic Hellanodikai authorities of his Greek descent and ability to compete, although this did not necessarily apply to common Macedonians outside of his royal dynasty. By the end of the 5th century BC, the Macedonian king Archelaus I was crowned with the olive wreath at both Olympia and Delphi (in the Pythian Games) for winning chariot racing contests. Philip II allegedly heard of the Olympic victory of his horse (in either an individual horse race or chariot race) on the same day his son Alexander the Great was born, on either 19 or 20 July 356 BC. In addition to literary contests, Alexander the Great also staged competitions for music and athletics across his empire. The Macedonians created their own athletic games and, after the late 4th century BC, non-royal Macedonians competed and became victors in the Olympic Games and other athletic events such as the Argive Heraean Games. However, athletics were a less favored pastime compared to hunting.

=== Dining and cuisine ===
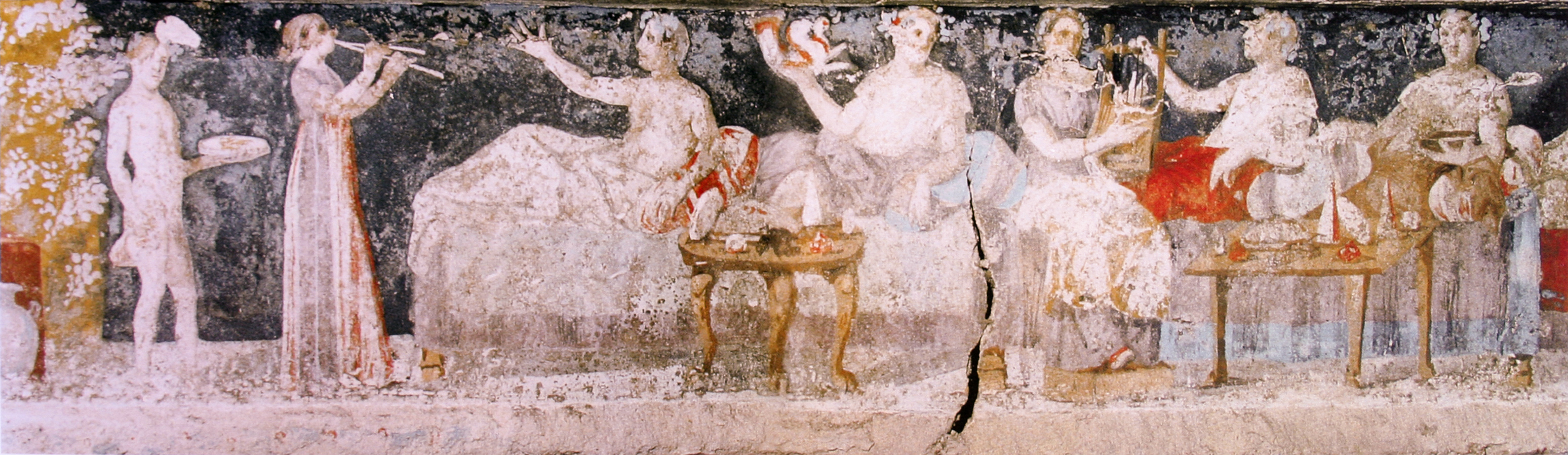
A banquet scene from a Macedonian tomb of Agios Athanasios, Thessaloniki, 4th century BC; six men are shown reclining on couches, with food arranged on nearby tables, a male servant in attendance, and female musicians providing entertainment.

Ancient Macedonia produced very few fine foods or beverages that were highly appreciated elsewhere in the Greek world, namely eels from the Strymonian Gulf and special wine brewed in Chalcidice. The earliest known use of flat bread as a plate for meat was made in Macedonia during the 3rd century BC, which perhaps influenced the later 'trencher' bread of medieval Europe if not Greek pita and Italian pizza. Cattle and goats were consumed, although there was no notice of Macedonian mountain cheeses in literature until the Middle Ages. As exemplified by works such as the plays by the comedic playwright Menander, Macedonian dining habits penetrated Athenian high society; for instance, the introduction of meats into the dessert course of a meal. The Macedonians also most likely introduced mattye to Athenian cuisine, a dish usually made of chicken or other spiced, salted, and sauced meats served during the wine course. This particular dish was derided and connected with licentiousness and drunkenness in a play by the Athenian comic poet Alexis about the declining morals of Athenians in the age of Demetrius I of Macedon.

The symposium (plural: symposia) in the Macedonian and wider Greek realm was a banquet for the nobility and privileged class, an occasion for feasting, drinking, entertainment, and sometimes philosophical discussion. The hetairoi, leading members of the Macedonian aristocracy, were expected to attend such feasts with their king. They were also expected to accompany him on royal hunts for the acquisition of game meat as well as for sport. Symposia had several functions, amongst which was providing relief from the hardship of battle and marching. Symposia were Greek traditions since Homeric times, providing a venue for interaction amongst Macedonian elites. An ethos of egalitarianism surrounded symposia, allowing all male elites to express ideas and concerns, although built-up rivalries and excessive drinking often led to quarrels, fighting and even murder. The degree of extravagance and propensity for violence set Macedonian symposia apart from classical Greek symposia. Like symposia, hunting was another focus of elite activity, and it remained popular throughout Macedonia's history. Young men participating in symposia were only allowed to recline after having killed their first wild boar.

=== Language ===
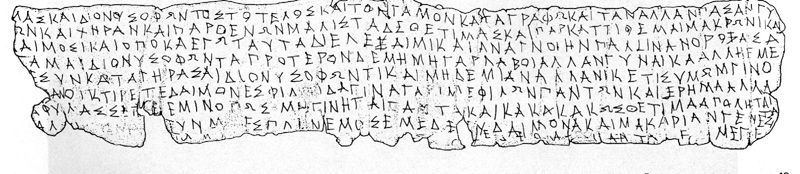
The Pella curse tablet (Greek katadesmos): from Prof. Radcliffe G. Edmonds III, Bryn Mawr College.

For administrative and political purposes, Attic Greek seems to have operated as a lingua franca among the ethno-linguistically diverse communities of Macedonia and the north Aegean region, creating a diglossic linguistic area. (Note: There were Dorian and Euboean colonies, as well as tribal ethne speaking Greek, Illyrian, Thracian, Paeonian, Brygian, etc.) Attic Greek was standardized as the language of the court, formal discourse and diplomacy from as early as the time of Archelaus at the end of the 5th century BC. Attic was further spread by Macedonia's conquests. Although Macedonian continued to be spoken well into Antigonid times, it became the prevalent oral dialect in Macedonia and throughout the Macedonian-ruled Hellenistic world. However, Macedonian became extinct in either the Hellenistic or the Roman period, and entirely replaced by Koine Greek. For instance, Cleopatra VII Philopator, the last active ruler of the Ptolemaic dynasty in Egypt, spoke Koine Greek as a first language, and by her reign (51–30 BC), or some time before it, the Macedonian language was no longer used.

Attempts to classify Ancient Macedonian are hindered by the lack of surviving Ancient Macedonian texts; it was a mainly oral language and most archaeological inscriptions indicate that in Macedonia there was no dominant written language besides Attic and later Koine Greek. All surviving epigraphical evidence from grave markers and public inscriptions is in Greek. Classification attempts are based on a vocabulary of 150–200 words and 200 personal names assembled mainly from the 5th century lexicon of Hesychius of Alexandria and a few surviving fragmentary inscriptions, coins and occasional passages in ancient sources. Most of the vocabulary is regular Greek, with tendencies toward Doric Greek and Aeolic Greek. There can be found some Illyrian and Thracian elements.

The Pella curse tablet, which was found in 1986 at Pella and dates to the mid-4th century BC or slightly earlier, is believed to be the only substantial attested text in Macedonian. The language of the tablet is a distinctly recognizable form of Northwest Greek. The tablet has been used to support the argument that ancient Macedonian was a Northwest Greek dialect and mainly a Doric Greek dialect. Hatzopoulos's analysis revealed some tendencies toward the Aeolic Greek dialect. Hatzopoulos also states that the native language of the ancient Macedonians also betrays a slight phonetic influence from the languages of the original inhabitants of the region who were assimilated or expelled by the invading Macedonians. He also asserts that little is known about the languages of these original inhabitants aside from Phrygian spoken by the Bryges, who migrated to Anatolia. However, according to Hatzopoulos, Bruno Helly expanded and improved his own earlier suggestion and presented the hypothesis of a (North-)'Achaean' substratum extending as far north as the head of the Thermaic Gulf, which had a continuous relation in prehistoric times, both in Thessaly and Macedonia, with the Northwest Greek-speaking populations living on the other side of the Pindus mountain range, and contacts became cohabitation when the Argead Macedonians completed their wandering from Orestis to Lower Macedonia, in the 7th century BC. According to this hypothesis, Hatzopoulos concludes that the Ancient Macedonian dialect of the historical period, attested in inscriptions such as Pella curse tablet, is a sort of koine resulting from the interaction and the influences of various elements, the most important of which are the North-Achaean substratum, the Northwest Greek dialect of the Argead Macedonians, and the Thracian and Phrygian adstrata. Claude Brixhe espoused the hypothesis "of a sporadic secondary voicing of unvoiced consonants within the history of Greek", in agreement with Hatzopoulos.

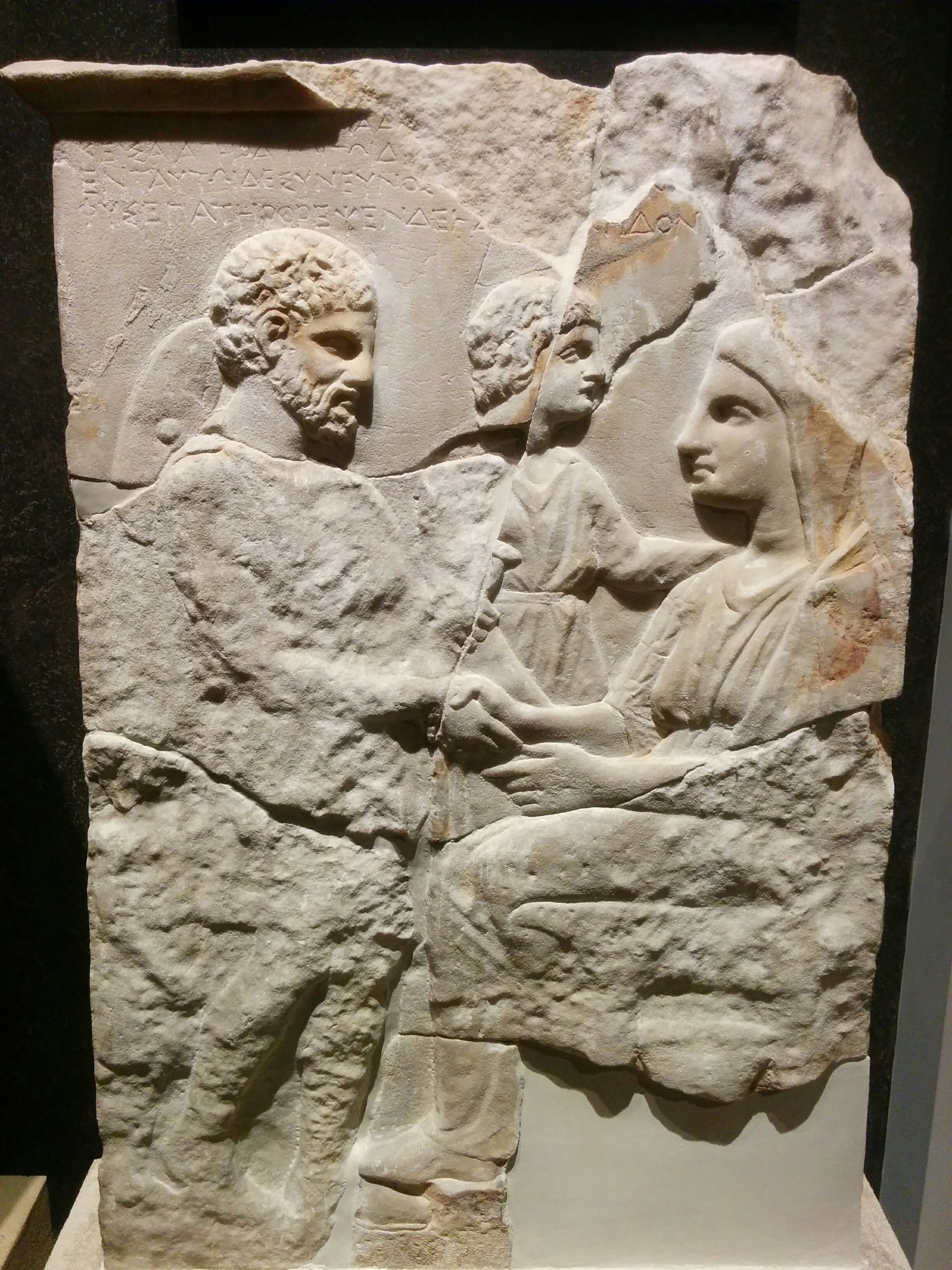
An ancient Macedonian funerary stele, with an epigram written at the top, mid 4th century B.C., Vergina, Macedonia, Greece

In Macedonian onomastics, most personal names are recognizably Greek (e.g. Alexandros, Philippos, Dionysios, Apollonios, Demetrios), with some dating back to Homeric (e.g. Ptolemaeos) or Mycenean times and there are also a few non-Greek names (Illyrian or Thracian; e.g. "Bithys"). This material supports the observation that Macedonian personal names have a predominantly Greek character. Macedonian toponyms and hydronyms are mostly of Greek origin (e.g. Aegae, Dion, Pieria, Haliacmon), as are the names of the months of the Macedonian calendar and the names of most of the deities the Macedonians worshiped. Hammond states that these are not late borrowings.

Macedonian has a close structural and lexical affinity with other Greek dialects, especially Northwest Greek and Thessalian. Most of the words are Greek, although some of these could represent loans or cognate forms. Alternatively, a number of phonological, lexical and onomastic features set Macedonian apart. These latter features, possibly representing traces of a substrate language, occur in what are considered to be particularly conservative systems of the language.

Several hypotheses have consequently been proposed as to the position of Macedonian, all of which broadly regard it as either a peripheral Greek dialect, a closely related but separate language (see Hellenic languages), or a hybridized idiom incorporating Brygian, Northwest Greek and Thessalian Greek. Drawing on the similarities between Macedonian, Greek and Brygian, Fanula Papazoglu wrote that she formed an Indo-European macro-dialectical group, which, according to Georgiev, split before circa 14th–13th century BC before the appearance of the main Greek dialects. The same data has been analyzed in an alternative manner, which regards the formation of the main Greek dialects as a later convergence of related but distinct groups. According to this theory, Macedonian did not fully participate in this process, making its ultimate position—other than being a contiguous, related 'minor' language—difficult to define. Hatzopoulos, who offers a critical review of recent research on Macedonian speech, argues that all available evidence points to the conclusion that Macedonian is a Greek dialect of the North-West group.

Another source of evidence is metalinguistics and the question of mutual intelligibility. The available literary evidence has no details about the exact nature of Macedonian; however it suggests that Macedonian and Greek were sufficiently different that there were communication difficulties between Greek and Macedonian contingents, necessitating the use of interpreters as late as the time of Alexander the Great. Based on this evidence, Papazoglou has written that Macedonian could not have been a Greek dialect, however, evidence for non-intelligibility exists for other ancient Greek dialects such as Aetolian and Aeolic Greek. Hornblower suggests that Greeks were intelligible to Macedonians without an interpreter, as supported by the Athenian orator Aeschines. Livy wrote that when Aemilius Paulus called together representatives of the defeated Macedonian communities, his Latin pronouncements were translated for the benefit of the assembled Macedonians into Greek. According to Hatzopoulos, the sole direct attestation of Macedonian speech preserved in an ancient author, is a verse in a non-Attic Greek dialect that the 4th century BC Athenian poet Strattis in his comedy 'The Macedonians' places a character, presumably Macedonian, to give as an answer to the question of an Athenian: – ἡ σφύραινα δ’ ἐστὶ τίς; (‘the sphyraena, what's that?’) – κέστραν μὲν ὔμμες, ὡτικκοί, κικλήσκετε (‘it's what ye in Attica dub cestra’). Georgios Giannakis writes that recent scholarship has established the position of ancient Macedonian within the dialect map of North-West Greek.

== Identity ==
The Vergina Sun has been proposed as a symbol of ancient Macedonia or of the Argead dynasty by archeologists.

=== Nature of sources ===
Most ancient sources on the Macedonians come from outside Macedonia. According to Eugene N. Borza, most of these sources are either ill-informed, hostile or both, making the Macedonians one of the "silent" peoples of the ancient Mediterranean. Most of the literary evidence comes from later sources focusing on the campaigns of Alexander the Great rather than on Macedonia itself. For example, Ernst Badian notes that nearly all surviving references to antagonisms and differences between Greeks and Macedonians found in Arrian's Anabasis of Alexander, where they are described as belonging to different génē, and the latter as being distinct from both Greeks and barbarians, are traced back to speeches that were composed by Arrian himself; Arrian wrote approximately 500 years after Alexander's campaign, during a period (i.e. the Roman Empire) in which any notion of an ethnic disparity between Macedonians and other Greeks was incomprehensible. Most contemporaneous evidence on Philip is Athenian and hostile. Moreover, most ancient sources focus on the deeds of Macedonian kings in connection with political and military events such as the Peloponnesian War. Evidence about the ethnic identity of Macedonians of lower social status from the Archaic to the Hellenistic period is highly fragmentary and unsatisfactory. For information about Macedonia before Philip, historians must rely on archaeological inscriptions and material remains, a few fragments from historians whose work is now lost, occasional passing mentions in Herodotus and Thucydides, and universal histories from the Roman era.

=== Ancient sources on the Argeads ===
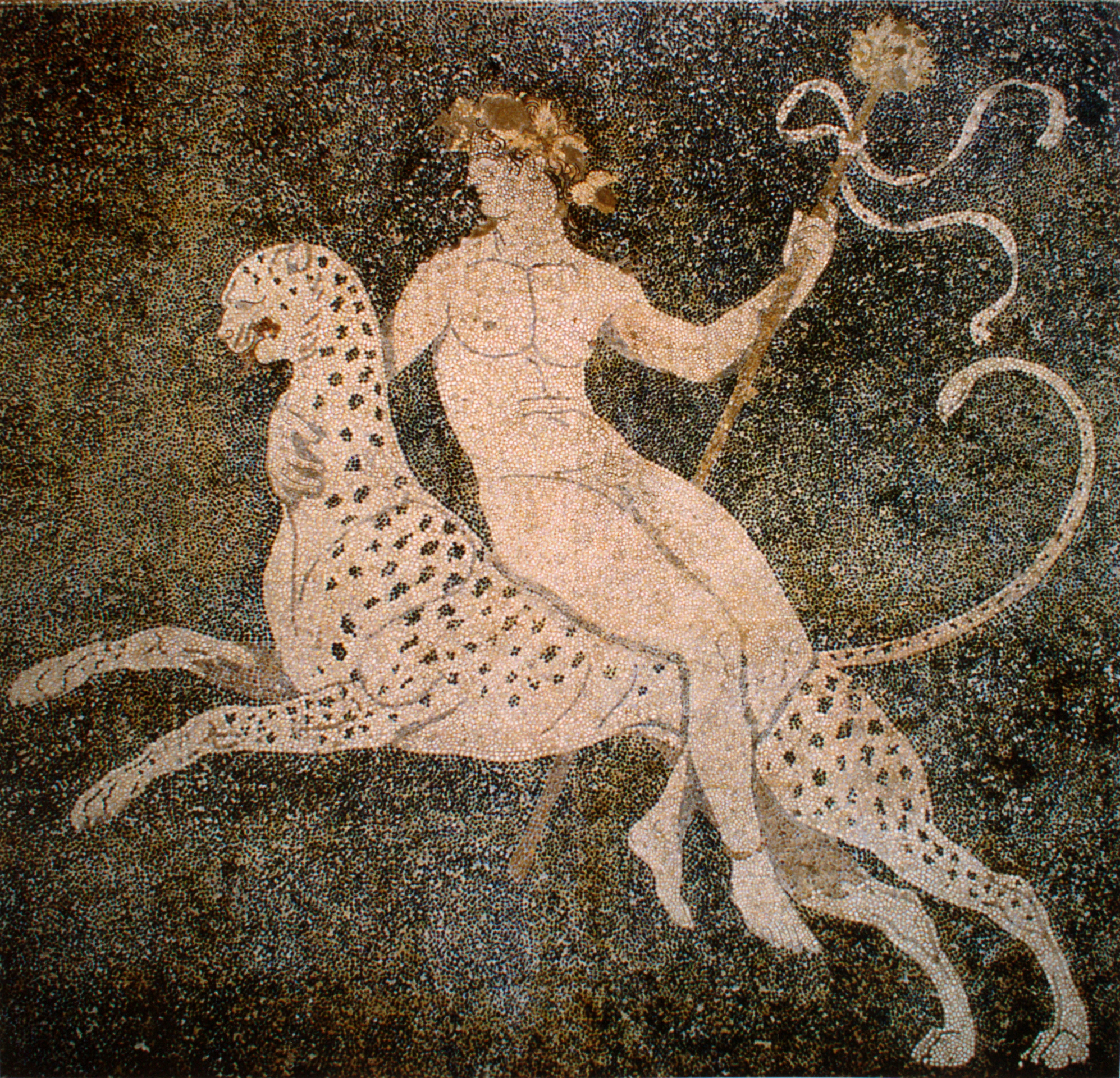
The god Dionysos riding a cheetah, mosaic floor in the "House of Dionysos" at Pella, Greece, c. 330–300 BC

In Homer, the term Argead was used as a collective designation for the Greeks ("Ἀργείων Δαναῶν", Argive Danaans). The earliest version of the Temenid foundation myth was circulated by Alexander I via Herodotus during his apparent appearance at the Olympic Games. Despite protests from some competitors, the Hellanodikai ("Judges of the Greeks") accepted Alexander's Greek genealogy, as did Herodotus and later Thucydides. Alexander had proved to the judges that he was an Argive Greek (descendant from the mythical king of Argos, Temenus). Surviving fragments of the Pindaric ode seem to confirm his participation, by praising "his pentathlon victory". Nevertheless, the historicity of Alexander I's participation in the Olympics has been doubted by some scholars, who see the story as a piece of propaganda engineered by the Argeads and spread by Herodotus. Alexander's name does not appear in any list of Olympic victors. That there were protests from other competitors suggests that the supposed Argive genealogy of the Argeads "was far from mainstream knowledge". Although some have formulated that the appellation "Philhellene" was "surely not an appellation that could be given to an actual Greek", ancient Greek authors had confirmed that the term "philhellene" (fond of Greece) was also used as a title for Greek patriots. Whatever the case, according to Hall, "what mattered was that Alexander had played the genealogical game à la grecque and played it well, perhaps even excessively".

The emphasis on the Heraclean ancestry of the Argeads served to heroicize the royal family and to provide a sacred genealogy which established a "divine right to rule" over their subjects. The Macedonian royal family, like those of Epirus, emphasized "blood and kinship in order to construct for themselves a heroic genealogy that sometimes also functioned as a Hellenic genealogy".

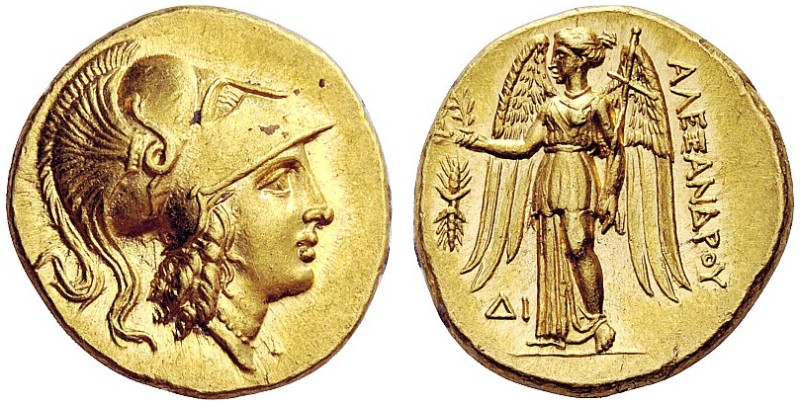
Gold Macedonian stater of Alexander the Great, struck at the Memphis mint, dated c. 332–323 BC. Obv: Goddess Athena wearing Corinthian helmet. Rev: Goddess Nike standing.

Pre-Hellenistic Greek writers expressed an ambiguity about the Greekness of Macedonians —specifically their monarchic institutions and their background of Persian alliance—often portraying them as a potential barbarian threat to Greece. For example, the late 5th century sophist Thrasymachus of Chalcedon wrote, "we Greeks are enslaved to the barbarian Archelaus" (Fragment 2). This fragment is an adaptation of a verse from Euripides' tragedy Telephos which was destined to become a stock expression. Hatzopoulos states that given the fragment's conventional character, it can hardly be taken literally as ethnological or linguistic evidence. The issue of Macedonian Hellenicity and that of their royal house was particularly pertinent in the 4th century BC regarding the politics of invading Persia. Demosthenes regarded Macedonia's monarchy to be incongruous with an Athenian-led Pan-Hellenic alliance. He castigated Philip II for being "not only no Greek, nor related to the Greeks, but not even a barbarian from any place that can be named with honor, but a pestilent knave from Macedonia, whence it was never yet possible to buy a decent slave".

This was obvious political slander and is regarded as "an insulting speech", but "the orator clearly could not do this, if his audience was likely to regard his claim as nonsense: it could not be said of a Theban, or even a Thessalian"; however, he also calls Meidias, an Athenian statesman, "barbarian" and in an event mentioned by Athenaeus, the Boeotians, the Thessalians and the Eleans were labeled "barbarians". Demosthenes regarded only those who had reached the cultural standards of southern Greece as Greek and he did not take ethnological criteria into consideration, and his corpus is considered by Eugene N. Borza as an "oratory designed to sway public opinion at Athens and thereby to formulate public policy." Isocrates believed that only Macedonia was capable of leading a war against Persia; he felt compelled to say that Phillip was a "bona fide" Hellene by discussing his Argead and Heraclean heritage. Aeschines also sought to defend Philip and publicly described him at a meeting of the Athenian popular assembly as being "entirely Greek". Moreover, Philip, in his letter to the council and people of Athens, mentioned by Demosthenes, places himself "with the rest of the Greeks".

=== Ancient sources on the Macedonian people ===
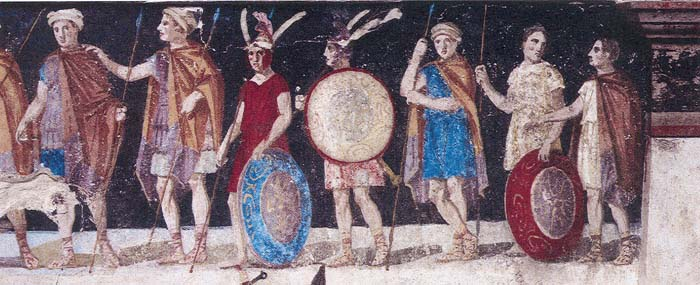
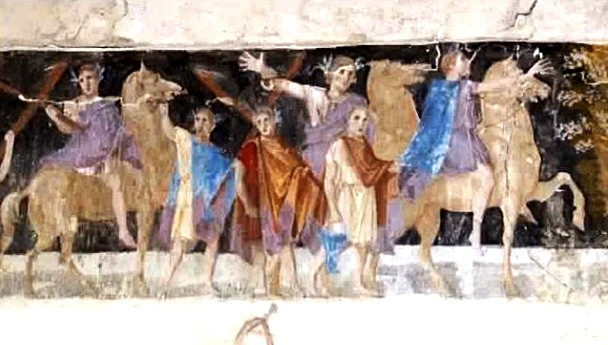
Ancient frescos of Macedonian soldiers from the tomb of Agios Athanasios, Thessaloniki, Greece, 4th century BC

The earliest reference about Greek attitudes towards the Macedonian ethnos as a whole comes from Hesiod's Catalogue of Women. The text maintains that the Macedonians descended from Makedon, son of Zeus and Thyia (daughter of Deucalion), and was therefore a nephew of Hellen, progenitor of the Greeks. Magnes, brother of the eponymous Makedon, was also said to be a son of Zeus and Thyia. The Magnetes, descendants of Magnes, were an Aeolian tribe; according to Hammond this places the Macedonians among the Greeks. Engels also wrote that Hesiod counted the Macedonians as Greeks, while Hall said that "according to strict genealogical logic, [this] excludes the population that bears [Makedon's] name from the ranks of the Hellenes". Two later writers deny Makedon a lineage from Hellen: Apollodorus (3.8.1) makes him a son of Lycaon, son of earth-born Pelasgus, whilst Pseudo–Scymnos (6.22) makes him born directly from the earth; Apollodorus (3.8.1), however, is technically identifying Makedon with the Greek royalty of Arcadia, thus placing Macedonia within the orbit of the most archaic of Greek myths. At the end of the 5th century BC Hellanicus of Lesbos asserted Macedon was the son of Aeolus, the latter a son of Hellen and ancestor of the Aeolians, one of the major tribes of the Greeks. Hellanicus modified Hesiod's genealogy by making Makedon the son of Aeolus, firmly placing the Macedonians in the Aeolic Greek-speaking family. In addition to belonging to tribal groups such as the Aeolians, Dorians, Achaeans, and Ionians, Anson also stresses the fact that some Greeks even distinguished their ethnic identities based on the polis (i.e. city-state) they originally came from.

These early writers and their formulation of genealogical relationships demonstrate that before the 5th century, Greekness was defined on an ethnic basis and was legitimized by tracing descent from eponymous Hellen. Subsequently, cultural considerations assumed greater importance.

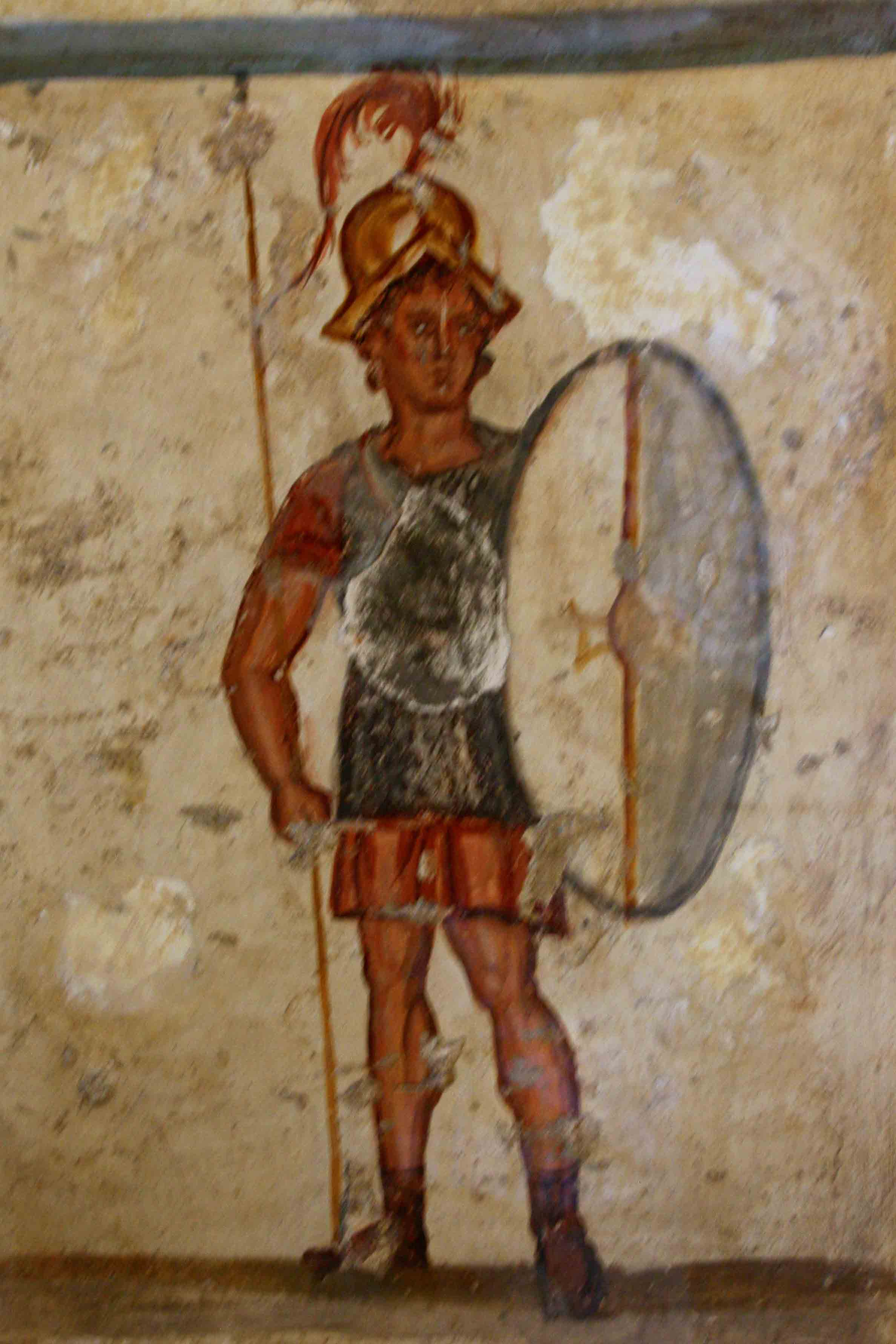
Fresco of an ancient Makedonian soldier (thorakitai) wearing chainmail armor and bearing a thureos shield, 3rd century BC

Herodotus regarded the Macedonians as either northern Greeks, or an intermediate group between "pure" Greeks and barbarians. In the Histories (5.20.4) Herodotus calls king Alexander I an anēr Hellēn, Makedonōn huparchos (Ancient Greek: ἀνὴρ Ἕλλην, Μακεδόνων ὕπαρχος), which translates to either a "Greek viceroy of Macedonia", or "a Greek who ruled over Macedonians". In 7.130.3, he says that the Thessalians were the "first of the Greeks" to submit to Xerxes. In the first book of the Histories, Herodotus recalls a reliable tradition according to which the Greek ethnos, in its wandering, was called "Macedonian" when it settled around Pindus and "Dorian" when it came to the Peloponnese, and in the eighth book he groups several Greek tribes under "Macedonians" and "Dorians", implying that the Macedonians were Greeks.

In parts of his work, Thucydides placed the Macedonians on his cultural continuum closer to barbarians than Hellenes, or an intermediate category between Greeks and non–Greeks. In other parts, he distinguishes between three groups fighting in the Peloponnesian War: The Greeks (including Peloponnesians), the Macedonians and the barbarian Illyrians. Recounting Brasidas' expedition to Lyncus, Thucydides considers Macedonians separate from the barbarians; he says, "In all there were about three thousand Hellenic heavy infantry, accompanied by all the Macedonian cavalry with the Chalcidians, near one thousand strong, besides an immense crowd of barbarians", and "night coming on, the Macedonians and the barbarian crowd took fright in a moment in one of those mysterious panics to which great armies are liable". More explicit is his recounting of Brasidas' speech where he tells his Peloponnesian troops to dispel fear of fighting against "barbarians: because they had already fought against Macedonians". Euripides, in his work Archelaus, tells us that the Macedonians were Greeks.

Ancient geographers differed in their views on the size of Macedonia and on the ethnicity of the Macedonians. Most ancient geographers did not include the core territories of the Macedonian kingdom in their definition of Greece, the reasons for which are unknown. For example, Strabo says that while "Macedonia is of course part of Greece, yet now, since I am following the nature and shape of the places geographically, I have chosen to classify it apart from the rest of Greece". Strabo supports the Greek ethnicity of the Macedonian people and wrote of the "Macedonians and the other Greeks", as does Pausanias, the latter of which did not include Macedonia in Hellas as indicated in Book 10 of his Description of Greece. Pausanias said that the Macedonians took part in the Amphictyonic League and that Caranus of Macedon—the mythical founder of the Argead dynasty—set up a trophy after the Argive fashion for a victory against Cisseus.

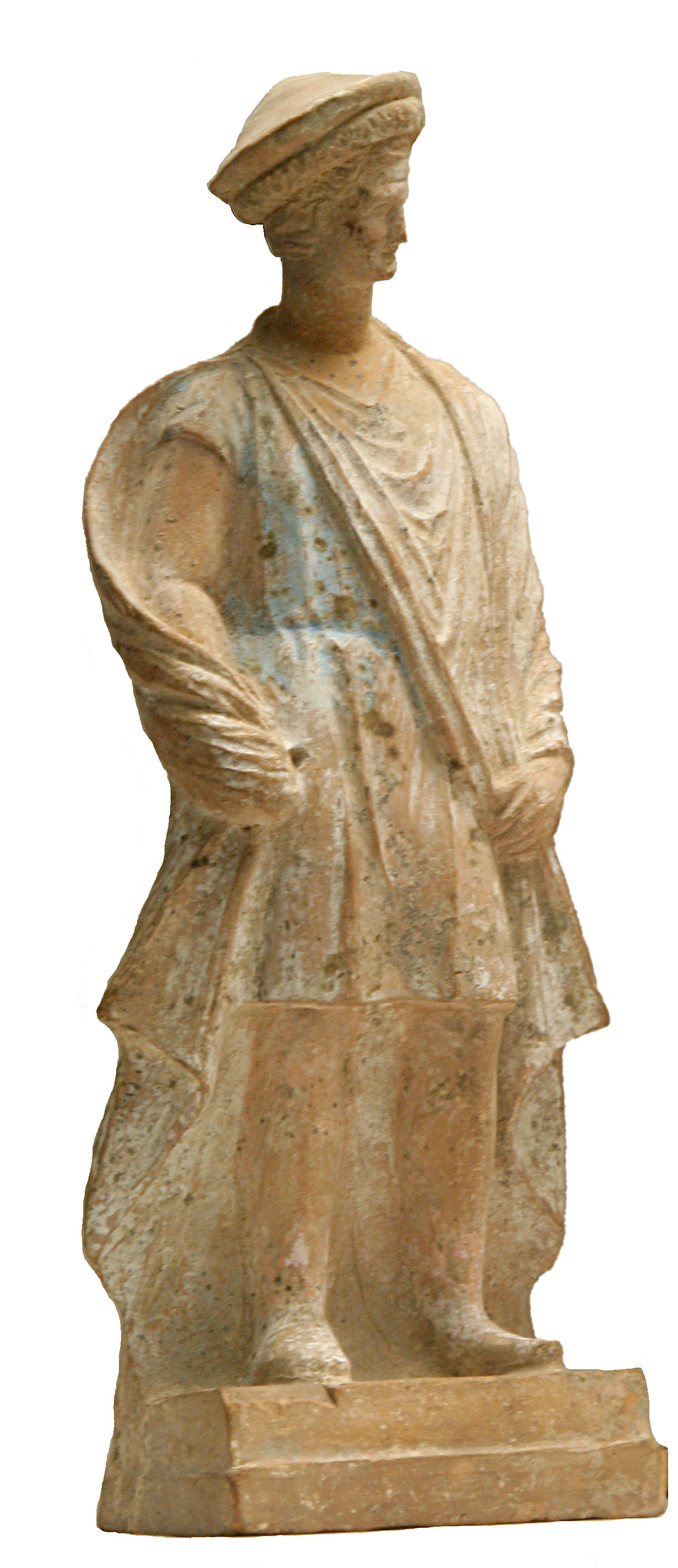
Macedonian terracotta figurine, 3rd century BC; the Persians referred to the Macedonians as "Yaunã Takabara" ("Greeks with hats that look like shields").

Isocrates defended Philip's Greek origins but perhaps did not think the same of his people. In Hall's version, he wrote, "He (Perdiccas I) left the Greek world alone completely, but he desired to hold the kingship in Macedonia; for he understood that Greeks are not accustomed to submit themselves to monarchy whereas others are incapable of living their lives without domination of this sort ... for he alone of the Greeks deemed it fit to rule over an ethnically unrelated population". On the other hand, Michael Cosmopoulos reports that Isocrates clearly states that the Macedonians were Greeks, as in George Norlin's translation, Isocrates describes Perdiccas' people as being rather of "kindred race" with the Greeks. Nevertheless, Philip named the federation of Greek states he created with Macedon at its head—nowadays referred to as the League of Corinth—as simply "The Hellenes" (i.e. Greeks). The Macedonians were granted two seats in the exclusively Greek Great Amphictyonic League in 346 BC when the Phocians were expelled. Badian sees it as a personal honour awarded to Phillip and not to the Macedonian people as a whole. Aeschines said that Phillip's father Amyntas III joined other Greeks in the Panhellenic congress of the Lacedaemonian allies, known as the "Congress of Sparta", in a vote to help Athens recover possession of Amphipolis. The list of theorodokoi (sacred envoy-receivers whose duty was to host and assist the theoroi ("viewers") before the Panhellenic games and festivals), was listing Greek cities and tribes, to which the major Panhellenic sanctuaries sent theoroi in Epidaurus. Amyntas' son and Phillip's older brother, Perdiccas III of Macedon, served as theorodokos in the Panhellenic Games that took place in Epidaurus around 360/359 BC.

With Philip's conquest of Greece, Greeks and Macedonians enjoyed privileges at the royal court, and there was no social distinction among his court hetairoi, although Philip's armies were only ever led by Macedonians. The process of Greek and Macedonian syncretism culminated during the reign of Alexander the Great, and he allowed other Greeks to command his armies. In his speech at the battle of Issus, mentioned in Arrian's Anabasis, Alexander is seen to place himself among the Greeks, further acknowledging that, while the Greek allies of Darius III fight for pay, his own army fights for the Greek cause. The persisting antagonism between Macedonians and other Greeks however, continued into Antigonid times. Some Greek citizens continued to rebel against their Macedonian overlords throughout the Hellenistic era. They rejoiced on the death of Phillip II and they revolted against Alexander's Antigonid successors. The Greeks called this conflict the Hellenic War. However, Pan-Hellenic sloganeering was used by Greeks against Antigonid dominance and also by Macedonians to corral popular support throughout Greece. Those who considered Macedonia as a political enemy, such as Hypereides and Chremonides, likened the Lamian War and Chremonidean War, respectively, to the earlier Greco-Persian Wars and efforts to liberate Greeks from tyranny. Yet even those who considered Macedonia an ally, such as Isocrates, were keen to stress the differences between their kingdom and the Greek city states, to assuage fears about the extension of the Macedonian-style monarchism into the governance of their poleis.

After the 3rd century BC, and especially in Roman times, the Macedonians were consistently regarded as Greeks. To begin with, Polybius considers the Macedonians as Greeks and sets them apart from their neighboring non-Greek tribes. For example, in his Histories, the Acarnanian character Lyciscus tells the Spartans that they are "of the same tribe" as the Achaeans and the Macedonians, who should be honoured because "throughout nearly their whole lives are ceaselessly engaged in a struggle with the barbarians for the safety of the Greeks". Polybius also used the phrase "Macedonia and the rest of Greece", and says that Philip V of Macedon associates himself with "the rest of the Greeks". In his text History of Rome, Livy states that the Macedonians, Aetolians and Acarnanians were "all men of the same language". Similar opinions are shared by Arrian, Dionysius of Halicarnassus, Strabo and Plutarch, who wrote of Aristotle advising Alexander "to have regard for the Greeks as for friends and kindred"; more specifically, to be "a leader to the Greeks and a despot to the barbarians, to look after the former as after friends and relatives, and to deal with the latter as with beasts or plants". M. B. Hatzopoulos points out that passages in Arrian's text also reveal that the terms "Greeks" and "Macedonians" were at times synonymous. For instance, when Alexander the Great held a feast accompanied by Macedonians and Persians, with religious rituals performed by Persian magi and "Greek seers", the latter of whom were Macedonians. Any preconceived ethnic differences between Greeks and Macedonians faded soon after the Roman conquest of Macedonia by 148 BC and then the rest of Greece with the defeat of the Achaean League by the Roman Republic at the Battle of Corinth (146 BC).

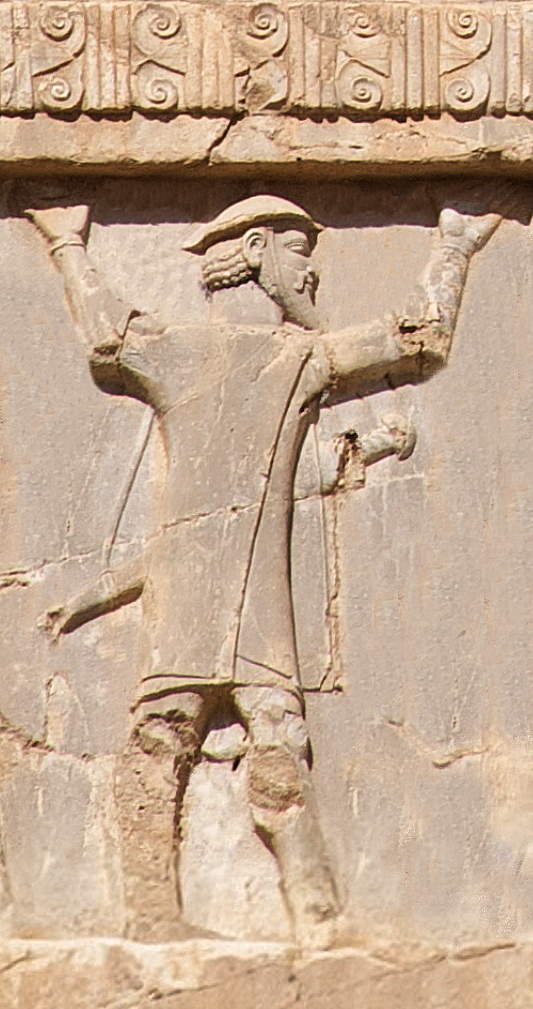
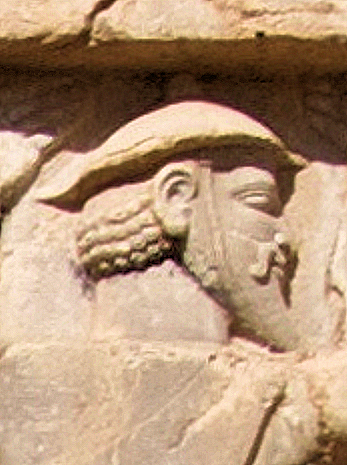
The "Ionians with shield-hats" (Old Persian cuneiform: 𐎹𐎢𐎴𐎠𐏐𐎫𐎣𐎲𐎼𐎠, Yaunā takabarā) depicted on the tomb of Xerxes I at Naqsh-e Rustam, were probably Macedonian soldiers in the service of the Achaemenid army, wearing their characteristic kausia, c.480 BC.

The Persians referred to both Greeks and Macedonians as Yauna ("Ionians", their term for "Greeks"), though they distinguished the "Yauna by the sea and across the sea" from the Yaunã Takabara or "Greeks with hats that look like shields", ostensibly referring to the Macedonian kausia hat. According to another interpretation, the Persians used such terms in a geographical rather than an ethnic sense. Yauna and its various attributes possibly referred to regions to the north and west of Asia Minor. Overall, Persian inscriptions indicate that the Persians considered the Macedonians to be Greeks. In Hellenistic times, most Egyptians and Syrians included the Macedonians among the larger category of Greeks, as the Persians had done earlier.

=== Modern discourse ===
Modern scholarly discourse has produced several hypotheses about the Macedonians' place within the Greek world. Considering material remains of Greek-style monuments, buildings, inscriptions dating from the 5th century and the predominance of Greek personal names, one school of thought says that the Macedonians were "truly Greeks" who had retained a more archaic lifestyle than those living in southern Greece. This cultural discrepancy was used during the political struggles in Athens and Macedonia in the 4th century. This has been the predominant viewpoint since the 20th century. Worthington wrote, "... not much need to be said about the Greekness of ancient Macedonia: it is undeniable", and he concludes that "there is still more than enough evidence and reasoned theory to suggest that the Macedonians were racially Greek." Paul Christesen and Saraj C. Murray wrote that "it is now widely acknowledged that Macedonians were from the outset linguistically and culturally Greek". Miltiades Hatzopoulos argues that there was no real ethnic difference between Macedonians and Greeks, only a political distinction contrived after the creation of the League of Corinth in 337 BC (which was led by Macedonia through the league's elected hegemon Philip II, despite him not being a member of the league itself). Hatzopoulos stresses the fact that Macedonians and other peoples such as the Epirotes and Cypriots, despite speaking a Greek dialect, worshiping in Greek cults, engaging in panhellenic games, and upholding traditional Greek institutions, nevertheless occasionally had their territories excluded from contemporary geographic definitions of "Hellas" and were even considered non-Greek barbarians by some. Panagiotis Filos notes that the term "barbarian" was often used by ancient Greek authors in a very broad sense, referring not only to non-Greek populations, but also to Greek populations on the fringe of the Greek world with dialectal differences, such as the Macedonians. The term was also known for being used in a pejorative and politically motivated manner, especially by the Athenians, to deride other Greek tribes and states such as Epirotes, Eleans, Boeotians and Aeolic-speakers. Other academics who concur that the difference between the Macedonians and Greeks was a political rather than a true ethnic discrepancy include N. G. L. Hammond, Michael B. Sakellariou, Robert Malcolm Errington, Craige B. Champion, Robin Lane Fox, Simon Hornblower, Ian Worthington and Miltiades B. Hatzopoulos. Simon Hornblower writes that "the question 'Were the Macedonians Greeks?' perhaps needs to be chopped up further" and concludes that "the crude one-word answer to the question has to be 'yes'", noting that "Macedonians were Greeks by criteria two and three, that is, religion and language" and "Macedonian customs were in certain respects unlike those of a normal polis, but they were compatible with Greekness, apart, perhaps, from the institutions".

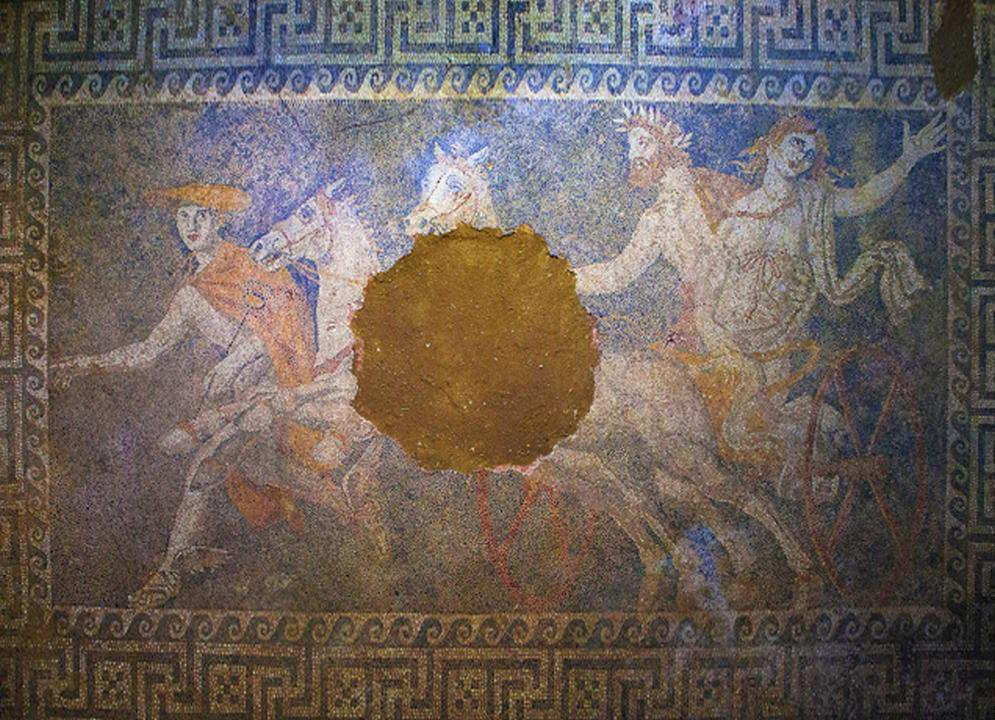
A mosaic of the Kasta Tomb in Amphipolis depicting the abduction of Persephone by Pluto, 4th century BC

Another perspective interprets the literary evidence and the archaeological-cultural differences between Macedonia and central-southern Greece before the 6th century and beyond as evidence that the Macedonians were originally non-Greek tribes who underwent a process of Hellenization, or that "whatever the ethnic origins and identity of the Macedonians, they were generally perceived in their own time by Greeks and themselves not to be Greeks". Eugene Borza emphasized the Macedonians "made their mark in antiquity as Macedonians, not as a tribe of some other people", but argued that "the 'highlanders' or 'Makedones' of the mountainous regions of western Macedonia may have been derived from northwest Greek stock", that "those who emerged into the lowlands were to be distinguished from the rest of the Makedones who remained in the mountain cantons by the name Argeadae", and that "the Macedonians themselves may have originated from the same population pool that produced other Greek peoples". Accepting that political factors played a part, they highlight the degree of antipathy between Macedonians and Greeks, which was of a different quality to that seen among other Greek states—even those with a long-term history of mutual animosity (e.g. Sparta and Athens). According to these scholars, the Macedonians came to be regarded as "northern Greeks" only with the ongoing Hellenization of Macedonia and the emergence of Rome as a common enemy in the west. This coincides with the period during which ancient authors such as Polybius and Strabo called the ancient Macedonians "Greeks". By this point, to have been a Greek could have defined a quality of culture and intelligence rather than a racial or ethnic affinity. Roger D. Woodard asserts that in addition to persisting uncertainty in modern times about the proper classification of the Macedonian language and its relation to Greek, ancient authors also presented conflicting ideas, such as Demosthenes when labeling Philip II of Macedon inaccurately as a "barbarian", whereas Polybius called the Achaeans and Macedonians as homophylos (i.e. part of the same race or kin). Carol J. King elaborates that finding the reason why "ancient Greeks themselves differentiated between Greeks and Macedonians" is limited by the fact that "if one seeks historical truth about an ancient people who have left no definitive record, one may have to let go of the hope for a definitive answer" especially considering that ancient Macedonia was composed of Greeks, people akin to Greeks and non-Greeks.

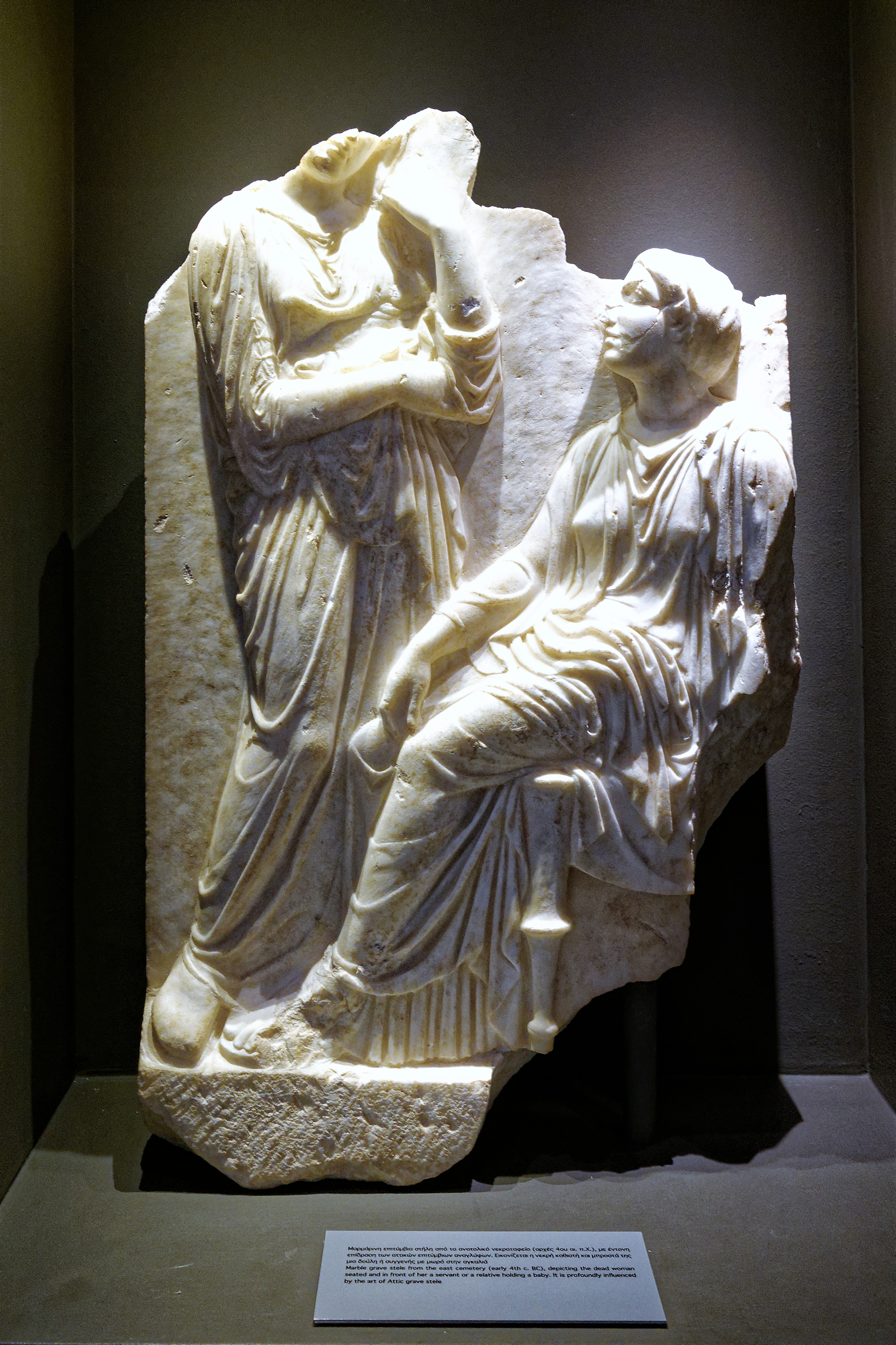
Funerary marble stela from Pella with Attic influence, 4th-century BC, now kept in the Archaeological Museum of Pella.

Others have adopted both views. According to Sansone, "there is no question that, in the fifth and fourth centuries, there were noticeable difference between the Greeks and the Macedonians," yet the issue of Macedonian Hellenicity was ultimately a "political one". Hall adds, "to ask whether the Macedonians 'really were' Greek or not in antiquity is ultimately a redundant question given the shifting semantics of Greekness between the 6th and 4th centuries BC. What cannot be denied, however, is that the cultural commodification of Hellenic identity that emerged in the 4th century might have remained a provincial artifact, confined to the Balkan peninsula, had it not been for the Macedonians." In the context of ethnic origins of the companions of the Antigonid kings, James L. O'Neil distinguishes Macedonians and Greeks as separate ethnic groups, the latter becoming more prominent in Macedonian affairs and the royal court after Alexander the Great's reign, but he also points to the Pella curse tablet as evidence that a form of Doric Greek was spoken in Macedon, that was different from any of the West Greek dialects of areas neighboring Macedon. Anson argues that some Hellenic authors expressed complex if not ever-changing and ambiguous ideas about the exact ethnic identity of the Macedonians, who were considered by some as barbarians, and by others as semi-Greek or fully Greek, while noting that "Macedonia and the southern Greeks shared most of the same gods" and "the evidence suggests that the language spoken by most Macedonians was a dialect of Greek and had been for centuries".

== See also ==
- Demographic history of Macedonia
- Government of Macedonia (ancient kingdom) – Political history topic
- History of Macedonia (ancient kingdom)
- Macedonians (Greeks) – Greek regional and historical population group
- Macednon – Ancient Greek ethnic group

== Sources ==
- Adams, Winthrop Lindsay (2010). "Alexander's Successors to 221 BC". In Roisman, Joseph; Worthington, Ian (eds.). A Companion to Ancient Macedonia. Oxford, Chichester, & Malden: Wiley-Blackwell. pp. 208–224. ISBN 978-1-4051-7936-2.
- Aldrete, Gregory S.; Bartell, Scott; Aldrete, Alicia (2013). Reconstructing Ancient Linen Body Armor: Unraveling the Linothorax Mystery. Baltimore: Johns Hopkins University Press. ISBN 978-1-4214-0819-4.
- Anson, Edward M. (2010). "Why Study Ancient Macedonia and What This Companion is About". In Roisman, Joseph; Worthington, Ian (eds.). A Companion to Ancient Macedonia. Oxford, Chichester, & Malden: Wiley-Blackwell. pp. 3–20. ISBN 978-1-4051-7936-2.
- Archibald, Zosia (2010). "Macedonia and Thrace". In Roisman, Joseph; Worthington, Ian (eds.). A Companion to Ancient Macedonia. Oxford, Chichester, & Malden: Wiley-Blackwell. pp. 326–341. ISBN 978-1-4051-7936-2.
- Ashley, J.R. (2004). The Macedonian Empire: The Era of Warfare Under Philip II and Alexander the Great, 359–323 B.C. McFarland. ISBN 0786419180.
- Asirvatham, Sulochana R. (2010). "Perspectives on the Macedonians from Greece, Rome, and Beyond". In Roisman, Joseph; Worthington, Ian (eds.). A Companion to Ancient Macedonia. Oxford, Chichester, & Malden: Wiley-Blackwell. pp. 99–124. ISBN 978-1-4051-7936-2.
- Badian, Ernst (1982). "Greeks and Macedonians". Studies in the History of Art. SYMPOSIUM SERIES I. 10. National Gallery of Art: 33–51. JSTOR 42617918.
- Badian, Ernst; Wallace, Robert W.; Harris, Edward Monroe (1996). Transitions to Empire: Essays in Greco-Roman History, 360-146 B.C. in Honor of E. Badian. Norman: University of Oklahoma Press. ISBN 0-8061-2863-1.
- Barr-Sharrar, Beryl; Borza, Eugene N. (1982). Macedonia and Greece in Late Classical and Early Hellenistic Times. National Gallery of Art. ISBN 0-89468-005-6.
- Beekes, Robert S. P. (2009). Etymological Dictionary of Greek. Brill. ISBN 978-90-04-32186-1.
- Best, Jan; de Vries, Nanny (1989). Thracians and Mycenaeans: Proceedings of the Fourth International Congress of Thracology, Rotterdam, 24-26 September 1984. Leiden, The Netherlands: E.J. Brill. ISBN 90-04-08864-4.
- Boardman, John (1982). The Cambridge Ancient History - Volume 3, Part 1: The Prehistory of the Balkans and the Middle East and the Aegean World, Tenth to Eighth Centuries B.C. Cambridge, UK: Cambridge University Press. ISBN 0-521-22496-9.
- Borza, Eugene N. (1982). "Athenians, Macedonians and the Origins of the Macedonian Royal House". Studies in Attic Epigraphy, History and Topography. 19.
- Borza, Eugene N. (1992). In the Shadow of Olympus: The Emergence of Macedon. Princeton, NJ: Princeton University Press. ISBN 0-691-00880-9.
- Borza, Eugene N. (1995). Makedonika. Claremont, CA: Regina Books. ISBN 978-0-941690-64-5.
- Borza, Eugene N. (1999). Before Alexander: Constructing Early Macedonia. Claremont, CA: Regina Books. ISBN 0-941690-96-2.
- Bringmann, Klaus (2007) [2002]. A History of the Roman Republic. Translated by Smyth, W. J. Cambridge & Malden: Polity Press. ISBN 978-0-7456-3371-8.
- Brock, Roger; Hodkinson, Stephen (2000). Alternatives to Athens: Varieties of Political Organization and Community in Ancient Greece. Oxford, UK: Oxford University Press. ISBN 0-19-815220-5.
- Bryant, Joseph M. (1996). Moral Codes and Social Structure in Ancient Greece: A Sociology of Greek Ethics from Homer to the Epicureans and Stoics. Albany, NY: State University of New York Press. ISBN 0-7914-3042-1.
- Butler, Margaret Erwin (2008). Of Swords and Strigils: Social Change in Ancient Macedon. Stanford, CA: Stanford University.
- Cartledge, Paul (2011). Ancient Greece: A Very Short Introduction. Oxford: Oxford University Press. ISBN 978-0-19-960134-9.
- Cawkwell, George (1978). Philip of Macedon. London, UK: Faber & Faber. ISBN 0-571-10958-6.
- Chamoux, François (2002). Hellenistic Civilization. Oxford, UK: Blackwell Publishing. ISBN 0-631-22241-3.
- Champion, Craige B. (2004). Cultural Politics in Polybius's Histories. University of California Press. ISBN 0-520-23764-1.
- Christesen, Paul; Murray, Sarah C. (2010). "Macedonian Religion". In Roisman, Joseph; Worthington, Ian (eds.). A Companion to Ancient Macedonia. Oxford, Chichester, & Malden: Wiley-Blackwell. pp. 428–445. ISBN 978-1-4051-7936-2.
- Christidēs, Anastasios-Phoivos; Arapopoulou, Maria; Chritē, Maria (2007). A History of Ancient Greek: From the Beginnings to Late Antiquity. Cambridge, UK: Cambridge University Press. ISBN 978-0-521-83307-3.
- Chroust, Anton-Hermann (2016) [1977]. Aristotle: New Light on His Life and on Some of His Lost Works, Volume 1: Some Novel Interpretations of the Man and His Life. London & New York: Routledge. ISBN 978-1-138-93706-2.
- Cohen, Ada (2010). Art in the Era of Alexander the Great: Paradigms of Manhood and Their Cultural Traditions. Cambridge & New York: Cambridge University Press. ISBN 978-0-521-76904-4.
- Cook, Stanley Arthur; Adcock, Frank E.; Charlesworth, Martin Percival, eds. (1928). The Cambridge Ancient History: The Hellenistic Monarchies and the Rise of Rome. Vol. VII. Cambridge, UK: Cambridge University Press. ISBN 9780521233477.
- Dalby, Andrew (1997) [1996]. Siren Feasts: a History of Food and Gastronomy in Greece. London & New York: Routledge. ISBN 0-415-15657-2.
- Danforth, Loring M. (1997). The Macedonian Conflict: Ethnic Nationalism in a Transnational World. Princeton, NJ: Princeton University Press. ISBN 0-691-04356-6.
- Daskalakis, A. (1965). "The Hellenism of Ancient Macedonia". Hidryma Meletōn Chersonēsou Tou Haimou. 74. Thessaloniki: Institute for Balkan Studies.
- Eckstein, Arthur M. (2010). "Macedonia and Rome, 221–146 BC". In Roisman, Joseph; Worthington, Ian (eds.). A Companion to Ancient Macedonia. Oxford, Chichester, & Malden: Wiley-Blackwell. pp. 225–250. ISBN 978-1-4051-7936-2.
- Engels, Johannes (2010). "Macedonians and Greeks". In Roisman, Joseph; Worthington, Ian (eds.). A Companion to Ancient Macedonia. Oxford, Chichester, & Malden: Wiley-Blackwell. pp. 81–98. ISBN 978-1-4051-7936-2.
- Errington, Robert Malcolm (1990). A History of Macedonia. Berkeley and Los Angeles, CA: University of California Press. ISBN 0-520-06319-8.
- Fine, John Van Antwerp (1983). The Ancient Greeks: A Critical History. Cambridge, Massachusetts: Harvard University Press. ISBN 0-674-03314-0.
- Finkelberg, Margalit (2005). Greeks and Pre-Greeks: Aegean Prehistory and Greek Heroic Tradition. Cambridge, UK: Cambridge University Press. ISBN 0-521-85216-1.
- Fisher, Nicholas Ralph Edmund; Wees, Hans van, eds. (1998). Archaic Greece: New Approaches and New Evidence. London, UK: Duckworth. ISBN 0-7156-2809-7.
- Gagarin, Michael, ed. (2010). The Oxford Encyclopedia of Ancient Greece and Rome. Vol. 1. New York and Oxford: Oxford University Press. ISBN 978-0-19-517072-6.
- Garrett, Andrew (1999). "A New Model of Indo-European Subgrouping and Dispersal" (PDF). Annual Meeting of the Berkeley Linguistics Society. 25: 146–156. doi:10.3765/bls.v25i1.1180.
- Georgiev, Vladimir Ivanov (1981). Introduction to the History of the Indo-European Languages. Sofia, Bulgaria: Publishing House of the Bulgarian Academy of Sciences. ISBN 9789535172611.
- Graninger, Denver (2010). "Macedonia and Thessaly". In Roisman, Joseph; Worthington, Ian (eds.). A Companion to Ancient Macedonia. Oxford, Chichester, & Malden: Wiley-Blackwell. pp. 306–325. ISBN 978-1-4051-7936-2.
- Green, Peter (1991). Alexander of Macedon. University of California Press. ISBN 978-0-520-27586-7.
- Greenwalt, William S. (2010). "Macedonia, Illyria, and Epirus". In Roisman, Joseph; Worthington, Ian (eds.). A Companion to Ancient Macedonia. Oxford, Chichester, & Malden: Wiley-Blackwell. pp. 279–305. ISBN 978-1-4051-7936-2.
- Hall, Jonathan M. (2002). Hellenicity: Between Ethnicity and Culture. Chicago, Illinois and London, UK: The University of Chicago Press. ISBN 0-226-31329-8.
- Hall, Jonathan M. (2000). Ethnic Identity in Greek Antiquity. Cambridge, UK: Cambridge University Press. ISBN 0-521-78999-0.
- Hamilton, J. R. (1974) [1973]. Alexander the Great. Pittsburgh, Pennsylvania: University of Pittsburgh Press. ISBN 0-8229-6084-2.
- Hammond, Nicholas Geoffrey Lemprière (2001). Collected Studies: Further Studies on Various Topics. Amsterdam, the Netherlands: Hakkert.
- Hammond, Nicholas Geoffrey Lemprière (1993). Studies concerning Epirus and Macedonia before Alexander. Amsterdam, the Netherlands: Hakkert. ISBN 9789025610500.
- Hammond, Nicholas Geoffrey Lemprière (1991). The Miracle that was Macedonia. New York: St. Martin's Press. ISBN 0-283-99910-1.
- Hammond, Nicholas Geoffrey Lemprière (1989). The Macedonian State: Origins, Institutions, and History. Oxford, UK: Clarendon Press. ISBN 0-19-814883-6.
- Hammond, Nicholas Geoffrey Lemprière; Griffith, Guy Thompson (1979). A History of Macedonia: 550-336 B.C. Vol. II. Oxford, UK: Clarendon Press. ISBN 0-19-814814-3.
- Hammond, Nicholas Geoffrey Lemprière; Griffith, Guy Thompson (1972). A History of Macedonia: Historical Geography and Prehistory. Vol. I. Oxford, UK: Clarendon Press. ISBN 9780198142942.
- Hammond, Nicholas Geoffrey Lemprière; Walbank, Frank William (1988). A History of Macedonia: Volume III, 336-167 B.C. Oxford, UK: Oxford University Press. ISBN 0-19-814815-1.
- Hammond, Nicholas Geoffrey Lemprière; Walbank, Frank William (2001). A History of Macedonia: Volume III, 336–167 B.C. (reprint ed.). Oxford & New York: Clarendon Press of the Oxford University Press.
- Hanson, Victor Davis, ed. (2012). Makers of Ancient Strategy: From the Persian Wars to the Fall of Rome. Princeton, NJ: Princeton University Press. ISBN 978-0-691-15636-1.
- Hardiman, Craig I. (2010). "Classical Art to 221 BC". In Roisman, Joseph; Worthington, Ian (eds.). A Companion to Ancient Macedonia. Oxford, Chichester, & Malden: Wiley-Blackwell. pp. 505–521. ISBN 978-1-4051-7936-2.
- Harle, Vilho (1998). Ideas of Social Order in the Ancient World. Westport, CT: Greenwood Press. ISBN 978-0-313-30582-5.
- Hatzopoulos, M. B. (2011a). "Macedonia and Macedonians". In Lane Fox, Robin J. (ed.). Brill's Companion to Ancient Macedon: Studies in the Archaeology and History of Macedon, 650 BC – 300 AD. Leiden: Brill. pp. 43–50. ISBN 978-90-04-20650-2.
- Hatzopoulos, M. B. (2011b). "Macedonians and Other Greeks". In Lane Fox, Robin J. (ed.). Brill's Companion to Ancient Macedon: Studies in the Archaeology and History of Macedon, 650 BC – 300 AD. Leiden: Brill. pp. 51–78. ISBN 978-90-04-20650-2.
- Hatzopoulos, Miltiades (1999). "The Speech of the Ancient Macedonians, in the Light of Recent Epigraphic Discoveries". Proceedings of the Sixth International Symposion on Ancient Macedonia.
- Head, Duncan (2016) [1982]. Armies of the Macedonian and Punic Wars: 359 BC to 146 BC (reprint ed.). Wargames Research Group Ltd. ISBN 978-1-326-25656-2.
- Hidber, Thomas (2007). "Arrian". In de Jong, Irene J. F.; Nünlist, René (eds.). Time in Ancient Greek Literature (Studies in Ancient Greek Narrative, Volume 2). Brill. pp. 183–195. doi:10.1163/9789047422938_013. ISBN 978-90-474-2293-8.
- Horejs, Barbara (3 October 2007). "The Phenomenon of Mattpainted Pottery in the Northern Aegean: Introduction, Overview and Theories". Aegeo-Balkan Prehistory. Archived from the original on 3 September 2011.
- Hornblower, Simon; Matthews, Elaine; Fraser, Peter Marshall (2000). Greek Personal Names: Their Value as Evidence. Published for the British Academy by Oxford University Press. ISBN 0-19-726216-3.
- Hornblower, Simon. "2: Greek Identity in the Archaic and Classical Periods". In Zacharia (2008)..
- Isaac, Benjamin H. (2004). The Invention of Racism in Classical Antiquity. Princeton, NJ: Princeton University Press. ISBN 0-691-12598-8.
- Joint Association of Classical Teachers (1984). The World of Athens: An Introduction to Classical Athenian Culture. Cambridge, UK: Cambridge University Press. ISBN 0-521-27389-7.
- Jones, Archer (2001). The Art of War in the Western World. Champaign, Illinois: University of Illinois Press. ISBN 0-252-06966-8.
- Jones, Prudence J. (2006). Cleopatra: a sourcebook. Norman, OK: University of Oklahoma Press. ISBN 9780806137414.
- Iordanidis, A.; Garcia-Guinea, J.; Karamitrou-Mentessidi, Georgia (May 2007). "Characterisation of Mycenaean and Matt-Painted Pottery from Aiani, Ancient Upper Macedonia, Greece". Bulletin of the Geological Society of Greece. 40 (4). Athens, Greece: Proceedings of the 11th International Congress: 1796–1807. doi:10.12681/bgsg.17141.
- Karamitrou-Mentessidi, Georgia (16 March 2007). "The Late Bronze Age in Aiani". Aegeo-Balkan Prehistory. Archived from the original on 15 October 2007.
- King, Carol J. (2010). "Macedonian Kingship and Other Political Institutions". In Roisman, Joseph; Worthington, Ian (eds.). A Companion to Ancient Macedonia. Oxford, Chichester, & Malden: Wiley-Blackwell. pp. 373–391. ISBN 978-1-4051-7936-2.
- Kinzl, Konrad H. (2010). A Companion to the Classical Greek World. West Sussex, UK: John Wiley and Sons Limited. ISBN 978-1-4443-3412-8.
- Cosmopoulos, Michael B. (1992). Macedonia: An Introduction to Its Political History. Manitoba Studies in Classical Civilization. ISBN 978-0-9696691-0-4.
- Kristinsson, Axel (2010). Expansions: Competition and Conquest in Europe since the Bronze Age. Reykjavík, Iceland: ReykjavíkurAkademían. ISBN 978-9979-9922-1-9.
- Lemos, Irene S. (2002). The Protogeometric Aegean: The Archaeology of the Late Eleventh and Tenth Centuries BC. Oxford, UK: Oxford University Press. ISBN 0-19-925344-7.
- MacDowell, Douglas M. (2009). Demosthenes the Orator. New York: Oxford University Press. ISBN 978-0-19-160873-5.
- Malkin, Irad (1998). The Returns of Odysseus: Colonization and Ethnicity. Berkeley and Los Angeles, California: University of California Press. ISBN 978-0-520-21185-8.
- Malkin, Irad (2001). Ancient Perceptions of Greek Ethnicity. Center for Hellenic Studies, Trustees for Harvard University. ISBN 0-674-00662-3.
- Masson, Olivier; Dubois, Laurent (2000). Onomastica Graeca Selecta. Geneva, Switzerland: Librairie Droz. ISBN 2-600-00435-1.
- Masson, Olivier (1996). Oxford Classical Dictionary. Oxford, UK: Oxford University Press.
- Müller, Sabine (2010). "Philip II". In Roisman, Joseph; Worthington, Ian (eds.). A Companion to Ancient Macedonia. Oxford, Chichester, & Malden: Wiley-Blackwell. pp. 166–185. ISBN 978-1-4051-7936-2.
- Nawotka, Krzysztof (2010). Alexander the Great. Newcastle Upon Tyne: Cambridge Scholars Publishing. ISBN 978-1-4438-1743-1.
- O'Brien, John Maxwell (1994) [1992]. Alexander the Great: The Invisible Enemy - A Biography. New York, New York and London, UK: Routledge (Taylor & Francis). ISBN 0-415-10617-6.
- O'Neil, James L. (2003). "The Ethnic Origins of the Friends of the Antigonid Kings of Macedon". The Classical Quarterly. 10 (2): 510–522. doi:10.1093/cq/53.2.510. JSTOR 3556219.
- Olbrycht, Marck Jan (2010). "Macedonia and Persia". In Roisman, Joseph; Worthington, Ian (eds.). A Companion to Ancient Macedonia. Oxford, Chichester, & Malden: Wiley-Blackwell. pp. 342–370. ISBN 978-1-4051-7936-2.
- Osborne, Robin (2004). Greek History. New York, New York and London, UK: Routledge. ISBN 0-415-31717-7.
- Papazoglou, Fanoula (2000). "Le Language Macėdoniene Antique". Južnoslovenski Filolog. 56 (3–4): 771–777.
- Papazoglou, Fanoula (1977). "Sur le Structure Ethnique de l'Ancienne Macedonie". Balcanica (8): 65–82.
- Perlman, Samuel (1973). Philip and Athens. Cambridge, UK: Heffer. ISBN 0-85270-076-8.
- Perlman, Paula (2000). City and Sanctuary in Ancient Greece: The Theorodokia in the Peloponnese. Göttingen: Vandenhoeck & Ruprecht. ISBN 978-3525252185.
- Piening, H. (2013). "Mobile UV-VIS Absorption Spectrometry Investigations in the "Alexander-Sarcophagus" in Istanbul". In Büyüköztürk, Oral; Ali Taşdemir, Mehmet (eds.). Nondestructive Testing of Materials and Structures: Proceedings of NDTMS-2011, Istanbul Turkey, May 15–18 2011, Part 1. Heidelberg, New York, & London: RILEM & Springer. pp. 1179–1186. ISBN 978-94-007-0722-1.
- Prag, Johnathan R. W.; Quinn, Josephine Crawley (2013). "Introduction". In Prag, Johnathan R. W.; Quinn, Josephine Crawley (eds.). The Hellenistic West: Rethinking the Ancient Mediterranean. Cambridge & New York: Cambridge University Press. pp. 1–13. ISBN 978-1-107-03242-2.
- Rhodes, P. J. (2010). "The Literary and Epigraphic Evidence to the Roman Conquest". In Roisman, Joseph; Worthington, Ian (eds.). A Companion to Ancient Macedonia. Oxford, Chichester, & Malden: Wiley-Blackwell. pp. 23–40. ISBN 978-1-4051-7936-2.
- Roisman, Joseph (2010). "Classical Macedonia to Perdiccas III". In Roisman, Joseph; Worthington, Ian (eds.). A Companion to Ancient Macedonia. Oxford, Chichester, & Malden: Wiley-Blackwell. pp. 145–165. ISBN 978-1-4051-7936-2.
- Sakellariou, Michael B. (1983). "Inhabitants". In Michael B. Sakellariou (ed.). Macedonia: 4000 Years of Greek History and Civilization. Athens: Ekdotike Athenon S.A. pp. 44–63.
- Sakellariou, M. V. (1992). Macedonia, 4000 years of Greek History and Civilization. Athens, Greece: Ekdotikè Athenon.
- Sansone, David (2017). Ancient Greek Civilization (3rd ed.). Malden, Oxford, Chichester: Wiley-Blackwell. ISBN 978-1-119-09815-7.
- Sawada, Noriko (2010). "Social Customs and Institutions: Aspects of Macedonian Elite Society". In Roisman, Joseph; Worthington, Ian (eds.). A Companion to Ancient Macedonia. Oxford, Chichester, & Malden: Wiley-Blackwell. pp. 392–408. ISBN 978-1-4051-7936-2.
- Snodgrass, Anthony M. (2000). The Dark Age of Greece: An Archaeological Survey of the Eleventh to the Eighth Centuries BC. New York, New York: Routledge. ISBN 0-415-93635-7.
- Sprawski, Slawomir (2010). "The Early Temenid Kings to Alexander I". In Roisman, Joseph; Worthington, Ian (eds.). A Companion to Ancient Macedonia. Oxford, Chichester, & Malden: Wiley-Blackwell. pp. 127–144. ISBN 978-1-4051-7936-2.
- Starr, Chester G. (1991). A History of the Ancient World. New York, New York: Oxford University Press. ISBN 0-19-506628-6.
- Theodossiev, Nikola (May 2000). "The Dead with Golden Faces. II Other Evidence and Connections". Oxford Journal of Archaeology. 19 (2): 175–209. doi:10.1111/1468-0092.00106.
- Thomas, Carol G. (2010). "The Physical Kingdom". In Roisman, Joseph; Worthington, Ian (eds.). A Companion to Ancient Macedonia. Oxford, Chichester, & Malden: Wiley-Blackwell. pp. 65–80. ISBN 978-1-4051-7936-2.
- Toynbee, Arnold Joseph (1969). Some Problems of Greek History. Oxford, UK: Oxford University Press. ISBN 978-0-19-215249-7.
- Toynbee, Arnold Joseph (1981). The Greeks and Their Heritages. Oxford, UK: Oxford University Press. ISBN 9780192152565.
- Trudgill, Peter (2002). Sociolinguistic Variation and Change. Edinburgh, UK: Edinburgh University Press. ISBN 0-7486-1515-6.
- Vanderpool, Eugene (1982). Studies in Attic Epigraphy, History, and Topography. Princeton, NJ: American School of Classical Studies at Athens. ISBN 0-87661-519-1.
- Voutiras, Emmanuel (1998). ΔΙΟΝΥΣΟΦΩΝΤΟΣ ΓΑΜΟΙ: Marital Life and Magic in Fourth Century Pella. Amsterdam, the Netherlands: J. C. Gieben. ISBN 90-5063-407-9.
- Whitley, James (2007). The Archaeology of Ancient Greece. Cambridge, UK: Cambridge University Press. ISBN 978-0-521-62733-7.
- Wilkes, John J. (1995). The Illyrians. Oxford, UK: Blackwell Publishing. ISBN 0-631-19807-5.
- Woodard, Roger D. (2008a). The Ancient Languages of Asia Minor. Cambridge, UK: Cambridge University Press. ISBN 978-0-521-68496-5.
- Woodard, Roger D. (2010) [2008]. "Language in Ancient Europe: an Introduction". In Woodard, Roger D. (ed.). The Ancient Languages of Europe. Cambridge: Cambridge University Press. pp. 1–13. ISBN 978-0-521-68495-8.
- Woodard, Roger D. (2008b). The Ancient Languages of Europe. Cambridge, UK: Cambridge University Press. ISBN 978-0-521-68495-8.
- Worthington, Ian (2014a) [2004]. Alexander the Great: Man and God. New York, NY: Routledge. ISBN 978-1-317-86644-2.
- Worthington, Ian (2003). Alexander the Great: A Reader. London, UK: Routledge. ISBN 978-0-415-29187-3.
- Worthington, Ian (2008). Philip II of Macedonia. New Haven, Connecticut: Yale University Press. ISBN 978-0-300-12079-0.
- Worthington, Ian (2012). Alexander the Great: a Reader (2nd ed.). London & New York: Routledge. ISBN 978-0-415-66742-5.
- Worthington, Ian (2014b). By the Spear: Philip II, Alexander the Great, and the Rise and Fall of the Macedonian Empire. Oxford and New York: Oxford University Press. ISBN 978-0-19-992986-3.
- Zacharia, Katerina (2008). Hellenisms: Culture, Identity, and Ethnicity from Antiquity to Modernity. Hampshire, England: Ashgate Publishing. ISBN 978-0-7546-6525-0.
