= Argead dynasty =

First dynasty of the Macedonian Kingdom

Argeads Ἀργεάδαι
- Royal house
- Vergina Sun
- Parent house: Temenids (Heracleidae)
- Country: Macedonia (Ancient Greece)
- Founded: 7th century BC
- Final ruler: Alexander IV of Macedon
- Titles: Basileus of Macedonia, King of Persia, King of Asia, Pharaoh of Egypt (Thirty-second Dynasty of Egypt), Hegemon of the Hellenic League, Strategos Autokrator of Greece
- Estate: Macedon
- Dissolution: 311/304 BC (Note: There is confusion regarding Alexander IV's death year. It was long believed he was killed c. 310 BC, however, he continued to be recognized as the sovereign is some parts of the Empire until 304 BC, which may suggest he lived until that year or was posthumously treated as reigning monarch in the absence of a direct heir.)
- Cadet branches: Ptolemaic dynasty (possibly)

The Argead dynasty (Greek: Ἀργεάδαι, romanized: Argeádai), also known as the Temenid dynasty (Greek: Τημενίδαι, Tēmenídai) was an ancient Macedonian royal house of Dorian Greek provenance. They were the founders and the ruling dynasty of the ancient kingdom of Macedon from about 700 to c. 310 BC or to 304 BC.

Their tradition, as described in Greek historiography, traced their origins to Argos, in the Peloponnese region of Southern Greece. They were known as Argeads or Argives. Initially, the Argeadae were the rulers of the tribe of the same name, (Argead Macedonians) who prevailed in early Emathia, later Lower Macedonia, with their capital at Aigai. By the time of Philip II of Macedon, they had expanded their reign further, to include under the rule of Macedonia, now governed from Pella, all the Upper Macedonian states. The family's most celebrated members were Philip II of Macedon and his son Alexander the Great, under whose leadership the kingdom of Macedonia gradually gained predominance throughout Greece, established the Hellenic League, defeated the Achaemenid Empire and expanded as far as Egypt and India. The mythical founder of the Argead dynasty is King Caranus. The Argeads claimed descent from Heracles through his great-great-grandson Temenus, also king of Argos.

== Origin ==
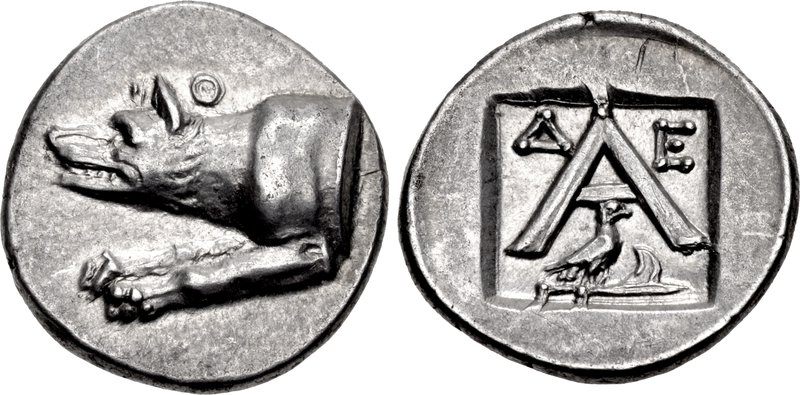
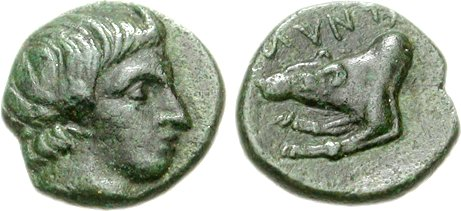
Triobol of Argos (top), and a bronze coin of King Amyntas II of Macedon (bottom). The early Argead kings often copied the wolf of Argos' coins on their own coinage to highlight their supposed ancestry from this city.

The words Argead and Argive derive (via Latin Argīvus) from the Greek Ἀργεῖος (Argeios meaning "of or from Argos"), which is first attested to in Homer where it was also used as a collective designation for the Greeks ("Ἀργείων Δαναῶν", Argive Danaans). The Argead dynasty claimed descent from the Temenids of Argos, in the Peloponnese, whose legendary ancestor was Temenus, the great-great-grandson of Heracles.

In the excavations of the royal Palace of Aigai, near modern Vergina in Greek Macedonia, Manolis Andronikos discovered in the "tholos" room (according to some scholars "tholos" was the throne room) a Greek inscription relating to that belief. This is testified by Herodotus, in The Histories, where he mentions that three brothers of the lineage of Temenus, Gauanes, Aeropus and Perdiccas, fled from Argos to the Illyrians and then to Upper Macedonia, to a town called Lebaea, where they served the king. The latter asked them to leave his territory, believing in an omen that something great would happen to Perdiccas. The boys went near the garden of Midas, above which mount Bermio stands. There they made their abode and slowly formed their own kingdom.

Herodotus also relates the incident of the participation of Alexander I of Macedon in the Olympic Games in 504 or 500 BC where the participation of the Macedonian king was contested by participants on the grounds that he was not Greek. The Hellanodikai, however, after examining his Argead claim confirmed that the Macedonian kings were Greeks and allowed him to participate. According to the Greek scholar M. Sakellariou, the common name of Temenids between the Macedonian dynasty and the Doric dynasty of Argos had its origin to the relation between the tribe of Makednoi, that later became the Makedones, and the Dorians.

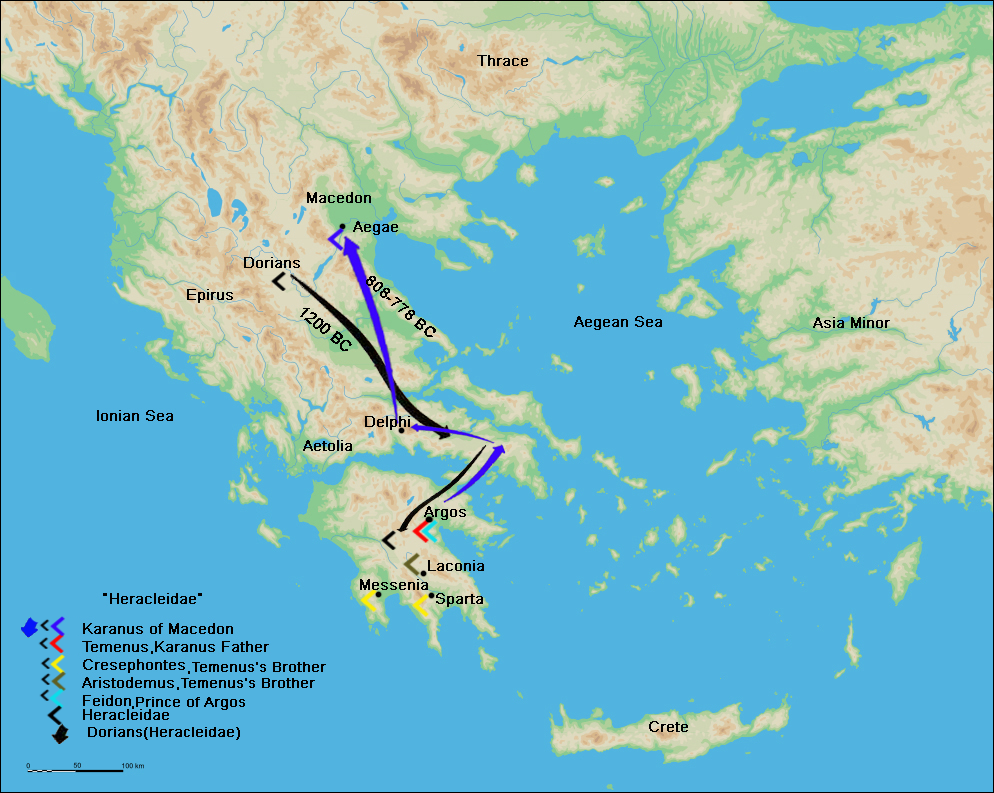
The route of the Argeads from Argos, Peloponnese, to Macedonia according to Herodotus

Thucydides, in the History of the Peloponnesian War, the Argeads were originally Temenids from Argos, who descended from the highlands to Lower Macedonia, expelled the Pierians from Pieria and acquired in Paionia a narrow strip along the river Axios extending to Pella and the sea. They also added Mygdonia in their territory through the expulsion of the Edoni, Eordians, and Almopians.

Another theory supported by the Greek historian Miltiades Hatzopoulos, following the opinion of the ancient author Appian, is that the Argead dynasty actually came from Argos Orestikon.

House of Argos

Miltiades Hatzopoulos has suggested that the Ancient Macedonian dialect of the 4th century BC, as attested in the Pella curse tablet, was a sort of Macedonian 'koine' resulting from the encounter of the idiom of the 'Aeolic'-speaking populations around Mount Olympus and the Pierian Mountains with the Northwest Greek-speaking Argead Makedones hailing from Argos Orestikon, who founded the kingdom of Lower Macedonia. However, according to Hatzopoulos, B. Helly expanded and improved his own earlier suggestion and presented the hypothesis of a (North-)'Achaean' substratum extending as far north as the head of the Thermaic Gulf, which had a continuous relation, in prehistoric times both in Thessaly and Macedonia, with the Northwest Greek-speaking populations living on the other side of the Pindus mountain range, and contacts became cohabitation when the Argead Makedones completed their wandering from Orestis to Lower Macedonia in the 7th c. BC. According to this hypothesis, Hatzopoulos concludes that the Ancient Macedonian Greek dialect of the historical period, which is attested in inscriptions, is a sort of koine resulting from the interaction and the influences of various elements, the most important of which are the North-Achaean substratum, the Northwest Greek dialect of the Argead Macedonians, and the Thracian and Phrygian adstrata. Borza has argued that "the 'highlanders' or Makedones of the mountainous regions of western Macedonia may have been derived from northwest Greek stock", and that "those who emerged into the lowlands were to be distinguished from the rest of the Makedones who remained in the mountain cantons by the name Argeadae".

== History ==
=== Succession disputes ===
The death of the king almost invariably triggered dynastic disputes and often a war of succession between members of the Argead family, leading to political and economic instability. These included:

- Six-year Macedonian interregnum (399–393 BCE), after the death of king Archelaus, between Orestes, Aeropus II, Amyntas II and Pausanias
- Macedonian war of succession (393–392 BCE), after the death of king Pausanias, between Amyntas III and Argaeus II
- Macedonian war of succession (369–368 BCE), after the death of king Amyntas III, between Ptolemy of Aloros and Alexander II of Macedon
- Macedonian war of succession (360–359 BCE), after the death of king Perdiccas III, between Philip II (who deposed Amyntas IV), Argeus (supported by Athens), Pausanias (supported by Thrace) and Archelaus (supported by the Chalcidian League)
- Wars of the Diadochi (323–277 BCE), after the death of king Alexander the Great, between his Diadochi ("Successors")

Additionally, long-established monarchs could still face a rebellion by a relative when the former's kingship was perceived to be weak. An example was Philip's rebellion against his older brother, king Perdiccas II, in the prelude to the Peloponnesian War (433–431 BCE).

=== List of rulers ===
Argead Rulers
Image	Reign	Monarch Name	Comments
	c. 808-778 BC	Karanos	Founder of the Argead dynasty and the first king of Macedon. Possibly fictional.
	c. 778-750 BC	Koinos	Possibly fictional.
	c. 750-700 BC	Tyrimmas	Possibly fictional.
	c. 700-678 BC	Perdiccas I	
	c. 678-640 BC	Argaeus I	
	c. 640-602 BC	Philip I	
	c. 602-576 BC	Aeropus I	
	576-547 BC	Alcetas	
	547-498 BC	Amyntas I	Vassal of the Achaemenid Empire in 512/511 BC. Historians recognize Amyntas as the first Macedonian monarch of historical importance.
	497-454 BC	Alexander I	Fully subordinate part of the Achaemenid Empire after 492 BC, then full Independence after 479 BC following the withdrawal of the Achaemenid army.
	454-413 BC	Perdiccas II	
	413-399 BC	Archelaus	
	399-396 BC	Orestes	Ruled jointly with Aeropus II, until he was murdered by Aeropus II
	399-394/393 BC	Aeropus II	Joint rule with Orestes until 396 BC, then sole rule
	393 BC	Amyntas II	Very brief reign ended with his assassination by an Elimieotan nobleman named Derdas
	393 BC	Pausanias	Assassinated by, Amyntas III in the year of his accession
	393 BC	Amyntas III (First Reign)	
	393-392 BC	Argaeus II	Usurped throne from Amyntas III for about a year with the aid of the Illyrians
	392-370 BC	Amyntas III (Second Reign)	Restored to the throne after around one year
	370-368 BC	Alexander II	Assassinated by his maternal uncle Ptolemy of Aloros
	368-359 BC	Perdiccas III	Ptolemy of Aloros was his regent from 368-365 BC, until he was murdered by Perdiccas III
	359 BC	Amyntas IV	Young son of Perdiccas III, throne usurped by Philip II
	359-336 BC	Philip II	Expanded Macedonian territory and influence to achieve a dominant position in the Balkans, confederated most of the Greek city-states in the League of Corinth under his hegemony.
	336-323 BC	Alexander III the Great	The most notable Macedonian king and one of the most celebrated kings and military strategists of all time. By the end of his reign, Alexander was simultaneously King of Macedonia, Pharaoh of Egypt and King of Persia, and had conquered the entire former Achaemenid Empire as well as parts of the western Indus Valley.
	323-317 BC	Philip III Arrhidaeus	Half-brother of Alexander the Great. Titular figurehead king of the Macedonian Empire, during the early Wars of the Diadochi, alongside his half-nephew Alexander IV of Macedon; was mentally disabled to at least some degree. Executed by Olympias.
	323–311/304 BC	Alexander IV	Son of Alexander the Great and Roxana of Bactria, who was yet unborn at the time of his father's death. The nominal king of the Macedonian Empire since birth as co-regent of his half-uncle Philip III, became sole king in 317 BC. Executed by Cassander.

== Family tree ==
Modern historians disagree on a number of details concerning the genealogy of the Argead dynasty. Robin Lane Fox, for example, refutes Nicholas Hammond's claim that Ptolemy of Aloros was Amyntas II's son, arguing that Ptolemy was neither his son nor an Argead. Consequently, the charts below do not account for every chronological, genealogical, and dynastic complexity. Instead, they represent one common reconstruction of the Argeads advanced by historians such as Hammond, Elizabeth Carney, and Joseph Roisman.

Simplified Family Tree

Perdiccas I r. c. 650 BC
Argaeus I r. c. 623 BC
Philip I r. c. 593 BC
Aeropus I r. c. 563 BC
Alcetas r. c. 533 BC
Amyntas I r. ? – 497 BC
Alexander I r. 497 – 454 BC
Perdiccas II r. 454 – 413 BC	Menelaus	Amyntas
Archelaus r. 413 – 399 BC	Aeropus II r. 397 – 394 BC	Argaeus II r. 388 – 387 BC	Amyntas II r. 394	Arrhidaeus
Orestes r. 399 – 397 BC	Pausanias r. 394	Ptolemy of Aloros r. 368 – 365 BC	Amyntas III r. 393 – 370 BC
Alexander II r. 370 – 368 BC	Perdiccas III r. 365 – 359 BC	Philip II r. 359 – 336 BC
Amyntas IV r. 359	Philip III Arrhidaeus r. 323 – 317 BC	Alexander the Great r. 336 – 323 BC
Alexander IV r. 323 – 311/304 BC

Detailed Family Tree
Individuals with disputed heritage or rule are italicized.

Perdiccas I c. 650 BC
Argaeus I c. 623
Philip I c. 593
Aeropus I c. 563
Alcetas c. 533
Amyntas I 512–498/7
Alexander I 498/7–454	Gygaea ∞ Bubares
Symache; Cleopatra	Perdiccas II; 454–413	Menelaus	Amyntas	Philip	Alcetas	Stratonice ∞ Seuthes II	Amyntas
Archelaus; 413–399	Aeropus II; 398/7–395/4	Amyntas II; 394/3	Arrhidaeus	sons	sons
unnamed son	Orestes; 399–398/7	Argaeus II; 393 BC?	Pausanias; 394/3	Ptolemy; 368–365	Amyntas III; 393–369	1. Eurydice I 2. Gygaea
Alexander II; 369–368	Perdiccas III; 365–360/59	Eurynoe	1. Audata; 2. Phila of Elimeia; 3. Nicesipolis; 4. Philinna	Philip II; 360/59–336	5. Olympias; 6. Meda of Odessos; 7. Cleopatra Eurydice	Menelaus; Archelaus; Arrhidaeus
Amyntas IV; 359	Cynane	Thessalonike ∞Cassander	Philip III; 323–317	Alexander III; 336–323	1. Roxana; 2. Stateira II/Barsine; 3. Parysatis II	Caranus	Europa
Eurydice II	Alexander IV; 323–311/304 BC
