= Philippeion =

Circular monument at Ancient Olympia, Greece

- Φιλίππειον
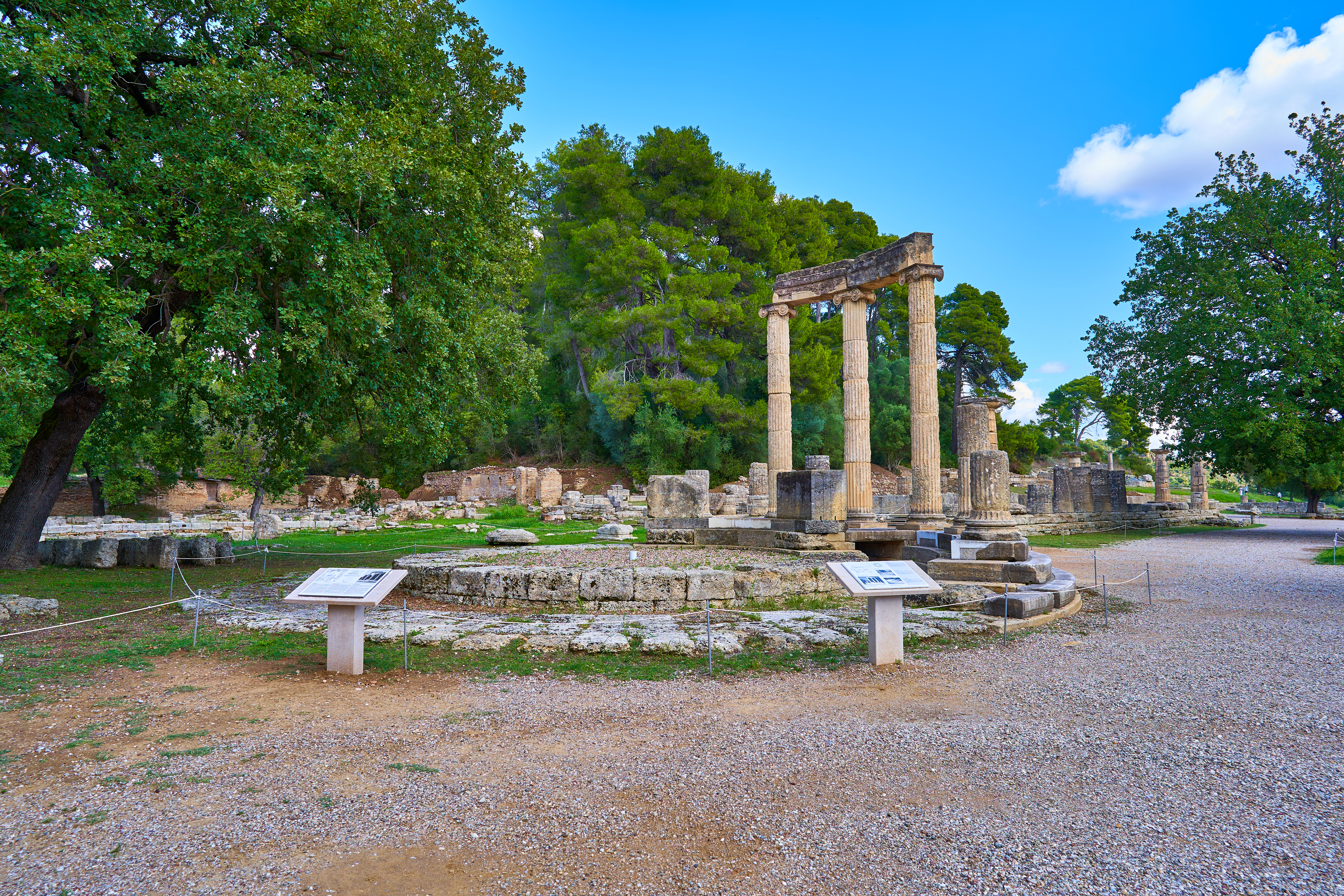
- The ruins of the Philippeion in 2020
- Interactive map of the Philippeion area

General information
- Type: Tholos
- Architectural style: Ancient Greek architecture
- Location: Olympia, Greece
- Coordinates: 37°38′19″N 21°37′46″E
- Construction started: c. 338 BCE
- Completed: c. 336 BCE

Design and construction
- Architect: Leochares

The Philippeion (Greek: Φιλιππεῖον) in the Altis of Olympia was a tholos made of in limestone and marble. Originally, it contained chryselephantine (ivory and gold) statues of the family of Philip II, including himself, his son Alexander the Great, one of his wives Olympias, his father Amyntas III, and his mother Eurydice I. It was made by the Athenian sculptor Leochares as a memorial celebrating Philip's victory at the battle of Chaeronea (338 BC). It was the only structure inside the Altis dedicated to human beings rather than gods.

== Description ==
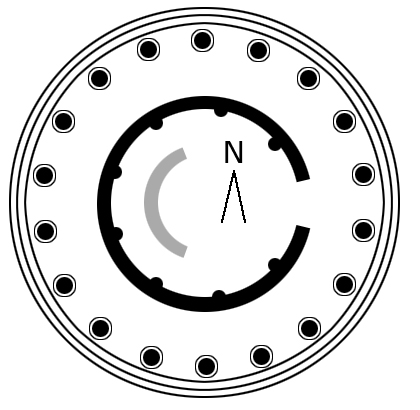
Floor plan

The temple consisted of an outer colonnade of Ionic order with 18 columns. Inside it had nine engaged columns of the lavishly designed Corinthian order. It had a diameter of 15 metres. The naos contained two windows, much like Hera II at Paestum. The roof was covered with marble tiles and crowned with a bronze poppy.

The structure degraded in the millennia since its construction, with none of the statues surviving, and only part of the structure still standing today. The current condition of the site reflects partial restoration work that took place from 2004 to 2005, following the return of several architectural components which had previously been on display in the Berlin acheological museum.

Construction began under Philip's rule, but was completed under Alexander the Great following Philip's death in 336 BC. It was Alexander who commissioned the chryselephantine statues, which were the only statues depicting humans at the site and used the same material as the adjacent statue of Zeus at Olympia. This was intended to encourage deification of Macedonian royal family through a comparison to the gods of the Greek pantheon, and the site was used for worship of the family.
