= Archelaus (son of Amyntas III) =

4th-century BC Macedonian

- Born: ?
- Died: 359 BC
- House: Argaed
- Father: Amyntas III
- Mother: Gygaea

Archelaus (Ancient Greek: Ἀρχέλαος, romanized: Archélaos; died 359 BC) was the half-brother of Philip II, king of ancient Macedonia. He was the son of Amyntas III and his second wife, Gygaea. Philip executed Archelaus shortly after he became king in 359 BC, possibly due to the military threat posed by the pretender Argaeus and the need to secure the throne from additional potential rivals. He also likely executed Gygaea's other sons, Menelaus and Arrhidaeus, following a siege at Olynthus ten years later in 348 BC.

== See also ==
- List of ancient Macedonians
