= Eurydice I of Macedon =

Queen of Macedon from 393 to 369 BC

Eurydice I

Queen of Macedon
- Tenure: 393–369 BC
- Born: ca. 410–407 BC
- Burial: Vergina, Macedon, Ancient Greece
- Spouse: Amyntas III of Macedon
- Issue: Alexander II; Perdiccas III; Philip II; Eurynoe
- House: Argead; Bacchiad (by descent)
- Father: Sirras
- Mother: Irra, daughter of Arrhabaeus
- Religion: Ancient Greek religion

Eurydice (Greek: Εὐρυδίκη – from ευρύς eurys, "wide" and δίκη dike, "right, custom, usage, law; justice", literally "wide justice") was an Ancient Macedonian queen and wife of king Amyntas III of Macedon.

She was the daughter of Sirras and through her mother, Irra, she was the grand-daughter of the Lynkestian king Arrhabaeus, member of the Doric Greek Bacchiadae family. Eurydice had four children: Alexander II, Perdiccas III, Philip II, all of whom would be crowned kings, a daughter Eurynoe, and through her son Philip, she was the paternal grandmother of Alexander the Great. Literary, inscriptional and archaeological evidence indicates that she played an important public role in Macedonian life and acted aggressively in the political arena.

Eurydice's political activities mark a turning point in Macedonian history. She is the first known royal woman who actively took political action and successfully exerted political influence.

== Early life ==
Eurydice was born at approximately 410–407 BC. Her father was the noble Sirras, who was either an Illyrian chieftain or a prince-regent of Lynkestis under king Arrhabaeus. Sirras' origin is disputed, mainly between an Illyrian and a Lynkestian descent, not mutually exclusive. Her mother was the daughter of the Lynkestian king Arrhabaeus, who claimed membership to the Doric Greek Bacchiadae family.

== Queen of Macedon ==
King Amyntas III of Macedon married the young princess Eurydice in about 390 BC, probably in a Macedonian effort to strengthen the alliance with both the Illyrians and Lynkestians, or to detach the Lynkestians from their historical alliance with the Illyrians, after he was defeated by Illyrians or an Illyrian-Lynkestian coalition in 393 BC. Ten years later king Amyntas III was forced to entrust a portion of his kingdom to the Greek Chalcidians, who refused to relinquish it, and by 382 BC had extended their control westward, including Macedon’s capital Pella. Sparta, the most powerful of the Greek states at that time, intervened and restored Amyntas to his capital in 379 BC, but Macedonia had to accept subservience to Sparta.

Amyntas had another wife, a fellow kinswoman named Gygaea, who had three children. At some point during her husband's reign, Eurydice became the dominant wife. Still it cannot be determined whether this development was immediate or gradual, linked with her family and relations, her higher status, the ages of her sons or a combination of these factors. Nevertheless, for the first time events in the life of a royal woman were also central to the political arena of Macedonia in that period and Eurydice was, however, the most important factor in the change.

Eurydice was literate, although she learned to read rather late in life, probably due to being part of a culture that still was heavily oral in nature and where literacy was not fundamental to knowledge, even more in the case of those who had the wealth and leisure to be read to.

== Career ==
Her life career is full of controversy. According to the Roman historian Justin, Eurydice conspired with her son-in-law Ptolemy of Aloros to kill Amyntas, then marry Ptolemy, and then give the throne to her lover. But the queen's daughter, Eurynoe, foiled the plot by revealing it to her father, Amyntas, who, nevertheless, spared Eurydice from punishment because of their common children. Eventually in 370/369 BC, Amyntas III died, and his eldest son, Alexander II succeeded him. In 368 BC, Ptolemy of Aloros killed Alexander II, despite an earlier settlement between them, worked out by Pelopidas, a Theban statesman and general. Then Ptolemy was forced by Pelopidas to agree merely to be regent for Alexander's two younger brothers, Perdiccas III and Philip II.

Later on Eurydice married Ptolemy. It is unlikely that Eurydice voluntarily married her eldest son's murderer, most probably she acted to ensure the succession of her remaining sons. A new pretender of the throne, Pausanias was very popular and was attracting support in Macedonia. Queen Eurydice asked the Athenian general Iphicrates (their father's adoptive son) to protect the throne for her two sons. Iphicrates drove out Pausanias. There is no evidence that Ptolemy had any role in this matter, or suggests that anyone other than Eurydice would have influenced Iphicrates. Even if she was prompted by Ptolemy, her successful intervention in political and military affairs remains remarkably bold and without any known precedent, an extraordinary act for a royal woman. Eurydice took the unprecedented step of seeking international help when she believed the succession of her remaining sons was in jeopardy and her attempt was successful.

In 365 BC Perdiccas III avenged his brother's murder by murdering Ptolemy and taking the throne. This caused a stir amongst the families of Macedon, which called in Pelopidas to re-establish peace. As part of the peace settlement, Philip II was taken as a hostage to Thebes. Perdiccas reigned until 359 BC, and already weakened by struggles against Athens, he confronted the Illyrian ruler Bardylis and died along with 4000 of his men in a disastrous battle. Eventually his youngest brother Philip II took control of the kingdom.

== Personal life ==
Eurydice was also very active in the cult activities. She may have funded the construction of the temple of Eucleia cult at Vergina. She had made a dedication polietisi (πολιετισι) to or for women citizens, and perhaps to the Muses, grateful for her acquired education.

== Archaeological findings ==
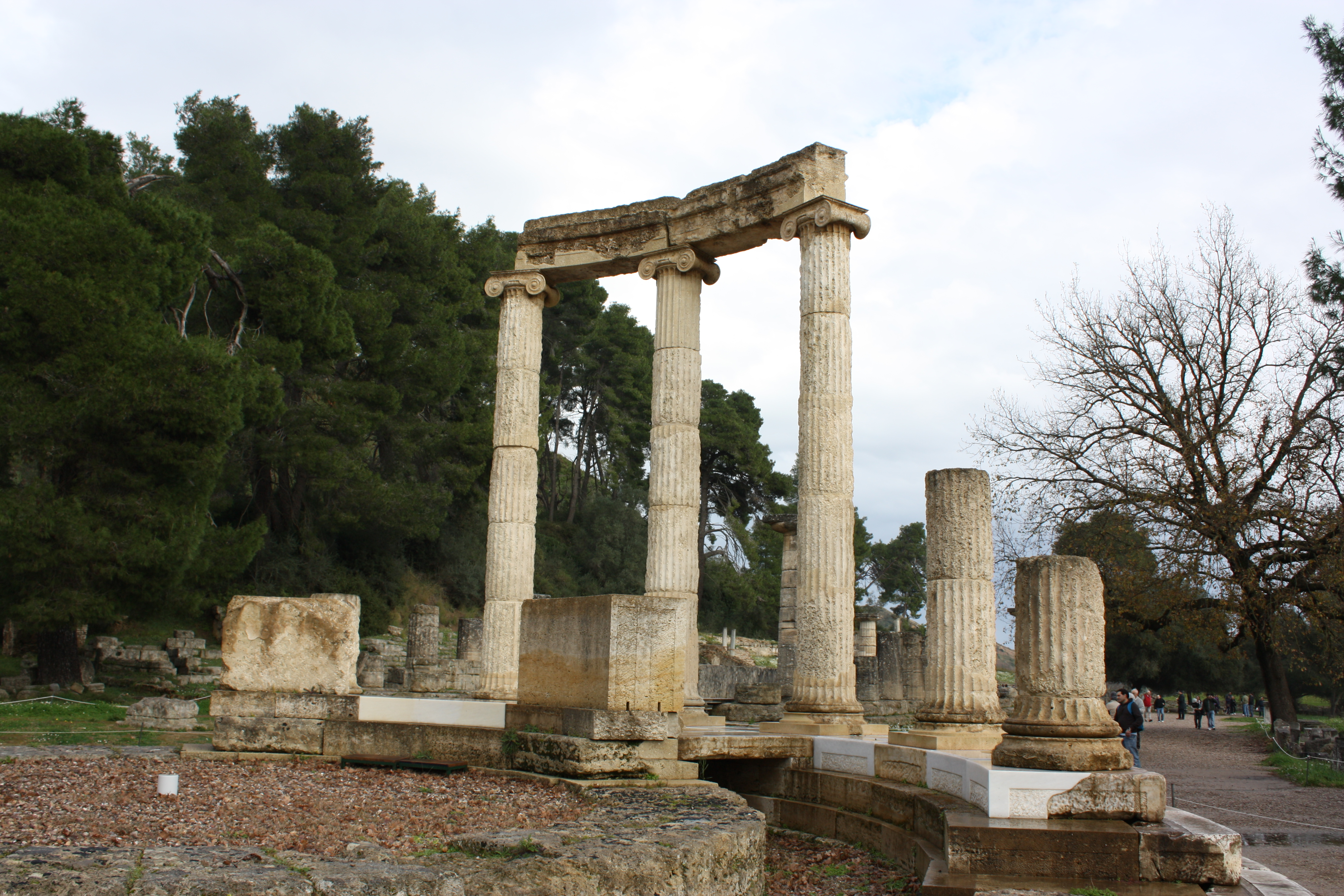
The Philippeion at Olympia, Greece, where once the statues of Eurydice I and her family were placed

Eurydice's portrait-statue, together with those of her most celebrated son Philip II, Philip II's wife, Olympias, her grandson, Alexander the Great, and her husband, Amyntas III, were realized by the Athenian statuary and sculptor Leochares in ivory and gold. They were placed in the Philippeion, a circular building in the Altis at Olympia, erected by Philip II of Macedon in celebration of his victory at the Battle of Chaeronea (338 BC).

Eurydice's tomb was found and identified by the Greek archaeologist Manolis Andronikos in 1987 in Vergina (ancient Aigai), a UNESCO World Heritage Site, along with other royal Macedonian tombs. In the summer of 2001, between August 13 and September 9 the tomb of Eurydice was robbed and seven marble figurines had been taken. Eurydice's tomb had faced robbery and was partially plundered since antiquity, probably soon after queen's burial, but the looters had probably failed in their mission, as evidenced by two skeletons found there. An inscribed pot fragment, dating 344/3 BC was found inside the tomb, whereas two inscriptions, one of which dated in 340 BC, have been found in Vergina of Eurydika daughter of Sirras to goddess Eukleia.

== Ancestry and plot disputes ==
In order to defend Eurydices' son Philip II from ancient allegation that Macedonians were non-Greeks, Aeschines had publicly described Phillip as being "entirely Greek". Both Demosthenes and Attalus implied that Phillip was a pure-blooded Macedonian, with no mention of any supposed non-Macedonian ancestry. Strabo claims that, through her mother, Eurydice descended from a branch of the Doric Greek Bacchiadae clan, originally of Corinth, which historically established itself as the ruling dynasty of Lynkestis in the 5th century BC. The Bacchiad claim of her Lynkestian maternal grandfather Arrhabaeus, king of Lynkestis, is generally accepted by modern historians. Plutarch explicitly states that Eurydice was an Illyrian, so does Libanius and thus is stated in the massive 10th century Byzantine encyclopaedia, Suda. Some modern historians see this characterization as "slander", arguing that it originated from Athens, which sought to discredit her son, Philip, by defaming him as having non-Greek ancestry. Other modern historians regard this characterization as historically accurate, arguing that the alliance between her grandfather Arrhabaeus and the Illyrians was well known, and given the propensity of the elite class to secure political alliances through royal intermarriages, it seems quite probable that the Lynkestian king's granddaughter was also partly Illyrian. Some, in particular, consider that Eurydice's father Sirras was Illyrian, though others argue that he was Lynkestian.

As for Sirras, among modern scholars and historians, Robert Malcolm Errington, N. G. L. Hammond, and Charles F. Edson support a Lynkestian ancestry, while Eugene N. Borza, A. B. Bosworth and Kate Mortensen, support an Illyrian ancestry. In an inductive analysis of the historical information over Sirras, through an a posteriori argument, Elias Kapetanopoulos says that Sirras must have been a Lynkestian – and thus Eurydice as well – though he also hypothesizes a native Macedonian or Orestian origin. Ian Worthington also makes a case for her Lynkestian ancestry by stating the following argument concerning the Illyrian hypothesis: "However, this is unlikely in light of a comment that Attalus made at the wedding of Philip in 337, intended as a slur on Alexander's legitimacy, for his mother (Olympias) was from Epirus. Attalus presumably would not have wanted to draw attention to Philip's illegitimacy if his mother were non-Macedonian", and also writes that, "Attalus' taunt, incidentally, goes some way to determining whether Philip's mother, Eurydice, was Lyncestian or Illyrian. If she had been the latter, then Attalus' remark would, by implication, make Philip also illegitimate. ... Hence Philip's mother was probably Lyncestian." Sophia Kremydi asserts that any theory for Eurydice's alleged Illyrian ancestry should be abandoned.

Stories of Eurydice's plots against her husband and her sons are at odds with other historical evidence and may be fabricated. Recent scholars have noted the many implausibilities in Justin’s narrative and have acknowledged Eurydice's near-contemporary evidences of Aeschines towards her. Aeschines described Eurydice I as the loyal defender of her sons, whereas a Plutarch's passage describes Eurydice as a good model in the education of children.

== See also ==
- Ancient Macedonia
- List of kings of Macedon
- Lynkestis
