= Alexander II of Macedon =

King of Macedonia from 370 to 368 BC

Alexander II
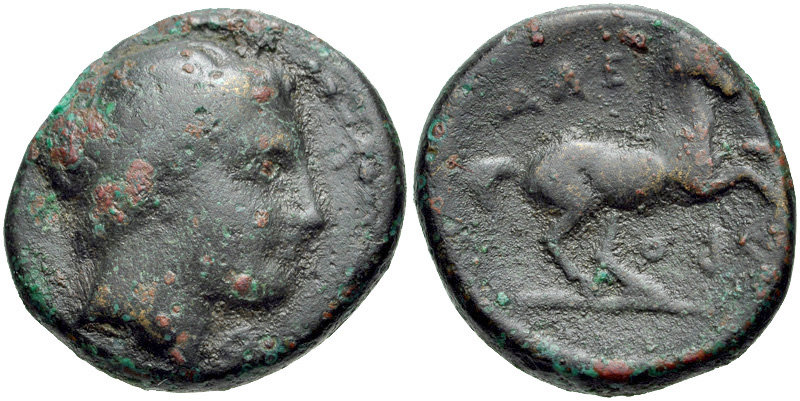
- Bronze drachma of Alexander II

King of Macedonia
- Reign: 370–368 BC
- Predecessor: Amyntas III
- Successor: Perdiccas III
- Born: c. 390 BC
- Died: 368 BC (aged approx. 22)
- House: Argead dynasty
- Father: Amyntas III
- Mother: Eurydice I

Alexander II (Ancient Greek: Ἀλέξανδρος, romanized: Alexandros; c. 390–368 BC) was king of the ancient Greek kingdom of Macedon from around 370 BC until his death in 368 BC. He was a member of the Argead dynasty through his father Amyntas III.

== Family ==
He was the eldest of the three sons of king Amyntas and Queen Eurydice I. His brothers were Philip and Perdiccas III.

== King of Macedonia ==
Although he had already attained his majority, Alexander was very young when he ascended to the throne in 369 BC. This caused immediate problems for the new king as enemies of the dynasty resumed war. Alexander simultaneously faced an Illyrian invasion from the north-west and an attack from the east by the pretender Pausanias. Pausanias quickly captured several cities and threatened the queen mother, who was at the palace in Pella with her young sons. Alexander defeated his enemies with the help of the Athenian general Iphicrates, who had been sailing along the Macedonian coast on the way to recapture Amphipolis.

At the request of the Thessalian Aleuadae, Alexander intervened in a civil war in Thessaly. He successfully gained control of Larissa and several other cities but, betraying a promise he had made, put garrisons in them. This provoked a hostile reaction from Thebes, the leading military power in Greece at the time. The Theban general Pelopidas drove the Macedonians from Thessaly. He then neutralized Alexander by favoring the ambitions of Alexander's brother-in-law Ptolemy of Aloros, and forced Alexander to abandon his alliance with Athens in favor of Thebes. As part of this new alliance, Alexander had to hand over hostages, including his younger brother Philip.

He would coin the name of the king's personal guard; the Pezhetairos, or the infantry companions. The name would be retooled under Philip II as the name of his pike infantry.

Alexander was assassinated during a performance of the telesias, a war dance, at the instigation of Ptolemy. Although Alexander's brother Perdiccas III became the next king, he was under age, and Ptolemy became regent and effectively the ruler.

Alexander II of Macedon Argead dynasty Born: c. 390 BC Died: 368 BC
| Preceded by Amyntas III | King of Macedon; 370–368 BC | Succeeded by Ptolemy of Aloros |
