= Menelaus of Macedon =

Menelaus of Macedon (/ˌmɛnɪˈleɪəs/; Ancient Greek: Μενέλαος, Menelaos) may refer to:

- Menelaus, father of Amyntas II or Amyntas III king and grandfather of Philip, according to Justin (vii. 4) and Aelian ( V. H. xii. 43). But there is much discrepancy on this point: Dexippus (ap. Syncell. p. 263, a.) calls the father of Amyntas III as Arrhidaeus; and Diodorus (xv. 60), Tharraleos. Justin represents him as brother of Alexander I which seems a gross error. (See Clinton, F. ff, vol. ii. p. 225.)
- Menelaus (son of Amyntas III) by his second wife. He was put to death by his stepbrother Philip II in 347 BC
- Menelaus (son of Lagus) priest, general and brother of Ptolemy I Soter
- Menelaus, father of the cavalry officer Philip (son of Menelaus)
- Menelaus of Pelagonia honoured in Athens
