= Siege of Olynthus (348 BC) =

- Part of the Third Sacred War
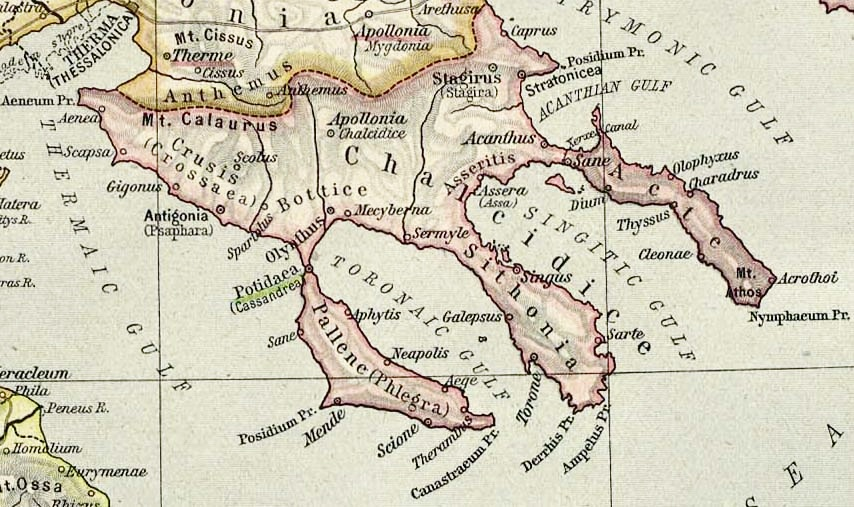
- A map of ancient Chalcidice
Date	348 BC
Location	Olynthus, Central Macedonia, Greece 40.296°N 23.354°E
Result	Macedonian victory

Belligerents
Macedonia	Olynthus

Commanders and leaders
Philip II of Macedon, Hipponicus	Lasthenes, Euthycrates
- Location of Olynthus within Greece Location of Olynthus within Europe

The siege of Olynthus was fought in 348 BC between Philip II of Macedon and Olynthians at the ancient city Olynthus. After invading the Chalcidian League in 349 BC, Philip II directed his forces to besiege the last remaining city in the League, resulting in the eventual destruction of Olynthus and the end to the Chalcidian League.

== Background ==
During the Social War (357–355 BC), Philip II formed an alliance with the Chalcidian League. Subsequently, alarmed by the growth of Philip's power, the Olynthus-led Chalcidian League began to align with Athens, causing tension in their relations. Allegedly, Olynthus also granted refuge to Philip's two half-brothers, Arridaeus and Menelaus, pretenders to the Macedonian throne, possibly triggering the war against the Chalcidian League in summer of 349 BC.

According to Bibliotheca Historica by Diodorus Siculus, during the incursion into the Chalcidian League, Philip II besieged the town of Zereia and subdued other towns into capitulation. Several towns such as Toroni and Mecyberna, a port of Olynthus, surrendered without battles. In the end, Olynthus offered peace but was rejected by Philip II, who proceeded to lay siege on the city.

During the war, Olynthus allied with Athens. The city also made several appeals to Athens for assistance and received reinforcements. On the first appeal, Olynthus was sent 2000 peltasts along with 30 triremes led by Chares in summer of 349 BC. It further received a mercenary force on the second appeal, and a force composed of civilian hoplites and cavalry units on the third, which arrived too late to relieve Olynthus from the siege as a result of the impediment of the Etesian wind. While the second relief force managed to recapture territories obtained by Philip II in the war, the Olynthians were eventually forced to retreat behind the defensive walls of Olynthus after two lost battles.

== Ancient sources and archaeological findings ==
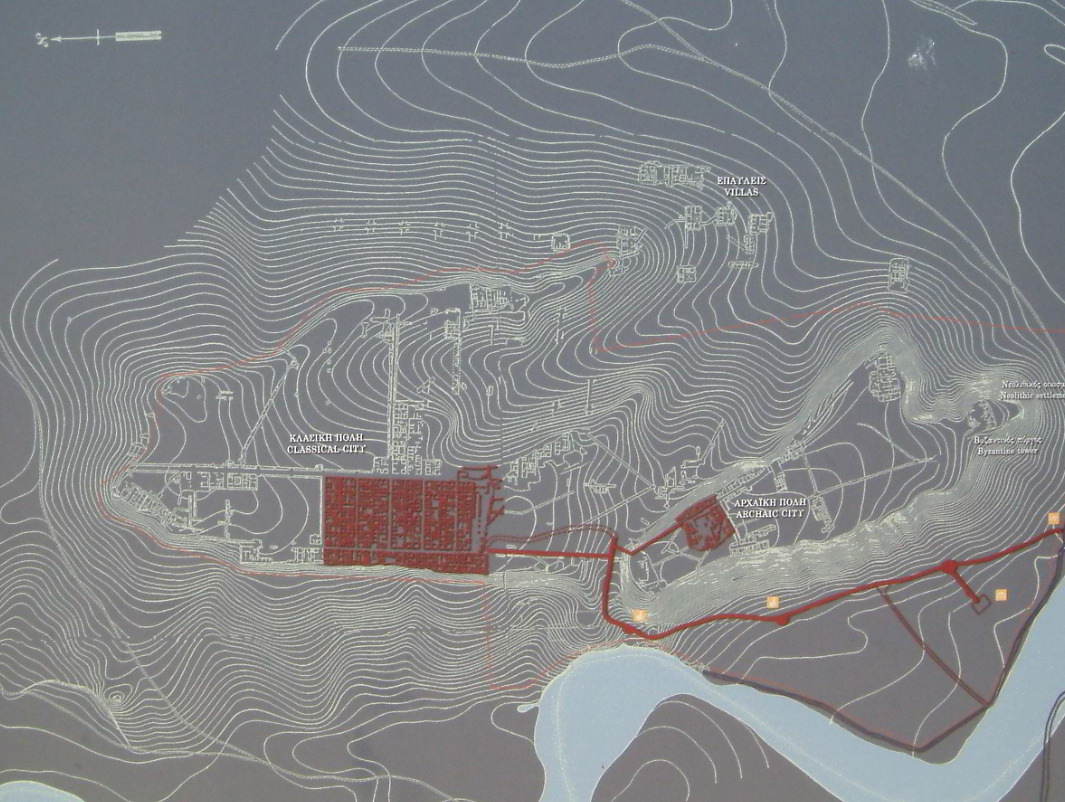
Aerial view of ancient Olynthus, with Classical City being North Hill and Archaic City being South Hill

The account given by Diodorus Siculus in his book Bibliotheca Historica is regarded as the most important ancient source on the siege of Olynthus, which suggests that the treachery of Lasthenes and Euthycrates resulted in the fall of Olynthus in the end.

[...] having taken the field with a large army against the most important of the cities in this region, Olynthus, he first defeated the Olynthians in two battles and confined them to the defence of their walls; then in the continuous assaults that he made he lost many of his men in encounters at the walls, but finally bribed the chief officials of the Olynthians, Euthycrates and Lasthenes, and captured Olynthus through their treachery.

— Diodorus Siculus, Bibliotheca Historica,

Some historians have contested this account. Historian G.L. Cawkwell suggested that the treachery of Lasthenes and Euthycrates could have happened in the two battles prior to the siege, and further questioned that treachery alone did not lead to the fall of Olynthus. Historian Eugene N. Borza suggests that rather than a complete capitulation among the Olynthians following the treachery, some Olynthians took a stand against the Macedonians within the city after the walls were breached. Historian John W.I. Lee also suggests that the treachery merely granted the Macedonians entry into the city but did not lead to capitulation.

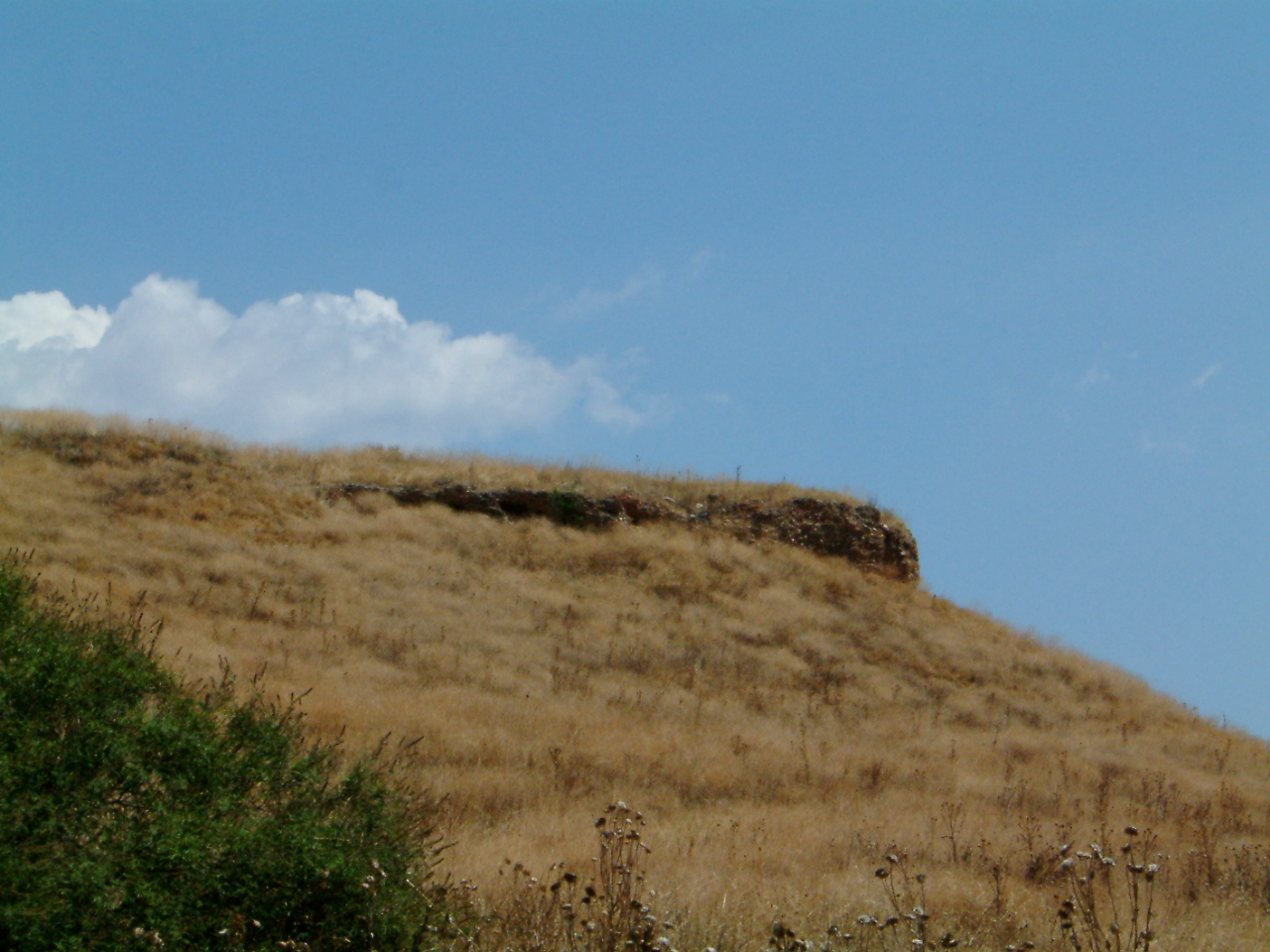
Remains of the South Hill at Olynthus

Archaeological findings at the site of Olynthus reveals evidence that attest to the ancient account of Diodorus. Existing remains of presumably mud brick walls built on stone foundation on the steep western side of North and South Hills indicate pre-existing defensive fortifications in Olynthus, resembling the confinement of defensive walls. Missile projectiles, such as lead sling bullets, bronze and iron arrowheads were among the most numerous weapon artifacts unearthed at the site. Of the 500 sling bullets uncovered, 100 were inscribed with 20 various markings, with some bearing the names of Philip II, Hipponicus, and Cleobolus, and others bearing abbreviations associated with Olynthians. According to Nicholas D. Cahill, the east side of South Hill was possibly the place where "continuous assaults" were conducted as a heavy concentration of more than 85 missiles was found at the area. Furthermore, arrowheads were found near the walls of the western side of North Hill, implying that multiple assaults were launched from various directions.

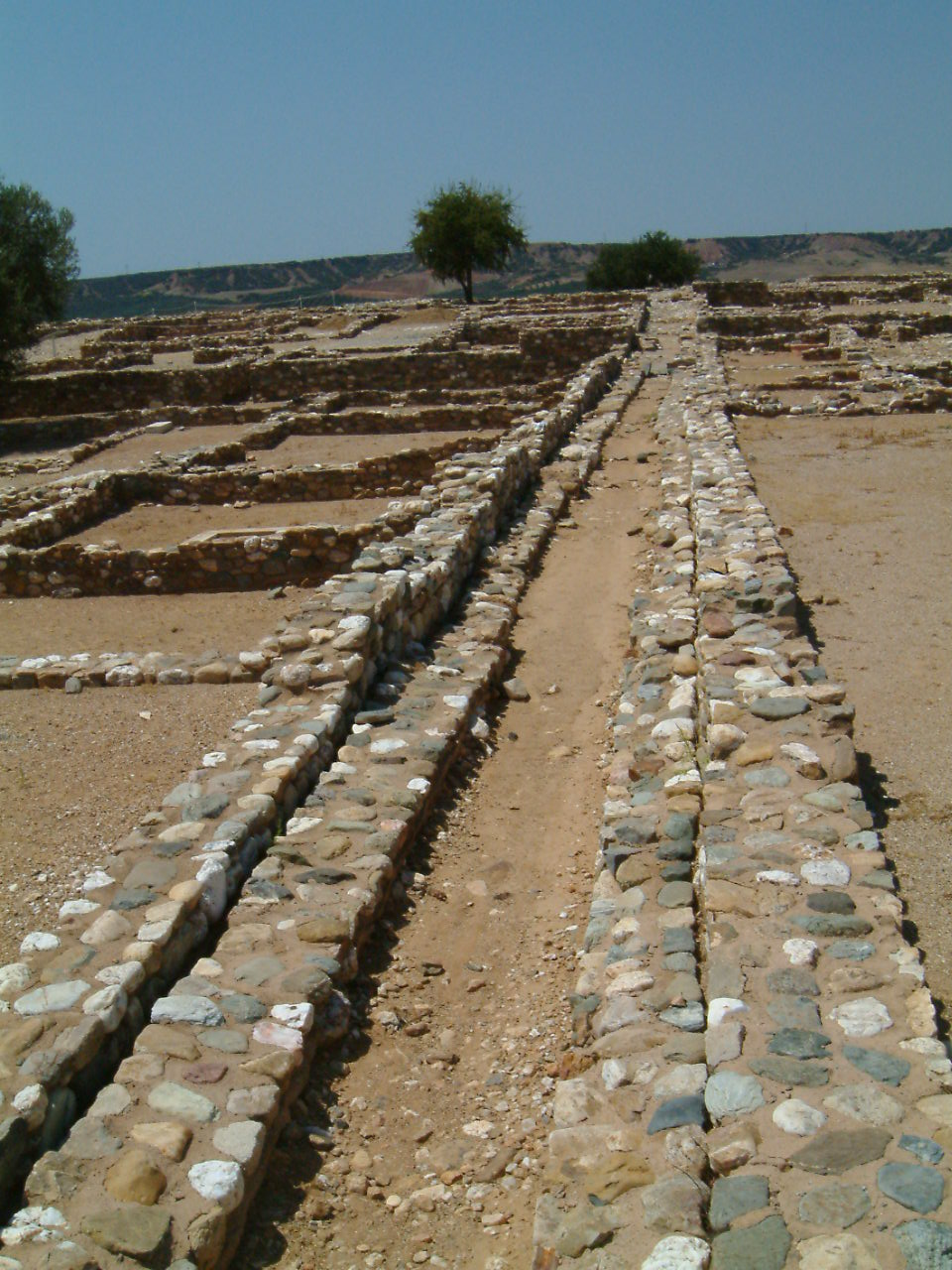
A small road separating two housing blocks on North Hill

Archaeological findings also points to Olynthian resistance after the entry of Macedonians. While the course of combat within the city is subject to conjectures, findings of sling bullets and arrowheads indicate heavy fighting in the streets and houses particularly concentrated in areas near the agora and the adjacent avenue. Given the confines of private houses, Cahill questions the practicality of using slingshots indoors. Lee, on the other hand, argues that the Olynthians could have used the underarmed swing technique to deliver the bullets which uses less space. In addition, deformed sling bullets and arrowheads suggest that the projectiles were discharged at human targets rather than accidentally dropped. At the site, non-missile artifacts are significantly lower in numbers than missile projectiles found with only a handful of iron blades and spearheads along with one hoplite shield unearthed. Despite this, Lee suggests that melee weapons could have been utilized in conjunction with slingshots and bows.

== Aftermath ==
After the fall of Olynthus, Philip II held an Olympic festival at Dium to celebrate his victory. Feasts and competitions were organized for the occasion.

According to Diodorus Siculus, after Olynthus was captured, its population was sold into slavery and the city was razed. Archaeological findings at the site also indicate intense burning of houses and extensive looting of valuables.

In the "Third Philippic", Demosthenes describes the devastation of Olynthus:

I pass over Olynthus and Methone and Apollonia and the two and thirty cities in or near Thrace, all of which Philip has destroyed so ruthlessly that a traveler would find it hard to say whether they had ever been inhabited.

— Demosthenes, Third Philppic,

However, archaeological findings reveal this account to be exaggerated. In 1934, after uncovering Macedonian coins, archaeologist D.M. Robinson argued that the Northwest quarter of the city was reoccupied until the reign of Cassander while the rest of the city was never reoccupied after 348 BC. Other historians also debated the possibility of reoccupation within the city after its destruction.

Archaeological evidence shows that the north-western section of the North Hill in Olynthus was possibly reoccupied with 44 out of 55 datable Macedonian royal coins from 348 - 316 BC found in houses in that section. Few sporadic discoveries of datable coins were also found in the rest of the city.

The remaining population of Olynthus was eventually gathered and forced to move into the city of Cassandreia.
