= Argaeus II of Macedon =

4th-century BC pretender to the Macedonian throne

King of Macedonia
- Reign: 393 – 392 BC
- Predecessor: Amyntas III
- Successor: Amyntas III
- Dynasty: Argead dynasty
- Father: Archelaus I
- Religion: Ancient Greek religion

Argaeus II (Ancient Greek: Ἀργαῖος, romanized: Argaios) was a pretender to the Macedonian crown. He may have been a Lynkestian ruler.

== War with Amyntas III ==
Argaeus II was a son of Archelaus I (ruled 413–399 BC). With the assistance of the Illyrians, Argaeus II expelled King Amyntas III from his dominions in 393 BC and kept possession of the throne for about a year. With the aid of the Thessalians, Amyntas III later succeeded in expelling Argaeus II and recovering a part of his kingdom in 392 BC.

== New Pretender ==
35 years later, in 359, another Argaeus or Argeus appeared as a pretender to the throne; he may have been the same person as Argaeus II of Macedon. This Argaeus had persuaded the Athenians to support his claim to the Macedonian throne, but Philip II, who had just succeeded to the regency of the kingdom, persuaded the Athenians to remain inactive.

With a force of mercenaries, some Macedonian exiles and a number of Athenian troops (who were permitted to join the Macedonians by their general, Manlias), Argaeus made an attempt to take Aegae, but was repulsed. On his retreat to Methone, he was intercepted by Philip and defeated. Argaeus was either killed in the battle or executed afterward.

== Bibliography ==
- Palairet, Michael (2016). Macedonia: A Voyage through History. Vol. 1, (From Ancient Times to the Ottoman Invasions). Cambridge Scholars Publishing. ISBN 9781443888431.

Preceded by Amyntas III	King of Macedon; 393 BC–392 BC	Succeeded by Amyntas III
