= Pausanias (pretender) =

4th-century BC pretender to Macedonian kingship

Pausanias (Greek: Παυσανίας), also known as Pausanias the Pretender, was an ancient Macedonian who claimed the right the Macedonian throne around 360–359 BCE after the death of king Perdiccas III of Macedon. He was one of at least three claimants, the others being Philip II (who deposed Amyntas IV), Argeus (supported by Athens). Pausanias was initially supported by the Odrysian king Cotys I on the condition of giving the latter the wealthy Macedonian port city of Amphipolis to Thrace, but Philip managed to bribe Cotys into peace.It is unclear what happened to Pausanias after this, but he was probably assassinated on the orders of Philip II.
