= Ptolemy of Aloros =

Regent of Macedon from 368 to 365 BC

Ptolemy of Aloros (Ancient Greek: Πτολεμαῖος), was sent by King Amyntas III of Macedon as an envoy to Athens c. 375–373 BC. After Amyntas' death, he began a liaison with his widow, Eurydice. In 368 BC, he assassinated her son, Alexander II, in order to gain control of the throne. His actions were not well-regarded by the leading families of Macedon, who called in the Theban general, Pelopidas, to re-establish peace. As part of the peace settlement, Philip, Alexander II's younger brother, was taken as a hostage back to Thebes. As Alexander II's younger brother, Perdiccas III, was under-age when Alexander II was killed, Ptolemy of Aloros ruled as regent.

Ptolemy ruled as a regent for Perdiccas III until Perdiccas killed him in 365 BC.

It is suggested that Ptolemy was descended from Amyntas II's brother, Menelaus, son of Alexander I.
