= Phila of Elimeia =

Spouse of Philip II of Macedon

Phila (Greek: Φίλα τῆς Ἐλίμειας), was a Noble-women and princess from Macedonia, more specifically the region of Elimiotis. Phila was married to King Phillip II of Macedon, in a geopolitical alliance that unified North and South Macedonia. She became stepmother to Alexander the Great, through this marriage to King Phillip

== Family and lineage ==
Philla was the sister of Derdas and Machatas of Elimeia, was the first or second wife of Philip II of Macedon. Philip practised polygamy, so historians are unsure of the exact order of his marriages.
