= Perdiccas III of Macedon =

King of Macedonia from 365 to 360 BC

Perdiccas III
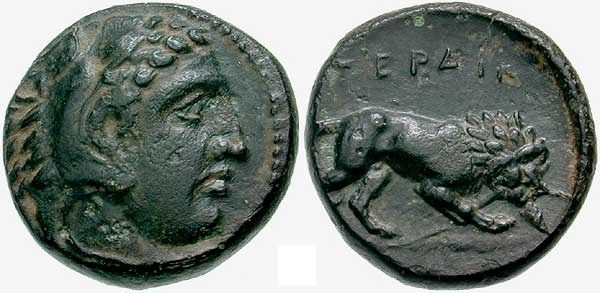
- stater of Perdikkas III

King of Macedonia
- Reign: 365–360 BC
- Predecessor: Alexander II
- Successor: Amyntas IV
- Died: 360 BC
- Issue: Amyntas IV
- Dynasty: Argead dynasty
- Father: Amyntas III
- Mother: Eurydice I
- Religion: Ancient Greek religion

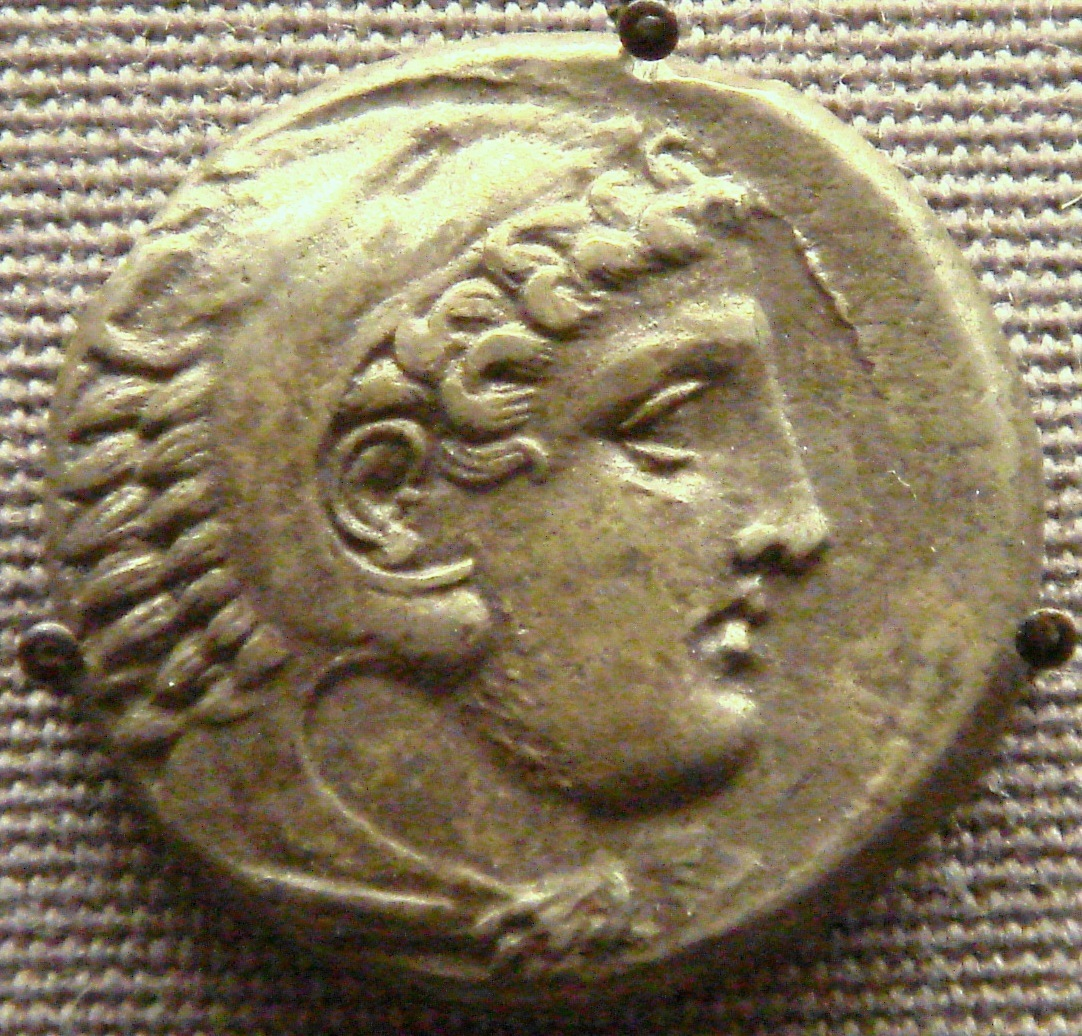
Coin of Perdiccas III, with figure of Herakles.

Perdiccas III (Greek: Περδίκκας Γ΄) was king of the Hellenic kingdom of Macedonia from 365 BC to 360 BC, succeeding his brother Alexander II.

== History ==
Son of Amyntas III and Eurydice, he was a child when in 369 BC his brother Alexander II was killed by their brother-in-law Ptolemy of Aloros, who then ruled as regent. In 365 BC, Perdiccas killed Ptolemy and assumed government.

There is very little information about the reign of Perdiccas III. He was at one time engaged in hostilities with Athens over Amphipolis, and he was distinguished for his patronage of men of letters. Among these we are told that Euphraeus of Oreus, a disciple of Plato, rose so high in Perdiccas's favour as to completely govern the young king and to exclude from his society all but philosophers and geometers.

He also served as theorodokos in the Panhellenic Games that took place in Epidaurus around 360/359 BC.

In 360 BC, Perdiccas tried to reconquer upper Macedonia from the Illyrian Bardylis, but the expedition ended in disaster, with Perdiccas being killed. Diodorus Siculus attests that four thousand men had died in the expedition, and that the remainder, panic-stricken, had become exceedingly afraid of the Illyrian armies and had lost heart for continuing the war.

== Succession ==
Perdiccas was succeeded by his infant son, Amyntas IV. The throne was soon usurped by Perdiccas's younger brother Philip II.

== See also ==
- Argead dynasty
- Pella

Perdiccas III of Macedon Argead dynasty Born: Unknown Died: 359 BC
Preceded by Alexander II	King of Macedon; 365–360 BC	Succeeded by Amyntas IV
