= Amyntas IV =

King of Macedonia in 359 BC

King of Macedonia
- Reign: 359 BC
- Predecessor: Perdiccas III
- Successor: Philip II
- Born: c. 365 BC
- Died: 336 BC
- Spouse: Cynane (cousin)
- Issue: Eurydice II of Macedon
- Dynasty: Argead dynasty
- Father: Perdiccas III of Macedon

Amyntas IV (Greek: Ἀμύντας Δ΄) was a titular king of the kingdom of Macedonia in 359 BC and member of the Argead dynasty.

== Biography ==
Amyntas was a son of King Perdiccas III of Macedon. He was born in about 365 BC.

After his father's death in 359 BC he became king, but he was only a child. His uncle, Philip II of Macedon, who was Perdiccas' brother, became his tutor and regent. In that same year, Philip declared himself king of Macedonia, expropriating his young nephew.

Amyntas was not judged as dangerous enough to be a menace to Philip, who even gave him his daughter Cynane in marriage. The succession of Amyntas' cousin Alexander in 336 BC changed things — Alexander immediately had Amyntas executed.

Eurydice II of Macedon was Amyntas' daughter.

Amyntas IV Argead dynasty Born: ca. 365 BC Died: 336 BC
Preceded by Perdiccas III	King of Macedon; 359 BC	Succeeded by Philip II
