= Nicesipolis =

Wife or concubine of king Philip II of Macedon

Nicesipolis or Nicasipolis of Pherae (Greek: Νικησίπολις Nikesipolis), was a Thessalian woman, native of the city Pherae, wife or concubine of king Philip II of Macedon and mother of Thessalonike of Macedon.

There is not much surviving evidence about her background and life but she is likely to have been of noble Thessalian origin and maybe she was a niece of Jason of Pherae. She died 20 days after giving birth to her daughter, Thessalonike, circa 345 BC.

== See also ==
- Museum of the Royal Tombs of Aigai (Vergina)
