= Philip II of Macedon =

King of Macedon from 359 to 336 BC

Philip II
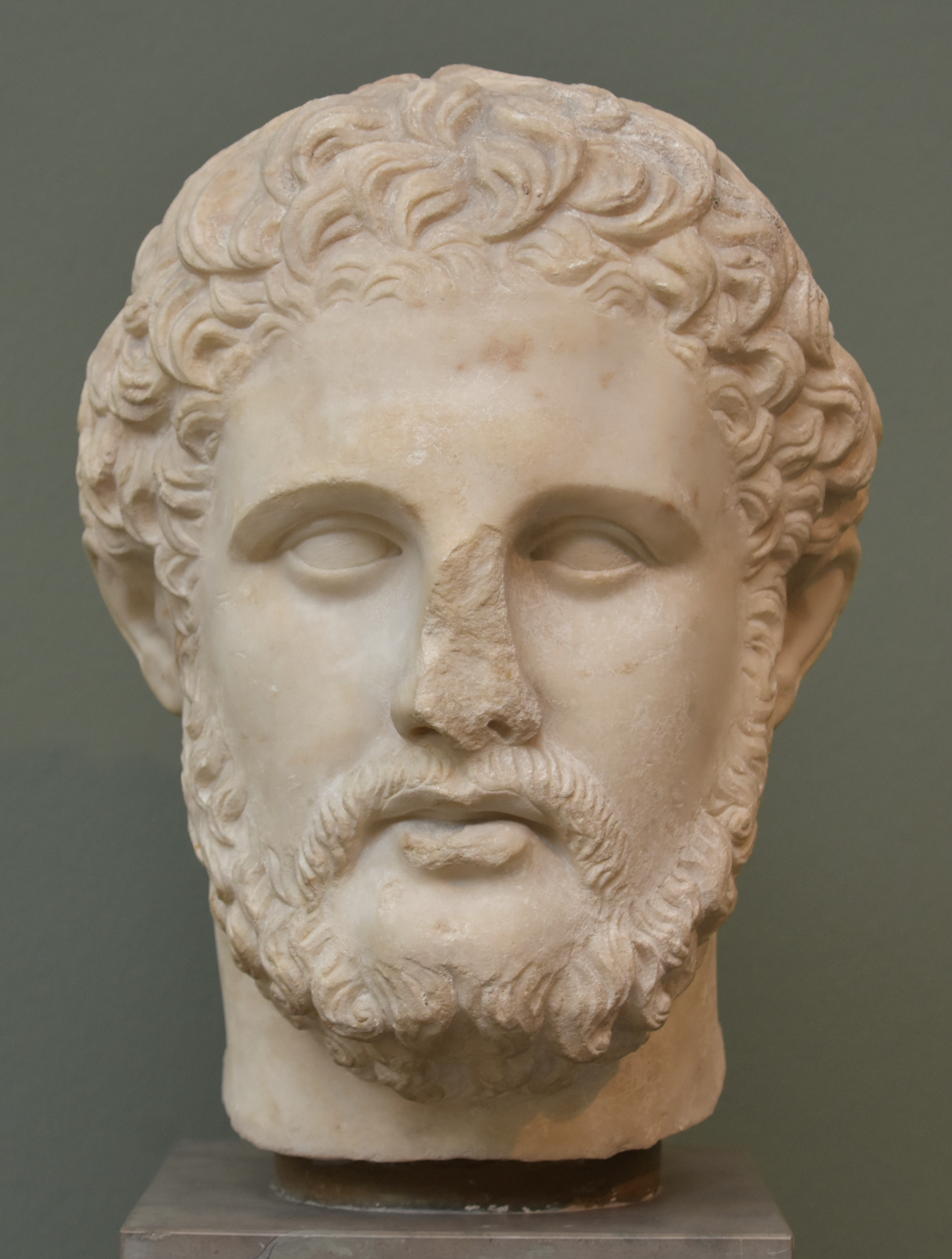
- Bust of Philip II, Roman copy from a Greek original, from the Ny Carlsberg Glyptotek, Copenhagen.

King of Macedonia
- Reign: c. May 359 – October 336 BC
- Predecessor: Amyntas IV
- Successor: Alexander the Great

Hegemon of the Hellenic League
- Reign: 337 BC
- Successor: Alexander the Great
- Born: 382 BC; Pella, Macedon (modern-day Pella, Greece)
- Died: October 336 BC (aged 46); Aigai, Macedon (modern-day Vergina, Greece)
- Burial: Aigai, Macedon (modern-day Vergina, Greece)
- Wives: Audata; Phila; Nicesipolis; Olympias; Philinna; Meda of Odessos; Cleopatra Eurydice
- Issue: Cynane; Philip III; Alexander the Great; Cleopatra; Thessalonica; Europa; Caranus
Names
- Philip II of Macedon
- Greek: Φίλιππος
- House: Argead dynasty
- Father: Amyntas III
- Mother: Eurydice I
- Religion: Ancient Greek religion
- Military career
- Conflicts: Wars of Philip II of Macedon; Battle of Methone; Battle of Erigon Valley; Battle of Amphipolis (357 BC); Pydna and Potidea Campaign; Illyrians Campaign; Battle of Krinides (356 BC); Maroneia Campaign; Siege of Methone (354 BC); Campaign in Thessaly; Siege of Pagasae; Battle of Crocus Field; Olynthian War (349–348 BC); Siege of Perinthus; Scythian Campaign; Battle of Chaeronea (338 BC)

Philip II of Macedon (Ancient Greek: Φίλιππος, romanized: Phílippos; 382 BC – October 336 BC) was the king (basileus) of Macedon from 359 BC until his death in 336 BC. The rise of Macedon, from a kingdom initially at the periphery of classical Greek affairs, to a power that came to dominate Ancient Greece in the span of less than 25 years, was largely thanks to the character and policies of Philip. He was the father of Alexander the Great and a member of the ruling Argead dynasty that founded the kingdom of the Macedonians.

Macedon achieved domination over Greece during Philip II's reign by the reformation of the Macedonian army, including the establishment of the Macedonian phalanx, the use of combined arms tactics and his extensive use of siege engines and artillery, as well as by the use of effective diplomacy and marriage alliances. After defeating the Greek city-states of Athens and Thebes at the Battle of Chaeronea in 338 BC, Philip II led the effort to establish a federation of Greek states known as the Hellenic League, with him as the elected hegemon and commander-in-chief of Greece for a planned invasion of the Achaemenid Empire. However, his assassination by a royal bodyguard, Pausanias of Orestis, led to the immediate succession of his son Alexander, who would go on to invade the Achaemenid Empire in his father's stead.

== Early life ==
Philip was born in either 383 or 382 BC, and was the youngest son of King Amyntas III and Eurydice of Lynkestis. He had two older brothers, Alexander II and Perdiccas III, as well as a sister named Eurynoe. Amyntas later married another woman, Gygaea, with whom he had three sons, Philip's half-brothers Archelaus, Arrhidaeus, and Menelaus.

After the assassination of Alexander II, Philip was sent as a hostage to Illyria by Ptolemy of Aloros. Philip was later held in Thebes (c. 368–365 BC), which at the time was the leading city of Greece. While in Thebes, Philip received a military and diplomatic education from Epaminondas, and lived with Pammenes, who was an enthusiastic advocate of the Sacred Band of Thebes.

In 364 BC, Philip returned to Macedon. In 359 BC, perhaps in May, Philip's other brother, King Perdiccas III, died in battle against the Illyrians. Before leaving, Perdiccas had appointed Philip as regent for his infant son Amyntas IV, but Philip succeeded in taking the kingdom for himself.

Philip's military skills and expansionist vision of Macedonia brought him early success. He first had to remedy the woes over Macedonian territory faced by his throne's government. This was a predicament that had greatly worsened through Macedonia's defeat by the Illyrians, a struggle in which King Perdiccas himself had died. The Paeonians and the Thracians had sacked and invaded the eastern regions of Macedonia, while the Athenians had landed at Methoni on the coast with a contingent under the Macedonian pretender Argaeus II.

== Military career ==
=== Improvements to the army ===
Philip pushed back the Paeonians and Thracians promising tributes, and defeated the 3,000 Athenian hoplites (359 BC). Momentarily free from his opponents, he concentrated on strengthening his internal position and, above all, his army. Philip II made many notable contributions to the Macedonian army. The cavalry, which were the primary source of the army's strength, went from a force of 600 to 4000 from the time of the battles with the Illyrians to 334 BC. The discipline and training of the soldiers increased as well, and the Macedonian soldiers under Philip were provided with the possibility of promotion through the ranks and rewards and bonus wages for exceptional service. In addition to these changes, Philip created the Macedonian phalanx, an infantry formation that consisted of soldiers all armed with a sarissa. Philip is credited for adding the sarissa to the Macedonian army, where it soon was the common weapon used by most soldiers.

=== Early military career ===
The following year (358 BC), Philip heard that the Paeonian king, Agis, had died. Taking advantage of their political disarray and transition of power, Philip marched his army into Paeonia, where he defeated the Paeonians. He then compelled the tribe to swear allegiance to Macedon.

Philip had married Audata, daughter or granddaughter of the Illyrian king Bardylis. However, this marriage did not prevent him from marching against the Illyrians in 358 BC and defeating them at the battle of Erigon Valley, in which some 7,000 Illyrians died (357 BC). By this move, Philip established his authority inland as far as Lake Ohrid and earned the favour of the Epirotes.

After securing the western and southern borders of Macedon, Philip went on to besiege Amphipolis in 357 BC. The Athenians had been unable to conquer Amphipolis, which commanded the gold mines of Mount Pangaion, so Philip reached an agreement with Athens to lease the city to them after his conquest, in exchange for Pydna (which was lost by Macedon in 363 BC). However, after conquering Amphipolis, Philip captured Pydna for himself and kept both cities (357 BC). Athens soon declared war against him, and as a result, Philip allied Macedon with the Chalcidian League of Olynthus. He subsequently conquered Potidaea, this time keeping his word and ceding it to the League in 356 BC.

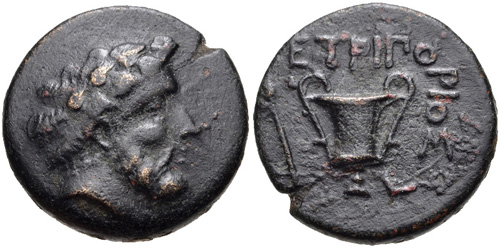
Coin of the western Odrysian king Cetriporis, who was subjugated by Philip in the late 350s

In 357 BC, Philip married the Epirote princess Olympias, who was the daughter of the king of the Molossians. Alexander was born in 356 BC, the same year as Philip's racehorse won at the Olympic Games.

During 356 BC, Philip conquered the town of Crenides and changed its name to Philippi. He then established a powerful garrison there to control its mines, which yielded much of the gold he later used for his campaigns. In the meantime, his general Parmenion defeated the Illyrians again.

In 355–354 BC, he besieged Methone, the last city on the Thermaic Gulf controlled by Athens. During the siege, Philip was injured in his right eye, which was later removed surgically. (Note: A special instrument known as the Spoon of Dioclese was used to remove his eye.) Despite the arrival of two Athenian fleets, the city fell in 354 BC. Philip also attacked Abdera and Maronea, on the Thracian coast (354–353 BC).

=== Third Sacred War ===
Map of the territory under the hegemony of Philip II

Philip's involvement in the Third Sacred War (356–346 BC) began in 354 BC. At the request of the Thessalian League, Philip and his army traveled to Thessaly in order to capture Pagasae, resulting in an alliance with Thebes. A year later in 353 BC, Philip was once again asked to assist in battle, but this time against the tyrant Lycophron who was supported by Onomarchus. Philip and his forces invaded Thessaly, defeating 7,000 Phocians and forcing Phayllus, the brother of Onomarchus, to leave.

That same year, Onomarchus and his army defeated Philip in two succeeding battles. Philip returned to Thessaly the next summer, this time with an army of 20,000 infantry, 3,000 cavalry, and the additional support of the Thessalian League's forces. At the Battle of Crocus Field, 6,000 Phocians fell and 3,000 were taken as prisoners and later drowned. This battle earned Philip immense prestige as well as the free acquisition of Pherae. He was made the leader (archon) of the Thessalian League and was able to claim Magnesia and Perrhaebia, which expanded his territory to Pagasae. Philip did not attempt to advance into Central Greece because the Athenians, unable to arrive in time to defend Pagasae, had occupied Thermopylae.

There were no hostilities with Athens yet, but Athens was threatened by the Macedonians. From 352 to 346 BC, Philip did not again travel south. He was active in completing the subjugation of the Balkan hill-country to the west and north, and in reducing the Greek cities of the coast as far as the Hebrus. To the chief of these coastal cities, Olynthus, Philip continued to profess friendship until its neighboring cities were in his hands.

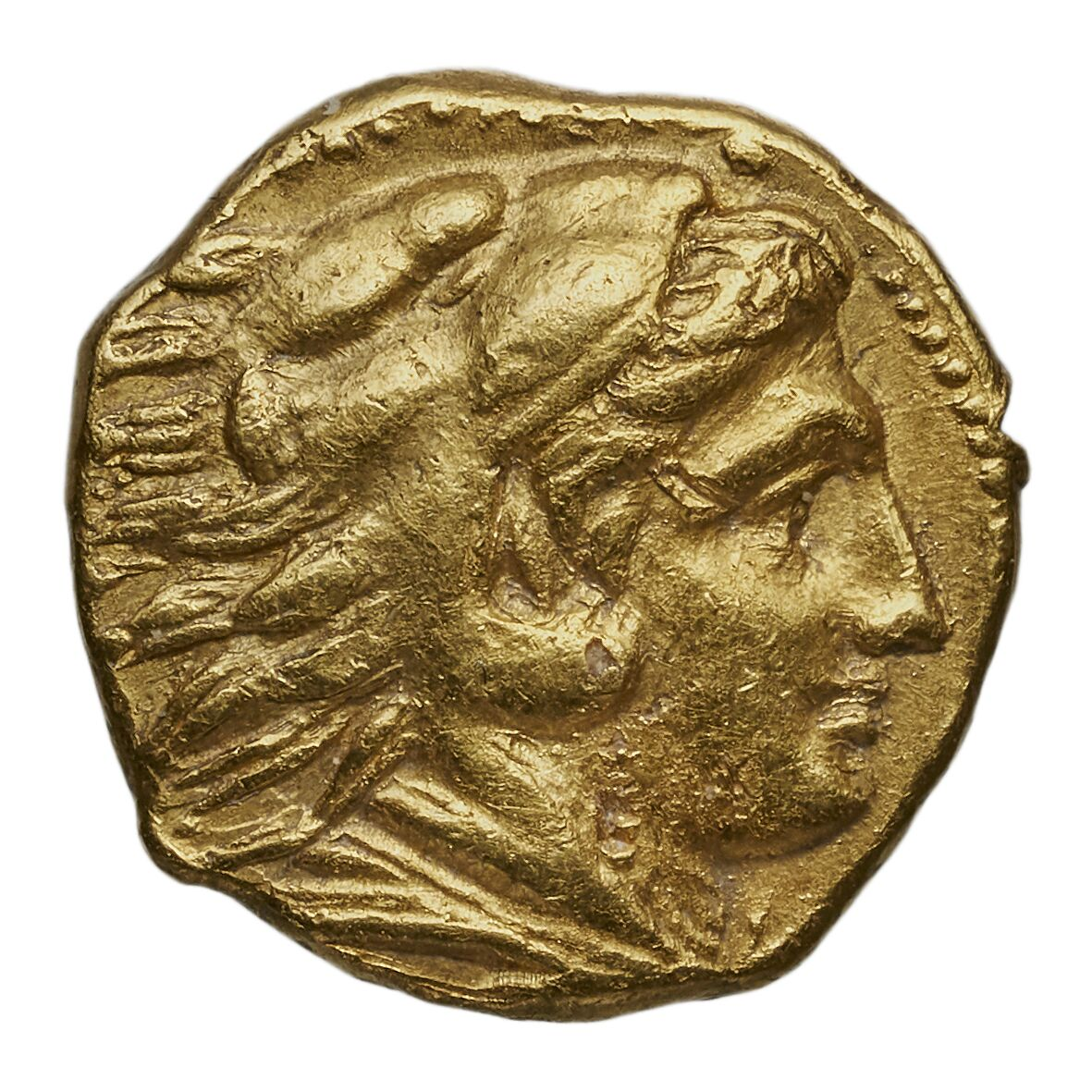
Golden coin featuring a beardless portrait of Philip dated to the reign of his son Alexander, to whom he shows a remarkable resemblance, as well as to the god Apollo.

In 348 BC, Philip started the siege of Olynthus, which, apart from its strategic position, housed his half-brothers, Arrhidaeus and Menelaus, pretenders to the Macedonian throne. Olynthus had at first allied itself with Philip, but later shifted its allegiance to Athens. The latter, however, did nothing to help the city because its expeditions were held back by a revolt in Euboea. The Macedonian king took Olynthus in 348 BC and razed the city to the ground. The same fate was inflicted on other cities of the Chalcidian peninsula, resulting in the Chalcidian League dissolving.

Macedon and the regions adjoining it having now been securely consolidated, Philip celebrated his Olympic Games at Dium. In 347 BC, Philip advanced to the conquest of the eastern districts about Hebrus, and compelled the submission of the Thracian prince Cersobleptes. In 346 BC, he intervened effectively in the war between Thebes and the Phocians, but his wars with Athens continued intermittently. However, Athens had made overtures for peace, and when Philip again moved south, peace was sworn in Thessaly.

=== Later campaigns (346–336 BC) ===
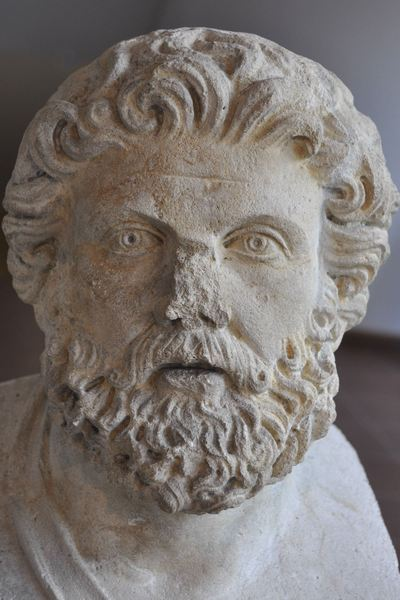
Statue of Philip II, 350–400 AD. Rheinisches Landesmuseum Trier

With key Greek city-states in submission, Philip II turned to Sparta, warning them "If I invade Laconia, I shall turn you out." The Spartans' laconic reply was one word: "If." Philip proceeded to invade Laconia, devastate much of it and eject the Spartans from various parts.

In 345 BC, Philip conducted a hard-fought campaign against the Ardiaioi (Ardiaei), under their king Pleuratus I, during which Philip was seriously wounded in the lower right leg by an Ardian soldier.

In 342 BC, Philip led a military expedition north against the Scythians, conquering the Thracian fortified settlement Eumolpia to give it his name, Philippopolis (modern Plovdiv).

In 340 BC, Philip started the siege of Perinthus, and in 339 BC, began another siege against the city of Byzantium. As both sieges failed, Philip's influence over Greece was compromised. He successfully reasserted his authority in the Aegean by defeating an alliance of Thebans and Athenians at the Battle of Chaeronea in 338 BC, and in the same year, destroyed Amfissa because the residents had illegally cultivated part of the Crisaian plain which belonged to Delphi. These decisive victories led to Philip being recognized as the military leader of the League of Corinth, a Greek confederation allied against the Persian Empire, in 338/7 BC. Members of the league agreed never to wage war against each other, unless it was to suppress revolution.

=== Asian campaign (336 BC) ===
Silver tetradrachm dated to the reign of Philip II. Obv.: laureate head of Zeus facing right; rev.: a youth on horseback advancing right. The legend along the top reads ΦΙΛΙΠΠΟΥ (of Philip) and decisively depicts him as a Greek monarch.

Philip II was involved quite early against the Achaemenid Empire. From around 352 BC, he supported several Persian opponents to Artaxerxes III, such as Artabazos II, Amminapes or a Persian nobleman named Sisines, by receiving them for several years as exiles at the Macedonian court. This gave him a good knowledge of Persian issues, and may even have influenced some of his innovations in the management of the Macedonian state. Alexander was also acquainted with these Persian exiles during his youth.

In 336 BC, Philip II sent Parmenion, with Amyntas, Andromenes and Attalus, and an army of 10,000 men into Asia Minor to make preparations for an invasion to free the Greeks living on the western coast and islands from Achaemenid rule. At first, all went well. The Greek cities on the western coast of Anatolia revolted until the news arrived that Philip had been assassinated and had been succeeded as king by his young son Alexander. The Macedonians were demoralized by Philip's death and were subsequently defeated near Magnesia by the Achaemenids under the command of the mercenary Memnon of Rhodes.

== Marriages and family ==
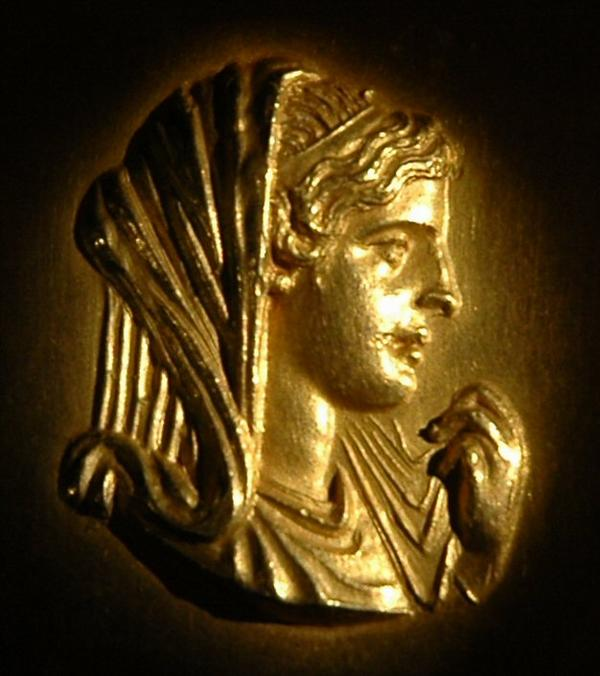
Roman medallion of Olympias, the fourth wife of Philip II and mother of Alexander the Great (Museum of Thessaloniki)

The kings of Macedon practiced polygamy. Philip II had seven wives throughout his life, all members of royalty from foreign dynasties, and all of which were considered queens, making their children royalty as well. The dates of Philip's multiple marriages and the names of some of his wives are contested. Below is the order of marriages:

- Audata, the daughter of Illyrian king Bardyllis. Mother of Cynane.
- Phila of Elimeia, the sister of Derdas and Machatas of Elimiotis.
- Nicesipolis of Pherae, Thessaly, mother of Thessalonica.
- Olympias of Epirus, daughter of Neoptolemus I, mother of Alexander the Great and Cleopatra.
- Philinna of Larissa, mother of Arrhidaeus later called Philip III of Macedon.
- Meda of Odessos, daughter of the king Cothelas, of Thrace.
- Cleopatra, daughter of Hippostratus and niece of general Attalus of Macedonia. Philip renamed her Cleopatra Eurydice of Macedon.

House of Philip II
Individuals with disputed heritage or rule are italicized.
All dates are BC.

Sirras	Arrhidaeus (Note: Arrhidaeus was the son of Amyntas, one of Alexander I's six children.)
Eurydice	Amyntas III (r. 393–369)	Gygaea (Note: Gygaea may have been an Argead, possibly the daughter of Alexander I's son Menelaus or Archelaus.)
Ptolemy of Aloros (r. 368–365)	Eurynoe	Alexander II (r. 369–368)	Perdiccas III (r. 365–360/59)	Archelaus	Arrhidaeus	Menelaus
Amyntas IV (r. 360/59)
Amyntas	Attalus
Adea Eurydice	Neoptolemus I
daughter
Bardylis?	Derdas II	Cothelas
Audata (Note: Audata was Bardylis's close relative, possibly his daughter or granddaughter.)	Phila	Nicesipolis	Philip II (r. 360/59–336)	Philinna	Olympias	Meda	Cleopatra
Cynnane	Cassander (r. 305–297)	Thessalonice	Philip III Arrhidaeus (r. 323–317)	Cleopatra	Alexander I of Epirus	Europa
Roxana	Alexander III (Note: Alexander had relationships with at least two other women, but they produced no known children.) (r. 336–323)	Barsine
Philip IV (r. 297)	Antipater I (r. 297–294)	Alexander V (r. 297–294)	Neoptolemus II	Cadme
Alexander IV (r. 323–310)	Heracles (Note: Heracles was the alleged son of Alexander by Barsine, daughter of the Persian satrap Artabazos. Alexander's relationship with Barsine was viewed as an affair rather than a marriage, and as a result, Heracles was regarded as illegitimate by the Macedonian nobility.)

== Assassination ==
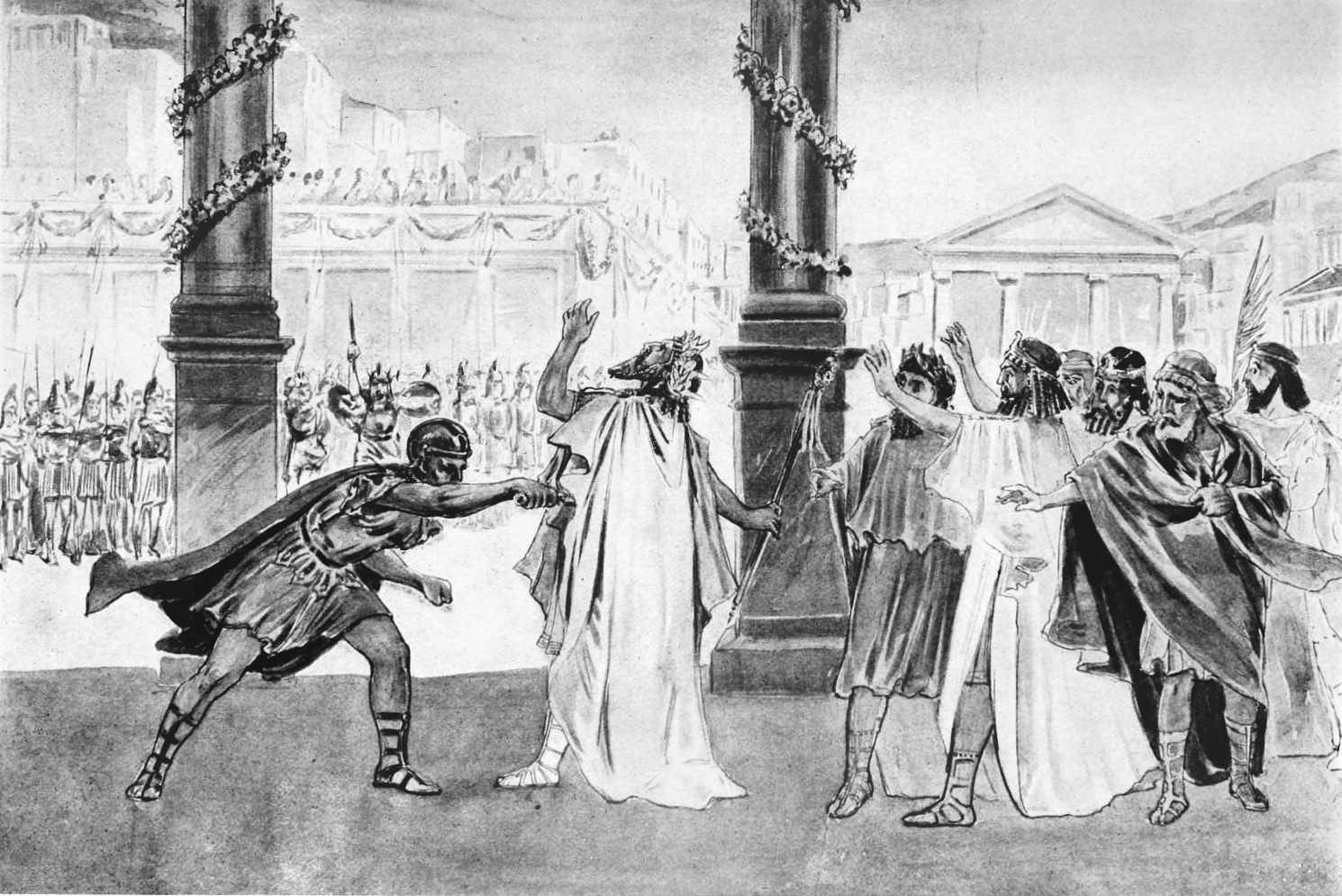
Depiction of Philip's assassination by Pausanias in The Story of the Greatest Nations (c. 1900)

King Philip was assassinated in October 336 BC (perhaps 25 October) at Aigai, the ancient capital of the kingdom of Macedon. Philip and his royal court were gathered in order to celebrate the marriage of Alexander I of Epirus and Cleopatra of Macedon, Philip's daughter by his fourth wife Olympias. While the king was entering into the town's theatre, he was unprotected in order to appear approachable to the Greek diplomats and dignitaries who were present at that time. Philip was suddenly approached by Pausanias of Orestis, one of his seven bodyguards, who was also – according to Diodorus – his lover, and was stabbed in his ribs. After Philip was killed, the assassin immediately tried to escape and reach his getaway associates, who were waiting for him with horses at the entrance to Aegae. The assassin was pursued by three of Philip's other bodyguards, and during the chase, his horse tripped on a vine. He was subsequently stabbed to death by the bodyguards.

The three sons of Aeropus of Lyncestis, a commander disgraced by Philip, were also suspected of taking part in the plot as accomplices of Pausanias. Two brothers, Arrhabaeus and Heromenes, were put to death, while the third son, Alexander of Lyncestis, was pardoned.

The reasons for the assassination are difficult to ascertain. There was controversy even among ancient historians; the only known surviving contemporary account is that of Aristotle, who states simply that Philip was killed because Pausanias had been offended by Attalus (Philip's uncle-in-law) and his friends. Attalus was the uncle of Philip's wife Cleopatra (renamed Eurydice upon marriage).

=== Cleitarchus' analysis ===
Fifty years later, the historian Cleitarchus expanded and embellished the story. Centuries afterwards, this version was propagated by Diodorus Siculus and other historians who relied on Cleitarchus. According to the sixteenth book of Diodorus' history, Pausanias of Orestis had been a lover of Philip, but became jealous when Philip turned his attention to a younger man, also called Pausanias. The elder Pausanias' taunting of the new lover caused the younger Pausanias to throw away his life in battle, which turned his friend Attalus against the elder Pausanias. Attalus took his revenge by getting Pausanias of Orestis drunk at a public dinner and then raping him.

When Pausanias complained to Philip, the king felt unable to chastise Attalus, as he was about to send him to Asia with Parmenion to establish a bridgehead for an invasion he was planning. Also, Philip had recently married Attalus' niece, Cleopatra Eurydice. Rather than offend Attalus, Philip tried to mollify Pausanias by elevating him within his personal bodyguard. Pausanias then seems to have redirected his desire for revenge towards the man who had failed to avenge his damaged honour, and accordingly to plan to kill Philip. Some time after the alleged rape, while Attalus was away in Asia fighting the Persians, he put his plan into action.

=== Justin's analysis ===
Other historians (e.g., Justin 9.7) suggested that Alexander and/or his mother Olympias were at least privy to the intrigue, if not themselves instigators. Olympias seems to have been anything but discreet in manifesting her gratitude to Pausanias, according to Justin's report: He writes that the same night of her return from exile, she placed a crown on the assassin's corpse, and later erected a tumulus over his grave and ordered that annual sacrifices be made to the memory of Pausanias.

=== Modern analysis ===
Some modern historians have claimed that none of the accounts are probable: They say that in the case of Pausanias, the purported motive for the crime hardly seems adequate. Furthermore they claim that implicating Alexander and Olympias in the plot seems specious, to act as they did would have required them to act with an improbable degree of brazen effrontery in the face of a military whose members were personally loyal to Philip. What seems to have been recorded, rather, are simply suspicions that were naturally directed towards the chief beneficiaries of the assassination; however, their actions in response to the murder are hardly evidence of their guilt with respect to the crime itself, regardless of how sympathetic they might have seemed afterward.

Scholar Daniel Ogden has noted that if there was a sexual side to the murder, "then it can be contextualized in this regard against known homosexual relationships in and around the Macedonian court" and that according to Aristotle, the regicide of Archelaus I of Macedon was by his former eromenoi, Crateuas and Hellenocrates of Larissa.

Whatever the actual background to the assassination, it may have had an enormous effect on later world events, far beyond what any conspirators could have predicted. As asserted by some modern historians, had the older and more settled Philip been the one in charge of the war against Persia, he might have been content to make relatively moderate conquests, e.g., making Anatolia into a Macedonian province, and, unlike his son Alexander, not have wanted to push further into an overall conquest of Persia and further campaigns in India.

== Tomb of Philip II at Aigai ==
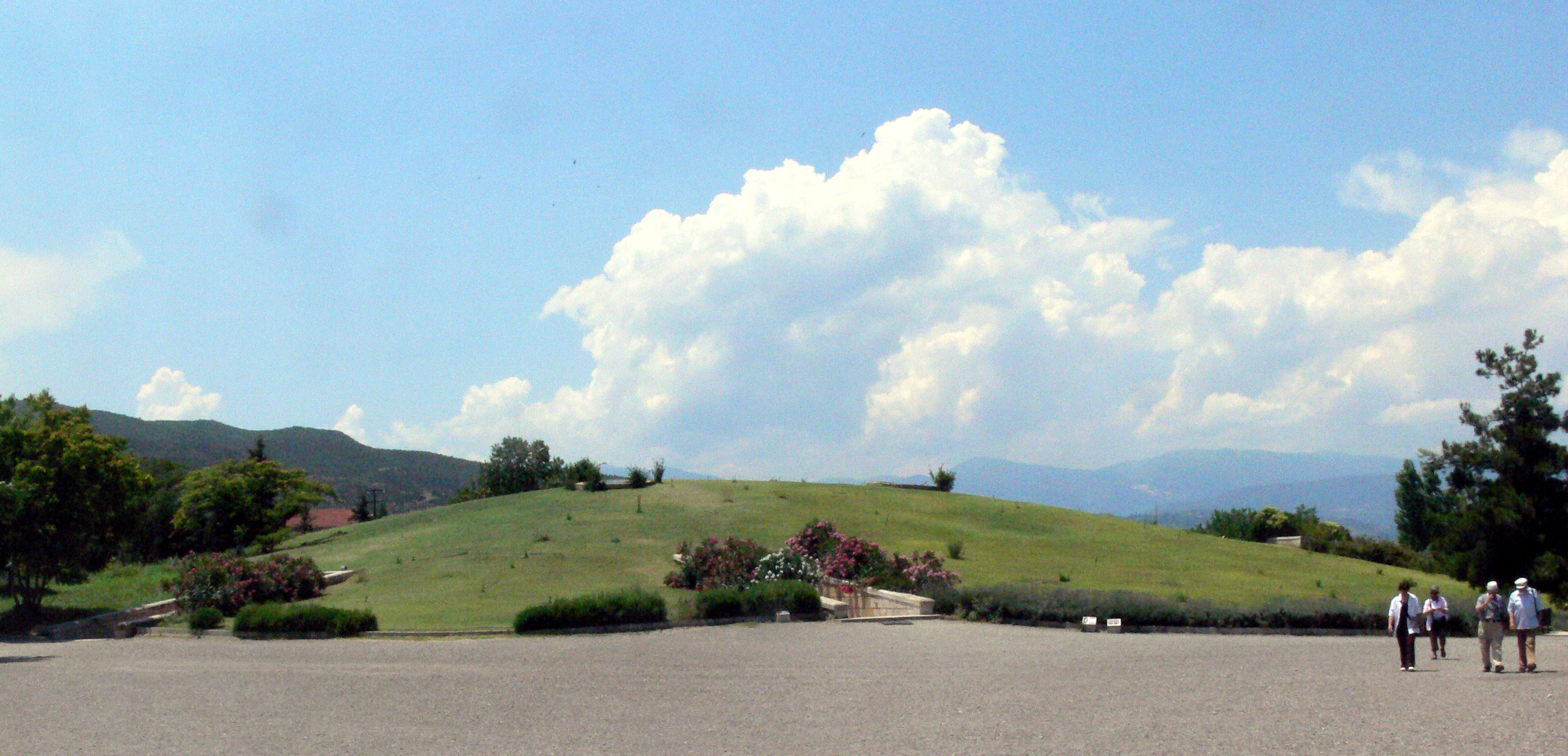
Great Tumulus of Aigai

In 1977, Greek archaeologist Manolis Andronikos started excavating the Great Tumulus at Aigai near modern Vergina, the capital and burial site of the kings of Macedon, and found that two of the four tombs in the tumulus were undisturbed since antiquity. Moreover, these two, and particularly Tomb II, contained fabulous treasures and objects of great quality and sophistication.

Although there was much debate for some years, as suspected at the time of the discovery Tomb II has been shown to be that of Philip II as indicated by many features, including the greaves, one of which was shaped consistently to fit a leg with a misaligned tibia (Philip II was recorded as having broken his tibia). Also, the remains of the skull show damage to the right eye caused by the penetration of an object (historically recorded to be an arrow).

Two scientists who studied some of the bones claimed in 2015 that Philip was buried in Tomb I, not Tomb II. On the basis of age, knee ankylosis, and a hole matching the penetrating wound and lameness suffered by Philip, the authors of the study identified the remains of Tomb I in Vergina as those of Philip II. Tomb II instead was identified in the study as that of King Arrhidaeus and his wife Eurydice II. The Greek Ministry of Culture replied that this claim was baseless, and that the archaeological evidence shows that the ankylotic knee belongs to another body which was thrown or put into Tomb I after this had been looted, and probably between 276/5 and 250 BC. Besides this, the theory that Tomb I belonged to Philip II had previously been shown to be false.

More recent research gives conclusive evidence that Tomb II contains the remains of Philip II and his Thracian wife, Meda. This would mean that the magnificent 5.6-metre wall painting above the entrance could be a hunting scene showing Philip and Alexander.

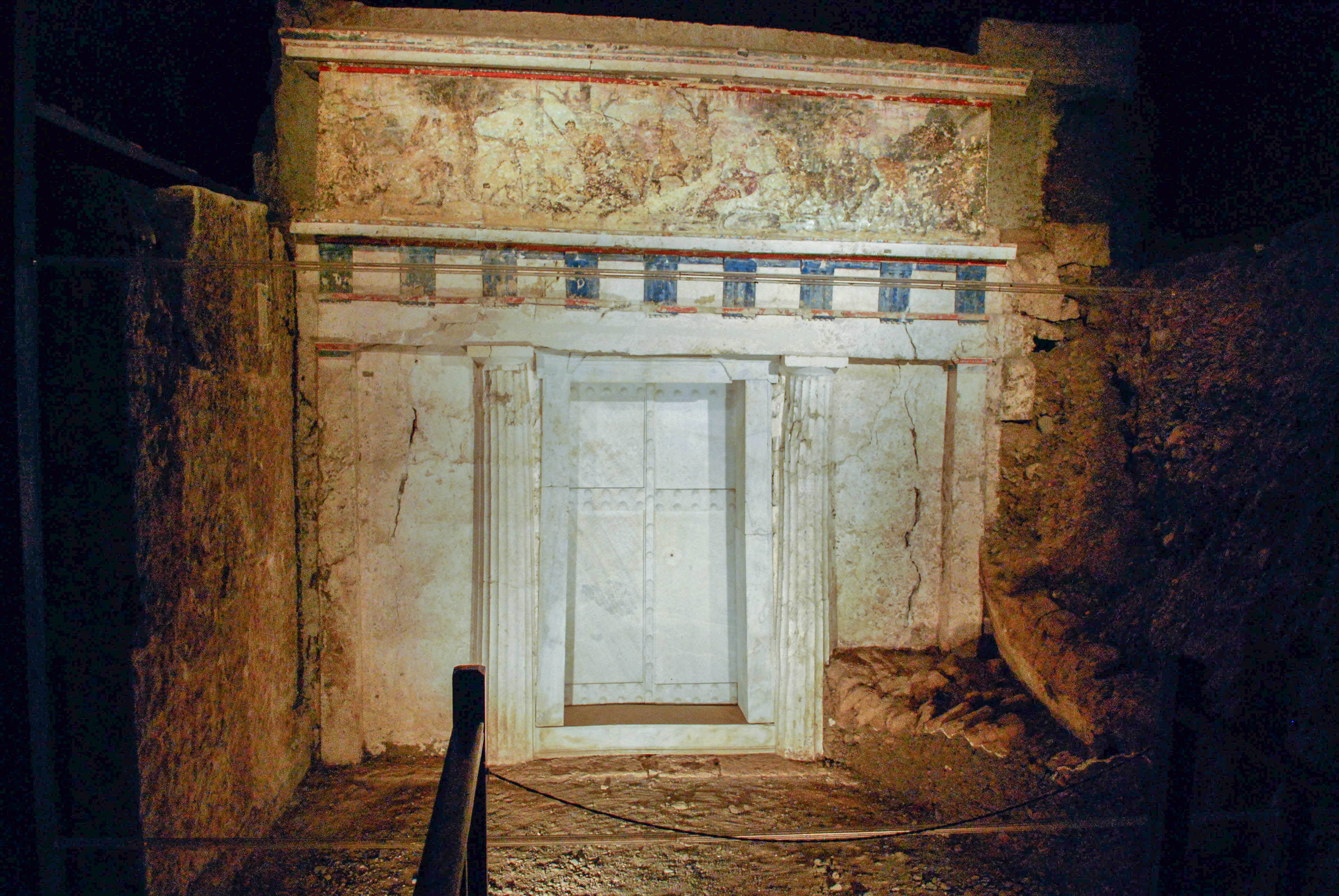
Entrance to the tomb

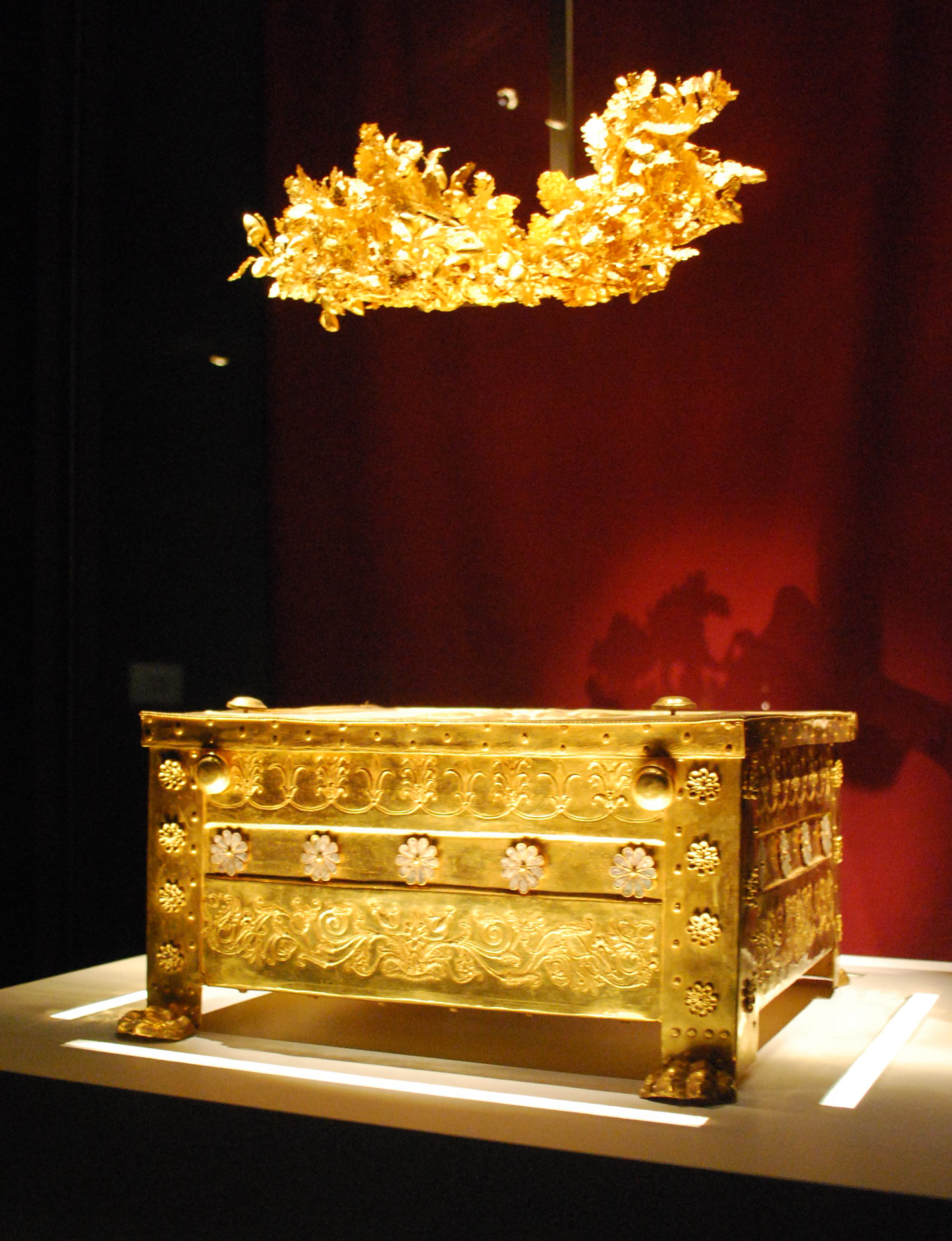
The golden larnax containing the king's bones

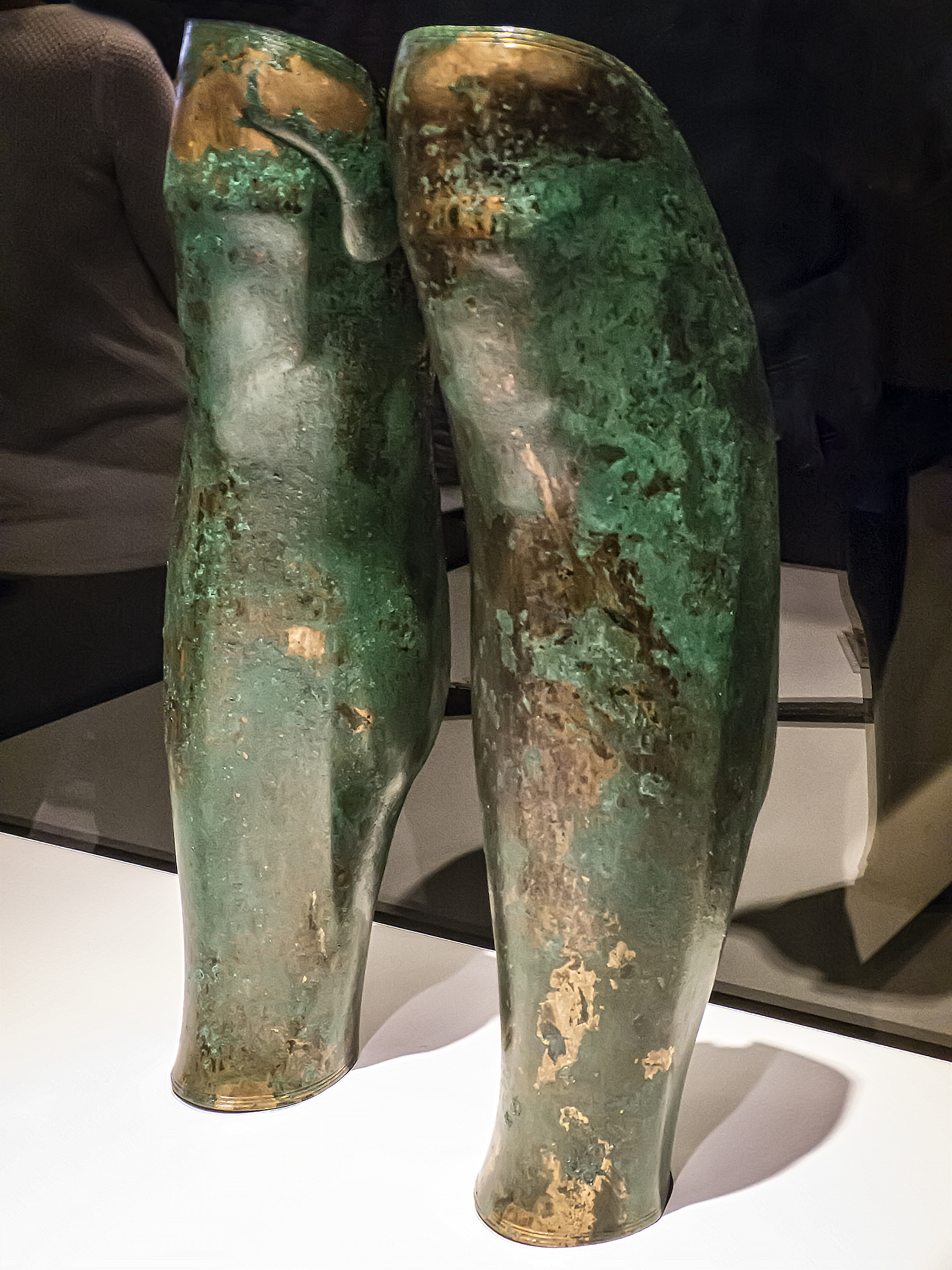
Philip II's bronze greaves

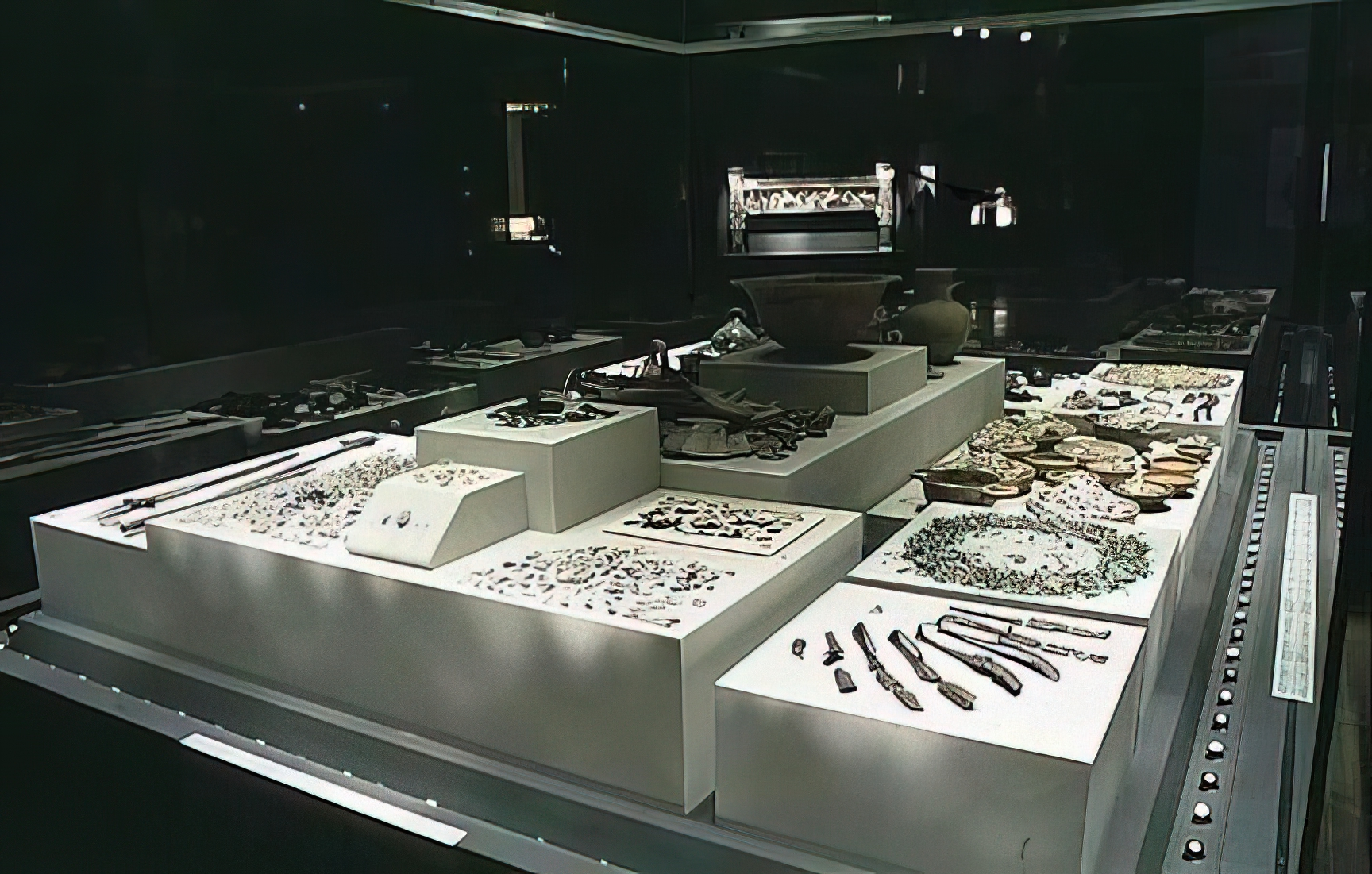
Remains of the funeral pyre and banquet

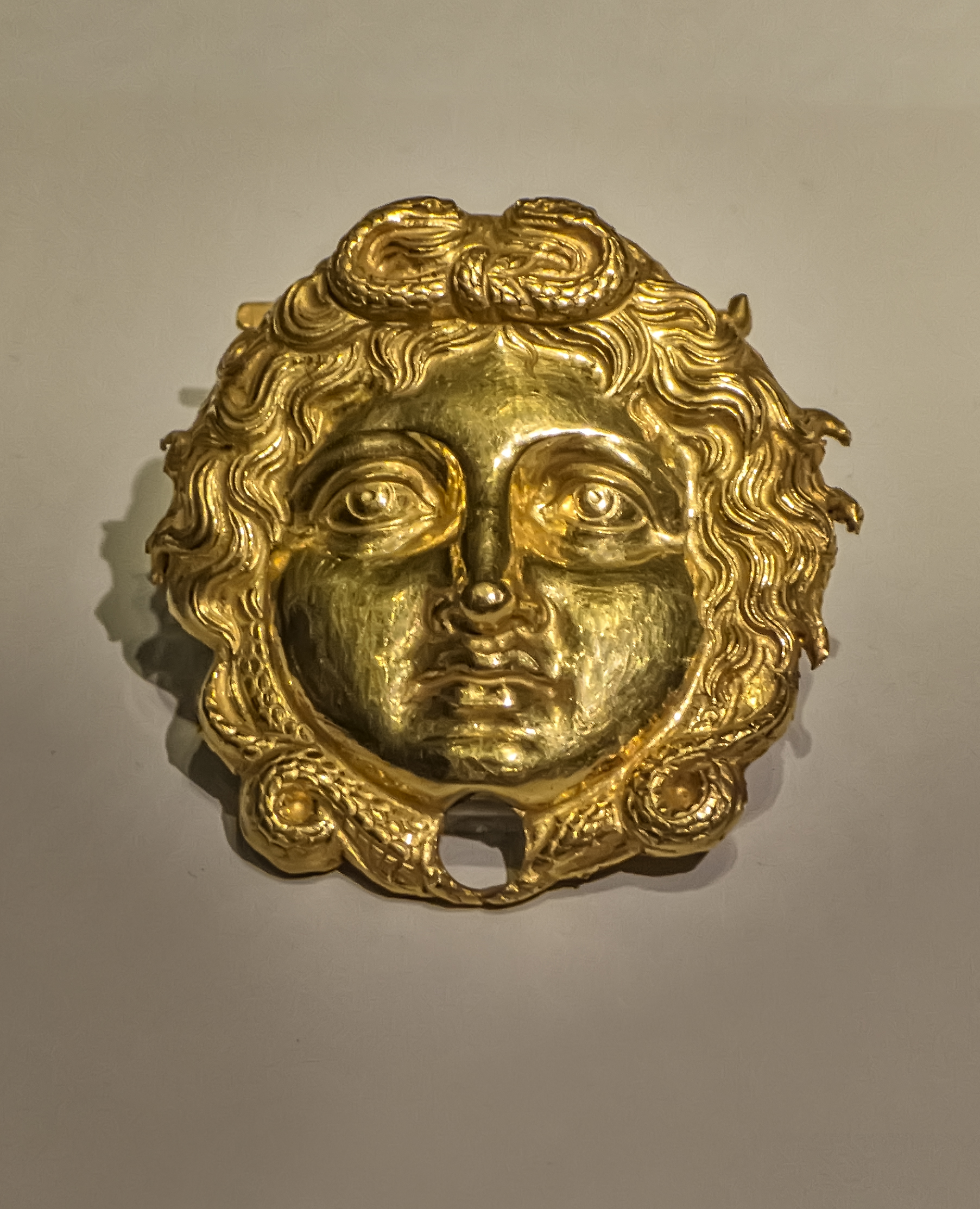
Gold Gorgon Head from Philip's cuirass (breastplate)

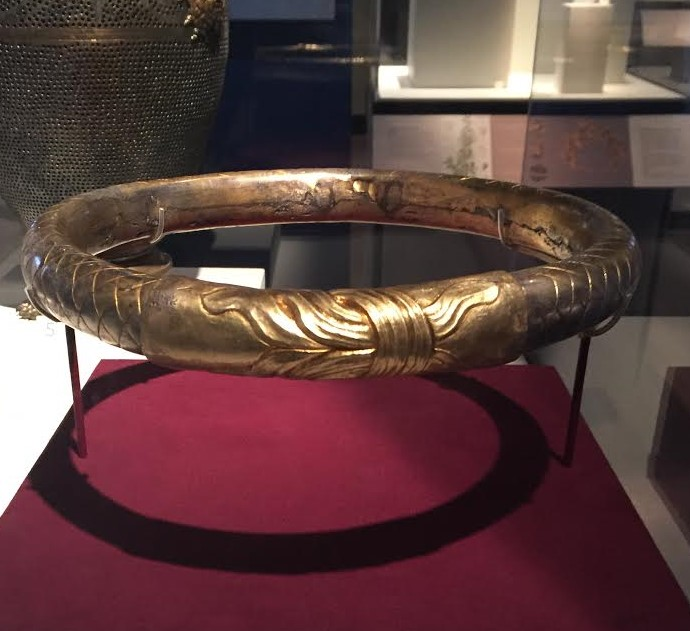
The gilded silver diadem of Philip

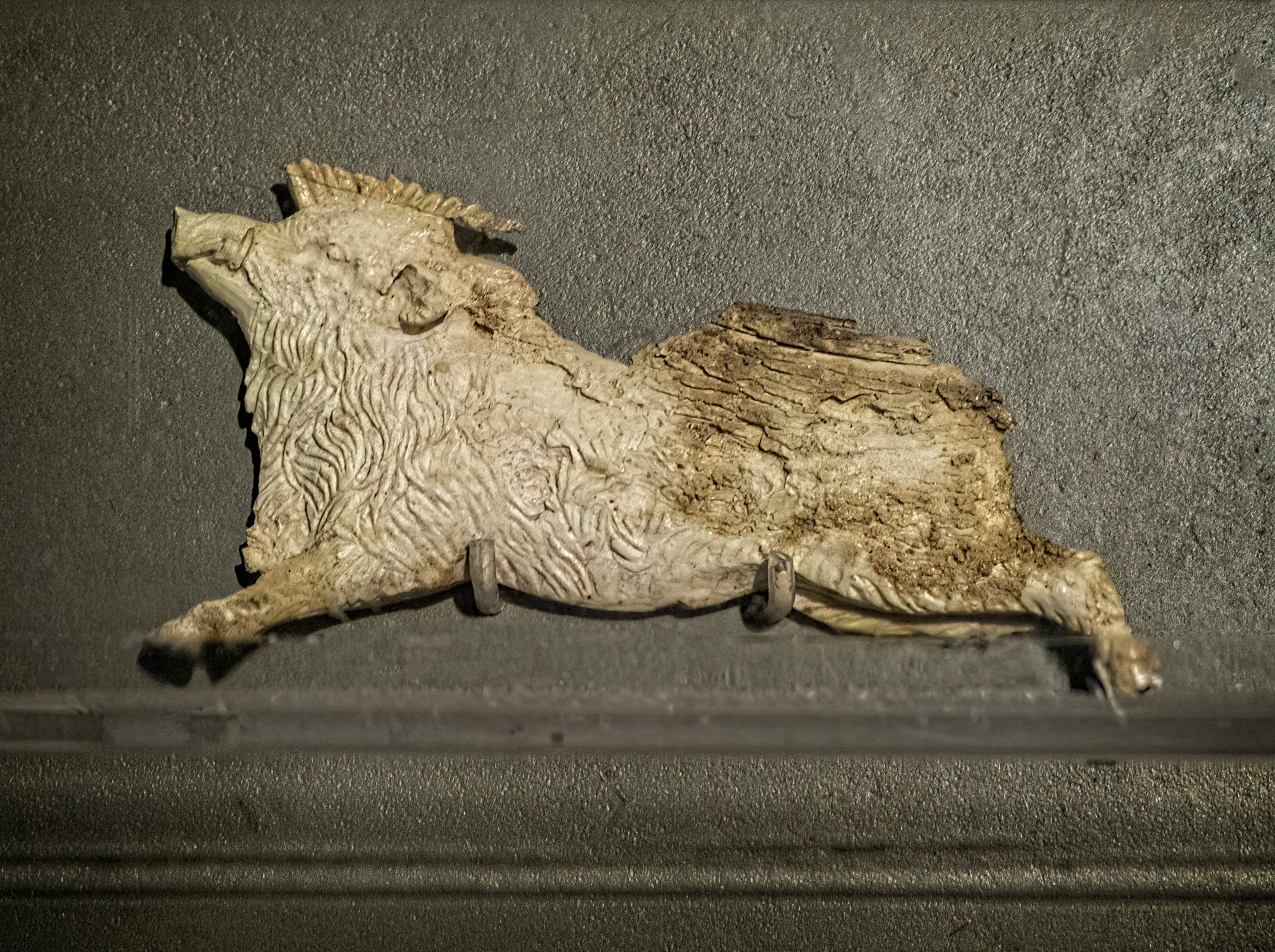
Ivory plaque depicting a boar from the footrest of the funeral couch

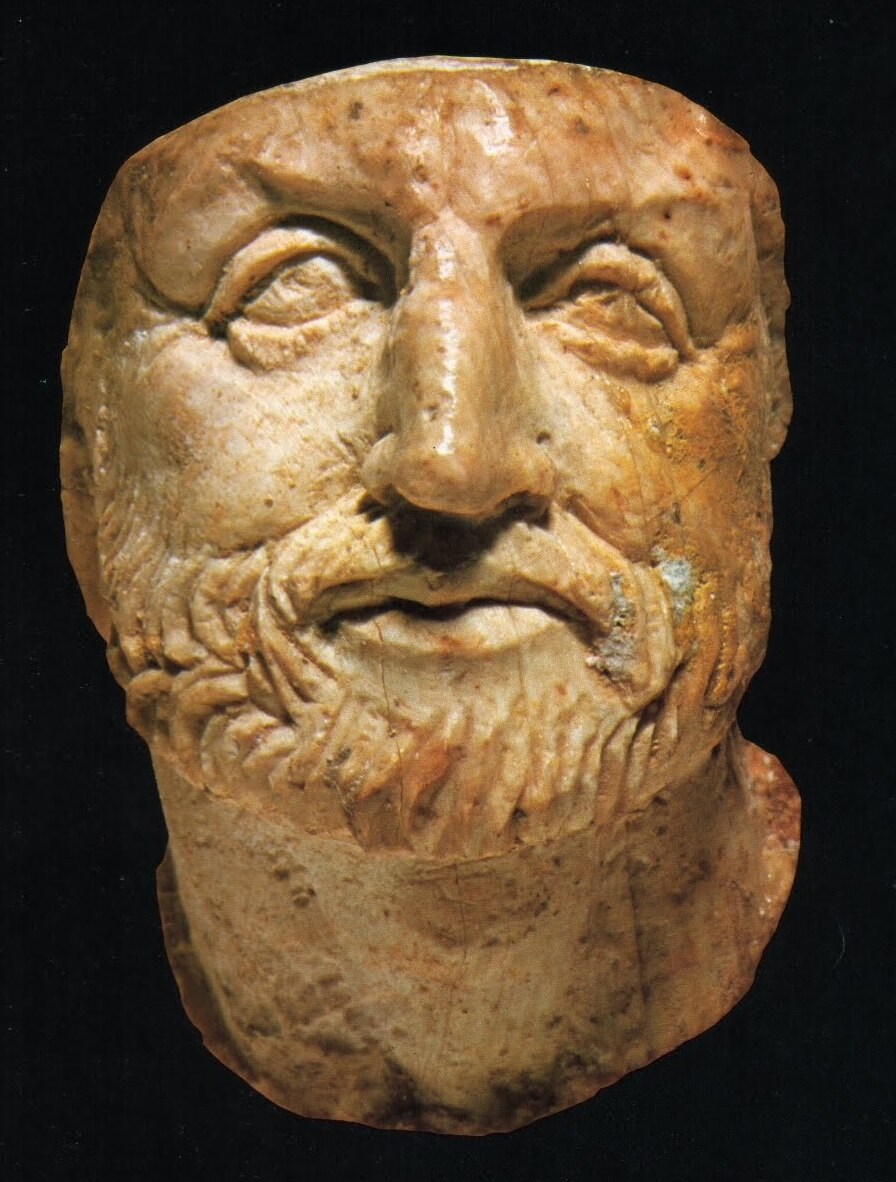
Portrait of Philip carved in Ivory

== Legacy ==
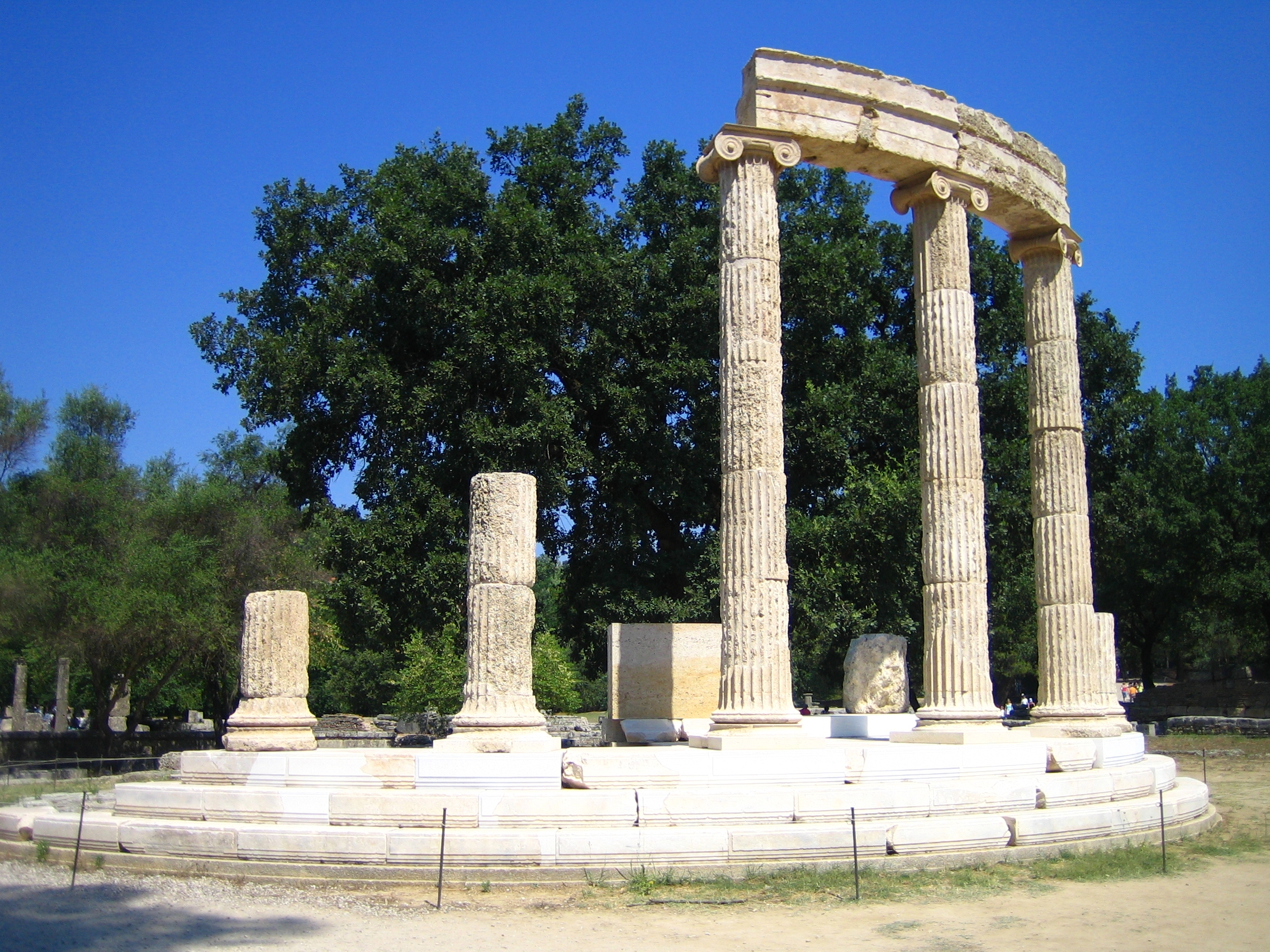
Philip commissioned the construction of the Philippeion at Olympia to commemorate his victory at the Battle of Chaeronea

=== Cult ===
The heroon at Vergina in Macedonia (the ancient city of Aegae – Αἰγαί) is thought to have been dedicated to the worship of the family of Alexander the Great and may have housed the cult statue of Philip. It is probable that he was regarded as a hero or deified on his death. Though the Macedonians did not consider Philip a god, he did receive other forms of recognition from other Greeks, e.g. at Eresos (altar to Zeus Philippeios), Ephesos (his statue was placed in the temple of Artemis), and at Olympia, where the Philippeion was built.

Isocrates once wrote to Philip that if he defeated Persia, there would be nothing left for him to do but to become a god, and Demades proposed that Philip be regarded as the thirteenth god; however, there is no clear evidence that Philip was raised to the divine status accorded his son Alexander.

=== Cities ===
In his newly conquered territories, he founded new cities such as Philippi (modern Filippoi, Greece), Philippopolis (modern Plovdiv, Bulgaria), Herakleia Sintike (modern Rupite, Bulgaria), and Herakleia Lynkestis (modern Bitola, North Macedonia).

=== Biblical reference ===
Philip is mentioned in the opening verse of the deutero-canonical First Book of Maccabees.

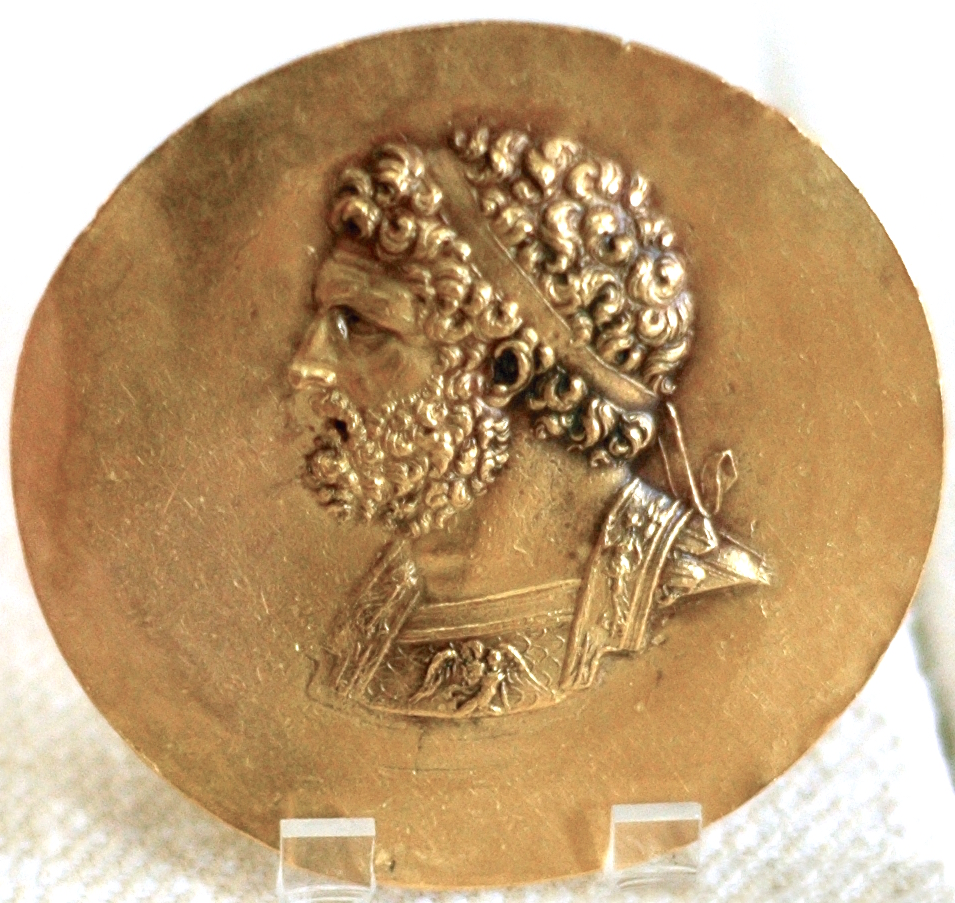
Niketerion (victory medallion) bearing the effigy of king Philip II of Macedon, 3rd century AD, probably minted during the reign of Roman Emperor Alexander Severus

=== Fictional portrayals ===
- Fredric March portrayed Philip II of Macedon in the film Alexander the Great (1956).
- Val Kilmer portrayed Philip II of Macedon in Oliver Stone's 2004 biopic Alexander.
- Sunny Ghanshani portrayed Philip II of Macedon in Siddharth Kumar Tewary's series Porus.

=== Games ===
- Hegemony Gold: Wars of Ancient Greece is a PC strategy game that follows the campaigns of Philip II in Greece
- Philip II appears in the Battle of Chaeronea in Rome: Total War: Alexander
- Philip II appears as a card in the Macedonian civilization deck that is played once then goes into history in Imperium: Classics
- Philip II appears in the Ancient Greece tutorial missions of Old World.

=== Dedications ===
- Philip II is depicted in the seal of Veria municipality in Greece.
- Filippos Veria, one of the most successful handball teams of Greece, bears the name of Philip II. He is also depicted in the team's emblem.
- Philip II is depicted in the emblem of the 2nd Support Brigade of the Hellenic Army, stationed in Kozani.
- Filippeio Park and Tourist Centre at Giannitsa, Greece.

Philip II of Macedon Argead dynasty Born: 382 BC Died: 336 BC
Preceded by Perdiccas III	King of Macedon; 359–336 BC	Succeeded by Alexander III the Great
