= Amyntas III of Macedon =

King of Macedonia from 393/2 to 370 BC

Amyntas III
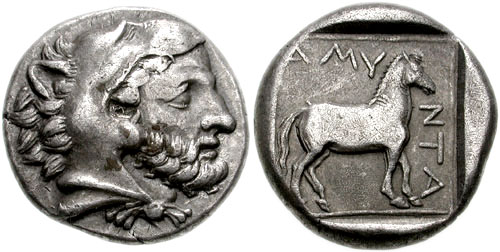
- silver stater of Amyntas III

King of Macedonia
- First reign: 393/2 – 388/7
- Predecessor: Pausanias
- Successor: Argaeus II
- Second reign: 387/6 – 370
- Predecessor: Argaeus II
- Successor: Alexander II
- Died: 370 BC
- Wives: Eurydice I; Gygaea
- Issue: Alexander II; Perdiccas III; Philip II; Eurynoe (wife of Ptolemy of Aloros); Archelaus; Arrhidaeus; Menelaus; Iphicrates (adopted)
- Father: Arrhidaeus, son of Amyntas
- Religion: Ancient Greek religion

Amyntas III (Ancient Greek: Ἀμύντας) was king of the ancient Greek kingdom of Macedonia from 393/2 to 388/7 BC and again from 387/6 to 370 BC. He was a member of the Argead dynasty through his father Arrhidaeus, a son of Amyntas, one of the sons of Alexander I. His most famous son is Philip II, father of Alexander the Great.

== Family ==
Polygamy was used by Macedonian kings both before and after Amyntas to secure marriage alliances and produce enough heirs to offset losses from intra-dynastic conflict. Consequently, Amyntas took two wives: Eurydice and Gygaea. He first married Eurydice, daughter of Sirras and maternal granddaughter of the Lynkestian king Arrhabaeus, probably in a Macedonian effort to strengthen the alliance with both the Illyrians and Lynkestians or to detach the Lynkestians from their historical alliance with the Illyrians, after the Macedonian defeat by Illyrians or an Illyrian-Lynkestian invasion in 393 BC. Through Eurydice, Amyntas had three sons, all of whom became kings of Macedonia one after the other, and a daughter: Alexander II, Perdiccas III, Philip II, and Eurynoe.

The Roman historian Justin relates several, possibly apocryphal, stories about Eurydice and Eurynoe. He claims that Eurynoe prevented her mother and her lover (unnamed, but likely Ptolemy of Aloros) from assassinating Amyntas late in his reign by revealing the plan to her father. However, Eurynoe is not referred to by name in any other source and, moreover, is unlikely to have known the details of this supposedly secret plot. According to Justin, Amyntas spared Eurydice because they shared children, but that she would later help murder Alexander and Perdiccas in order to place Ptolemy on the throne. Alexander was in fact killed by friends of Ptolemy at a festival in 368 BC, but the extent to which Eurydice knew of or participated in this plot is opaque. Perdiccas, on the other hand, assassinated Ptolemy in 365 BC only to be killed in battle by the Illyrians in 359 BC.

Amyntas most likely married Gygaea soon after marrying Eurydice, because Gygaea's children made no attempt to claim the throne before the 350s BC, implying that they were younger than Eurydice's children. Additionally, both Diodorus and Justin call Alexander II the eldest son of Amyntas. Through Gygaea, Amyntas had three more sons: Archelaus, Arrhidaeus, and Menelaus. Unlike Eurydice's children, none of Gygaea's sons ascended to the throne and were all killed by their half-brother Philip II.

Amyntas also adopted the Athenian general Iphicrates around 386 BC in recognition of his military services and marital ties with the Thracian king, Cotys I.

== Lineage and accession ==
Amyntas became king at a troubled time for Macedonia and the Argead dynasty. The unexpected death of his great-grandfather King Alexander I in 454 BC triggered a dynastic crisis between his five sons: Perdiccas II, Menelaus, Philip, Alcetas, and Amyntas' grandfather, Amyntas. Perdiccas would eventually emerge victorious, extinguishing the line of Philip. The elder Amyntas evidently retired to his lands at some point in the conflict and took no part in the exercise of power. Archelaus, Perdiccas' son, ascended to the throne around 413 BC and allegedly murdered Alcetas and his son, thus eliminating that family branch as well. However, Archelaus would himself be killed, possibly murdered, in 400 or 399 BC by his lover Craterus. His death prompted another succession crisis, resulting in five kings ruling in less than seven years, with nearly all ending violently. As Diodorus tells us, the younger Amyntas seized the throne at this point in 393/2 BC after assassinating the previous king Pausanias. Following his accession, Macedonia experienced no major internal political problems for the entirety of Amyntas' reign.

== King of Macedon ==
Shortly after he became king in 393 or 392, he was driven out by the Illyrians, but in the following year, with the aid of the Thessalians, he recovered his kingdom. Medius, head of the house of the Aleuadae of Larissa, is believed to have provided aid to Amyntas in recovering his throne. The mutual relationship between the Argeadae and the Aleuadae dates to the time of Archelaus.

To shore up his country against the threat of the Illyrians, Amyntas established an alliance with the Chalcidian League led by Olynthus. In exchange for this support, Amyntas granted them rights to Macedonian timber, which was sent back to Athens to help fortify their fleet. With money flowing into Olynthus from these exports, their power grew. In response, Amyntas sought additional allies. He established connections with Kotys, chief of the Odrysians. Kotys had already married his daughter to the Athenian general Iphicrates. Prevented from marrying into Kotys' family, Amyntas soon adopted Iphicrates as his son.

After the King's Peace of 387 BC, Sparta was anxious to re-establish its presence in northern Greece. In 385 BC, Bardylis and his Illyrians attacked Epirus instigated and aided by Dionysius I of Syracuse, in an attempt to restore the Molossian king Alcetas I of Epirus to the throne. When Amyntas sought Spartan aid against the growing threat of Olynthus, the Spartans eagerly responded. That Olynthus was backed by Athens and Thebes, rivals to Sparta for the control of Greece, provided them with an additional incentive to break up this growing power in the north. Amyntas thus concluded a treaty with the Spartans, who assisted him in a war against Olynthus. First Spartan-Macedonian forces suffered two defeats but in 379 BC they managed to destroy Olynthus. He also entered into a league with Jason of Pherae, and assiduously cultivated the friendship of Athens. In 371 BC at a Panhellenic congress of the Lacedaemonian allies, he voted in support of the Athenians' claim and joined other Greeks in voting to help Athens to recover possession of Amphipolis.

With Olynthus defeated, Amyntas was now able to conclude a treaty with Athens and keep the timber revenues for himself. Amyntas shipped the timber to the house of the Athenian Timotheus, in Piraeus.

Amyntas died aged 50, leaving his throne to his eldest son, Alexander II.

== See also ==
- Treaties between Amyntas III and the Chalcidians
- Amyntaio

== Bibliography ==
- Carney, Elizabeth D. (2019). Eurydice and the Birth of Macedonian Power. Oxford University Press. ISBN 978-0-19-028054-3.
- Carney, Elizabeth D.; Müller, Sabine (2020). The Routledge Companion to Women and Monarchy in the Ancient Mediterranean World. Routledge. ISBN 9780429783982.
- Heckel, Waldemar; Heinrichs, Johannes; Müller, Sabine, eds. (2020). Lexicon of Argead Makedonia. Frank & Timme GmbH. ISBN 978-3732904051.
- King, Carol J. (2017). Ancient Macedonia. Routledge. ISBN 9780415827287.
- Müller, Sabine (2021). "Political Marriage in Antiquity". In Mohammed, Jowan A.; Jacob, Frank (eds.). Marriage Discourses: Historical and Literary Perspectives on Gender Inequality and Patriarchic Exploitation. Walter de Gruyter GmbH & Co KG. pp. 25–50. ISBN 9783110751451.

Amyntas III of Macedon Argead dynasty Born: ? Died: 370 BC
Preceded by Pausanias	King of Macedon; 393/2–388/7 BC	Succeeded by Argaeus II
Preceded by Argaeus II	King of Macedon; 387/6–370 BC	Succeeded by Alexander II
