= Menelaus (son of Amyntas III) =

4th-century BC Macedonian

- Born: ?
- Died: 348 BC
- House: Argaed
- Father: Amyntas III
- Mother: Gygaea
- Religion: Ancient Greek Religion

Menelaus (Ancient Greek: Μενέλαος, romanized: Menelaos) was the half-brother of Philip II, king of ancient Macedonia. He was the son of Amyntas III and Gygaea, Amyntas' second wife, and had two brothers, Archelaus and Arrhidaeus. Fearing rival claimants to the throne, Philip executed Archelaus in 359 BC, and later killed Menelaus and Arrhidaeus following a siege at Olynthus in 348 BC.

== See also ==
- List of ancient Macedonians
