= Argeus (pretender) =

- Known for: Greek General

Argeus (Greek: Ἀργαῖος, Argaios, Latin: Argaeus) was a Greek general who claimed the right to the throne of ancient Macedon during the rule of Philip II of Macedon.

Argeus was supported by Athens, which opposed Macedon, and used Athenian money to buy a mercenary army and take the port city of Methone. Argeus was ultimately not successful in opposing Philip, as Macedon was able to unite all of Greece by the time of Philip's death.
