= List of shortest-reigning monarchs =

A monarch is the leader of a monarchy, a position usually intended to last for life or until abdication or deposition. The reigns of some monarchs have been notably short. Many of these monarchs acceded to the throne as a result of being first in an order of succession, while other monarchs claimed the throne as a result of conflict. The authenticity of some monarchs has been disputed, especially those who reigned during conflict. Only monarchs with a completed reign lasting less than 3 months are listed here, while popes are mentioned in their own article.

== Historically attested ==
Portrait	Monarch	Reign	Length	Reason for short reign	Ref.
	Philip; Antipope	31 July 768	Less than a day	Philip's election was declared invalid when he was found guilty of simony. Having been stripped of the pontifical garments, he was then forced to return to his monastery.	
	Emperor Mo; Emperor of Jin	9 February 1234	Less than a day	Emperor Aizong abdicated in his favor while they were still besieged by the Mongols at Caizhou. Mo was subsequently killed while leading a charge in the streets of Caizhou.	
	Celestine II; Pope-elect	13/14 December 1124	Less than a day	Elected after the death of Pope Callixtus II. Celestine abdicated a couple of hours into his papacy due to factional violence breaking out during the investment ceremony	
	Min Shin Saw; King of Burma	1167	Less than a day	Succeeded after the death of his father Sithu I, who was smothered by his younger son Narathu. Min Shin Saw was assassinated that same night on his brother's order.	
	Vira Bahu I King of Polonnaruwa	1196	Less than a day	Succeeded after the death of his father Nissanka Malla and crowned at night. He was assassinated at dawn by the commander-in-chief Tavuru Senevirat.	
	Soththisena; King of Anuradhapura (Sinhala Kingdom)	434	Less than a day	Soththisena succeeded his father Mahanama as king and was succeeded by his stepsister, Chattagahaka Jantu. According to the Lesser Chronicle (Cūḷavaṃsa) of Sri Lanka, King Soththisena ascended the throne in the morning and was assassinated that evening in a palace conspiracy.	
	Khalid bin Barghash; Sultan of Zanzibar	25–27 August 1896	2 days	Succeeded after the death of his cousin, Hamad bin Thuwaini, who was likely poisoned by Khalid. Barghash was forced to flee during the Anglo-Zanzibar War, which only lasted less than an hour.	
	Dục Đức; Emperor of Vietnam	20–23 July 1883	3 days	Succeeded after the death of his uncle and adoptive father, Tự Đức. Dục Đức was deposed and imprisoned by his regents Nguyễn Văn, Tôn Thất and Tran Tien. He died of starvation three months later.	
	Xiaowen; King of Qin (China)	250 BC	3 days	Succeeded after the death of his father, King Zhaoxiang. It is speculated that he was poisoned by chancellor Lü Buwei.	
	Inayatullah Khan; King of Afghanistan	14–17 January 1929	3 days	Succeeded after the abdication and flight of his brother, Amanullah Khan, during the uprising of Habibullāh Kalakāni. Abdicated in favour of Kalakani after he captured Kabul	
	Dipendra; King of Nepal	1–4 June 2001	3 days	Proclaimed king after the murder of his father Birendra and most of his family in the Nepalese royal massacre, where he also shot himself and was left in a coma. Died of his self-inflicted gunshot wound after 3 days without regaining consciousness.	
	Lê Long Việt; Emperor of Vietnam	1005	3 days	Succeeded after the death of his father, Lê Đại Hành. Assassinated on orders of his brother Lê Long Đĩnh, who succeeded him.	
	Lê Quang Trị; Emperor of Vietnam	1516	3 days	Lê Quang Trị was murdered by a family member.	
	John II; King of Portugal (first reign)	11–15 November 1477	4 days	King of Portugal for a brief period following his father's retirement to a monastery. While John abdicated upon his father's return to the throne, he later became the monarch again in 1481 reigning until his death in 1495.	
	John I King of France and Navarre	15–19 November 1316	4 days	John was the Posthumous child of Louis X. His premature death as an infant brought the first issue of succession of the Capetian dynasty.	
	Mahinda VI; King of Polonnaruwa	1187	5 days	Took the throne after killing Vijayabahu II. He was killed within a week by Vijayabahu II's sub-king, Nissanka Malla.	
	Thong Lan I King of Ayutthaya, King of Thailand	1388–1389	7 days	Thong Lan I was deposed and executed by his successor, Ramesuan.	
	Zein Pun; King of Martaban	April–May 1330	7 days	Zein Pun was assassinated by Sanda Min Hla, widow of Saw Zein.	
	Zimri; King of Israel	885 BC or 876 BC	7 days	Committed suicide while under siege by Omri, who disputed the crown. Zimri's name later became a byword for "traitor".	
	Muhammad al-Badr; King of Yemen	19–26 September 1962	8 days	Proclaimed king upon the death of his father, Ahmad bin Yahya. After the monarchy was abolished, he led the pro-monarchist forces during the North Yemen Civil War until 1970.	
	Saad; Emir of Kuwait	15–24 January 2006	9 days	Saad was deposed by the National Assembly on the grounds of poor health.	
	Igor II; Grand Prince of Kiev	2–13 August 1146	11 days	Igor II was forced to abdicate and was replaced by Iziaslav II	
	Xuantong; Emperor of Great Qing (second reign)	1–12 July 1917	11 days	The title "Emperor of China" was briefly restored by monarchist general Zhang Xun before collapsing due to a lack of support. Xuantong (Puyi) had last been emperor in 1912, and later became Emperor of Manchukuo.	
	Louis II; King of Holland	1–13 July 1810	13 days	Abdication and flight of Louis I after being pressured by Napoleon. His kingdom was ultimately annexed into the French Empire by the latter.	
	Eleanor; Queen of Navarre	28 January – 12 February 1479	14 days	Eleanor had a brief reign as queen before she was murdered (allegedly) 2 weeks later by poisoning.	
	Ali Ahmad Khan; Emir of Afghanistan	17 January – 1 February 1929	15 days	Proclaimed Emir in Jalalabad in protest for Inayatullah Khan's abdication on Habibullah Kalakani. Later captured and ransomed to Kalakani, who had him executed.	
	Napoleon II; Emperor of the French (second reign)	22 June – 7 July 1815	16 days	Empire abolished, replaced by the Kingdom of France	
	Shang; Emperor of Tang	8–25 July 710	17 days	Shang was deposed after being installed by Empress Wei and her daughter Li Guo'er who wanted to use the young Shang as their puppet.	
	Anikanga; King of Polonnaruwa	1209	17 days	Anikanga was assassinated by General Vikkantacamunakka, who then surrendered control to former queen Lilavati	
	Gordian II; Roman Emperor	March–April 238	22 days	Father and son co-emperors proclaimed in rebellion against Maximinus Thrax in the so-called Year of the Six Emperors. Gordian I committed suicide upon learning of his son's death at the Battle of Carthage.	
	Gordian I Roman Emperor	March–April 238	22 days	Father and son co-emperors proclaimed in rebellion against Maximinus Thrax in the so-called Year of the Six Emperors. Gordian I committed suicide upon learning of his son's death at the Battle of Carthage.	
	Diadumenian; Roman Emperor	May – June 218	23 days	Diadumenian was captured while fleeing from the battle of Antioch and was executed in late June. His head was allegedly brought to Elagabalus.	
	Rǫgnvaldr Óláfsson; King of Mann and the Isles	6–30 May 1249	24 days	Assassinated by his cousin and successor, Haraldr Guðrøðarson.	
	Milan Obrenović II; Prince of Serbia	25 June – 8 July 1839	26 days	Milan Obrenović died of tuberculosis.	
	Nepotianus; Roman Emperor	3–30 June 350	27 days	Assassinated by his rival usurper Magnentius's general Marcellinus.	
	Liu He; Emperor of Han	74 BC	27 days	Liu was briefly installed by regent Huo Guang before he was removed by Guang due to inappropriate behavior.	
	Taichang; Emperor of Great Ming	28 August – 26 September 1620	29 days	Taichang died pre-maturely from an unknown cause. Historical speculation ranges from an unknown disease to intentional or unintentional poisoning.	
	Zhongzong; Emperor of Tang (first reign)	23 January – 26 February 684	34 days (1 month, 3 days)	Zhongzong was deposed by his mother, Empress Dowager Wu	
	Umberto II; King of Italy	9 May – 12 June 1946	34 days (1 month, 3 days)	Monarchy abolished after republican victory in the 1946 Italian institutional referendum.	
	Athittayawong I King of Ayutthaya, King of Thailand	1629	36 days (1 month, 5 days)	Deposed in a coup led by his successor, Prasat Thong.	
	Salomon III; Emperor of Ethiopia (Second reign)	16 June – 25 July 1799	39 days (1 month, 9 days)	Deposed by Dejazmach Gugsa and Dejazmach Alula, who were part of the army that defeated Salomon's supporters	
	Sweyn Forkbeard; King of England	25 December 1013 – 3 February 1014	40 days (1 month, 9 days)	Sweyn died shortly after he was declared king after conquering London. Some historians theorise that he was killed, whereas other sources say he died after falling off a horse.	
	Li Zicheng; Emperor of Great Shun	25 April – 4 June 1644	40 days (1 month, 10 days)	Abandoned Beijing after his defeat by the Manchus at the Battle of Shanhai Pass. He was killed under unclear circumstances around 1645, likely in battle.	
	Tirigan; King of Sumer	c. 2050 BC	40 days (Note: The length of the "month" or "months" (28 to 31 days) is unknown)	Sumer annexed by Utu-hengal of Uruk.	
	Umor; Khan of Bulgaria	766	40 days	Reason unclear, Umor either died or was possibly deposed by Toktu.	
	Xerxes II; Shah of Persia and Pharaoh of Egypt	424 BC	45 days (1 month, 15 days)	Assassinated by Sogdianus, his illegitimate half-brother and successor.	
	Yuan Zhao; Emperor of Wei	2 April – 17 May 528	45 days (1 month, 17 days)	Yuan was deposed and executed along with Empress Dowager Hu, who had proclaimed him Emperor. (Note: Traditional historians treat him ambiguously, and subsequent Northern Wei emperors never explicitly declared whether he was an emperor or not. He was not given an imperial posthumous name or temple name, but neither was his imperial status declared null.)	
	Antipater Etesias; King of Macedon	279 BC	45 days	Deposed by his successor, Sosthenes.	
	Ying Ziying; King of Qin	October–December 207 BC	46 days	Ying was assassinated along with other male members of his family by rebel leader, Xiang Yu.	
	Ferdinand VII; King of Spain (first reign)	19 March – 6 May 1808	48 days (1 month, 17 days)	While Ferdinand was proclaimed king in the aftermath of the Tumult of Aranjuez, he was forced to abdicate by Napoleon shortly afterward. (Note: Ferdinand's abdication was declared null by the Council of Castile on 11 August, recognizing him as king despite being imprisoned by the French at Château de Valençay. Napoleon recognized him on 11 December 1813, by the Treaty of Valençay, and he remained on the throne until his death in 1833.)	
	Saw E King of Martaban	April–June 1330	49 days	Assassinated by former queen consort, Sanda Min Hla.	
	Magnus the Strong; King of Denmark	15 April – 4 June 1134	50 days (1 month, 19 days)	Magnus was crowned as king of Denmark by Emperor Lothair III on 15 April 1134. He was later killed at the Battle of Fotevik.	
	Ningzong; Khagan and Emperor of Great Yuan	23 October – 14 December 1332	52 days (1 month, 22 days)	Died of natural causes.	
	Pedro IV; King of Portugal	10 March – 2 May 1826	53 days (1 month, 23 days)	Abdicated in favour of his daughter, Maria II, and returned to Brazil where he reigned as Pedro I until 1831.	
	Charles II; King of Hungary and Croatia	31 December 1385 – 24 February 1386	55 days (1 month, 24 days)	Assassinated by Mary's mother, Elizabeth of Bosnia.	
	Feodor II; Tsar of Russia	23 April – 20 June 1605	58 days (1 month, 28 days)	Assassinated by boyars supporting False Dmitry I.	
	Al-Mansur Abu Bakr; Sultan of Egypt and Syria	7 June – 5 August 1341	59 days (1 month, 29 days)	Deposed by his son-in-law Qawsun and executed.	
	Joachim Ernest; Duke of Anhalt	13 September – 12 November 1918	60 days (1 month, 30 days)	Empire abolished, replaced by the Weimar Republic.	
	Gyanendra; King of Nepal (first reign)	7 November 1950 – 7 January 1951	61 days (2 months)	Tribhuvan returned and resumed his rule after the Ranas agreed to his terms. Gyanendra would become the last king of Nepal five decades later, after the Nepalese royal massacre.	
	Ibrahim ibn al-Walid; Caliph of Islam	4 October – 4 December 744	61 days (2 months)	Abdicated in favour of Marwan II, who murdered him in 750.	
	Mamia I King of Imereti (third reign)	November 1713 – 5 January 1714	2 months	Died from causes unknown.	
	Meleager; King of Macedon	279 BC	2 months	Forced to abdicate by his troops.	
	Radu IX; Prince of Wallachia (second reign)	April – May 1611	2 months	Deposed by Radu X.	
	Didius Julianus; Roman Emperor	28 March – 1 June 193	65 days (2 months, 4 days)	Deposed and executed. Also subjected to Damnatio memoriae.	
	Frederick Charles; King of Finland and Karelia	9 October – 14 December 1918	66 days (2 months, 5 days)	Renounced the throne without entering the country, which later became a republic.	
	Staurakios; Eastern Roman Emperor	26 July – 2 October 811	68 days (2 months, 6 days)	Forced to abdicate by Michael I Rangabe.	
	Frederick Christian; Elector of Saxony	5 October – 17 December 1763	74 days (2 months, 12 days)	Frederick Christian died of smallpox.	
	Muhammad II; Caliph of Cordoba (second reign)	10 May – 23 July 1010	74 days (2 months, 13 days)	Muhammad II was assassinated and replaced by Hisham II.	
	Petronius Maximus; Western Roman Emperor	17 March – 31 May 455	75 days (2 months, 14 days)	Murdered by a mob while trying to flee Rome from the impending Vandal attack.	
	Alexios V Eastern Roman Emperor	27 January – 12 April 1204	76 days (2 months, 16 days)	Fled Constantinople during the Latin Sack of 1204. Later captured by Crusaders and executed.	
	Edward V King of England	9 April – 25 June 1483	77 days (2 months, 16 days)	Deposed and imprisoned by his uncle Richard III, who claimed he was illegitimate. He is presumed murdered in captivity.	
	Chūkyō; Emperor of Japan	13 May – 29 July 1221	78 days (2 months, 17 days)	Due to the Jōkyū War, the imperial court army was defeated by the Kamakura Shogunate army and he was deposed. Not officially recognized as Emperor until 1870 because of doubts raised by his short reign	
	Stephen II; Despot of Serbia	1 April – 20 June 1459	80 days (2 months, 19 days)	While Stephen lost the throne when Serbia was annexed by the Ottoman Empire, he later became King of Bosnia for two years.	
	Cuitláhuac; Great Speaker of the Triple Alliance	c. 29 June – September 1520	80 days (2 months, 19 days)	Died of smallpox.	
	Hongxian; Emperor of China	1 January – 22 March 1916	81 days (2 months, 21 days)	Empire abolished after the monarchical restoration proved unexpectedly unpopular. Continued as President of the Republic of China until his death on 6 June.	
	Pertinax; Roman Emperor	1 January – 28 March 193	86 days (2 months, 27 days)	Assassinated by his Praetorian Guards, who then auctioned off the throne to the highest bidder.	
	Berengaria; Queen of Castile	6 June – 31 August 1217	86 days (2 months, 25 days)	Abdicated in favour of her son, Ferdinand III.	
	Christian Frederick; King of Norway	17 May – 14 August 1814	89 days (2 months, 28 days)	Abdicated by the Convention of Moss and returned to Denmark, where he became king (as Christian VIII) in 1839. The Crown of Norway was assumed by his rival, Charles XIII of Sweden.	
	Shajar al-Durr; Sultan of Egypt (Note: Shajar al-Durr has often been referred to as a "Sultana", but there is in fact no feminine form of Sultan and she herself used the title "Sultan" on her coinage.)	2 May – 30 July 1250	89 days (2 months 28 days)	Abdicated in favour of Aybak, her second husband.	
	Philip I King of Castile	27 June – 25 September 1506	90 days (2 months, 29 days)	Philip either died of typhoid or from poisoning.	

== Disputed ==
Portrait	Monarch	Reign	Length	Short summary	Ref.
	Louis XIX; King of France	2 August 1830	About 20 minutes	Heir-apparent of Charles X, who was forced to abdicate during the July Revolution. His abdication and his father's were announced through the same document, which refers to him as dauphin only. He is said to have been king between his father's signature and his own, implying that he hesitated signing the document. Though this is almost entirely unattested	
	Luís II; King of Portugal	1 February 1908	About 20 minutes	Carlos I was murdered in the Lisbon Regicide; his heir-apparent Prince Luís Filipe was also fatally wounded in the attack. Because Luís Filipe survived his father by about 20 minutes, the Guinness Book of Records identifies him as the second-shortest reigning monarch. However, according to the Portuguese tradition, the new monarch must be proclaimed by the Cortes Gerais; thus, the reign of Luís Filipe is disputed and not officially recognised. His younger brother, Manuel, who survived the attack, became the new king following his acclamation in the Cortes.	
	Daughter of Xiaoming; Emperor of Northern Wei	1 April 528	Less than a day	Proclaimed "Emperor" as an infant by her grandmother, Empress Dowager Hu, who passed her off as male. Later that same day, Hu admitted she was actually female and proclaimed Yuan Zhao as emperor. Official historical records never listed her as a legitimate sovereign.	
	Michael II; Emperor of Russia	15 March 1917	Less than a day	Succeeded after the abdication of Nicholas II. Made his accession conditional on the decision of the Provisional Government, contrary to the wishes of Nicholas, who abdicated without informing either. Numerous questions surround the existence of any "reign", starting with the legality, or lack thereof, of Nicholas's abdication to his brother while bypassing his son Alexei.	
	Napoleon II; Emperor of the French	4–6 April 1814 (first reign)	2 days	His father Napoleon Bonaparte was declared deposed by the French senate on 4 April 1814, but his formal abdication was not proclaimed until two days later. On 6 April, Napoleon renounced all personal rights to the throne and also those of his descendants. The French Empire was subsequently replaced by the restored Kingdom of France under Louis XVIII.	
	Louis Philippe II; King of the French	24–26 February 1848	2 days	His grandfather Louis Philippe I abdicated on 24 February 1848, following the French Revolution of 1848. The Second Republic was proclaimed two days later. He was later recognized by monarchist loyalists as "Louis Philippe II" or "Philip VII".	
	Ioan Joldea; Prince of Moldavia	September 1552	2–8 days	Succeeded after the assassination of Stephen VI by his boyars after a failed invasion of Transylvania. His reign length is disputed.	
	Henry V King of France	2–9 August 1830	7 days	Abdications of Charles X and Louis XIX, his grandfather and uncle, during the July Revolution. Proclamation hijacked by regent Louis Philippe of Orleans who chose not to announce it as expected. The National Assembly then proclaimed Louis Philippe the King of the French, and Henry marched into exile.	
	Sigeric; King of the Visigoths	16–22 August 415	7 days	Assassination of Ataulf by a former retainer of Sigeric's slain brother, Sarus. Sigeric was in turn assassinated and replaced by Ataulf's relative Wallia. Some lists of kings exclude him for considering him a usurper.	
	Irina Godunova; Tsarina of Russia	17–26 January 1598	9 days	Proclaimed after the death of her husband and distant cousin Feodor I. Ruled for 9 days as nominal tsar. Abdicated in favour of her brother Boris Godunov. Her reign is sometimes counted as having ended on February 21, when her brother Boris was formally elected tsar by the Boyars.	
	Jane; Queen of England and Ireland	10–19 July 1553	9 days	Proclaimed at the Tower of London, per the will of her cousin Edward VI. Deposed and executed by Edward's sister, Mary I	
	Henry II; King of Haiti	8–18 October 1820	10 days	Suicide of his father, Henry I. Murdered before being formally proclaimed. The kingdom was subsequently annexed by the Republic of Haiti.	
	Bel-shimanni; King of Babylon	484 BC	c. 14 days (Note: Tablets at the time only gave historical details spanning 2 weeks)	Proclaimed king in Borsippa and Dilbat, in rebellion against the Achaemenid Empire. Succeeded by Shamash-eriba, either after giving up his claim voluntarily or being defeated by him	
	Ælfweard; King of Wessex	17 July – 2 August 924	16 days	Death of his father, Edward the Elder. Died. May have reigned in dispute with his elder brother Æthelstan, who succeeded him	
	Cem; Sultan of the Ottoman Empire	28 May – 20 June 1481	23 days	Proclaimed himself Sultan in Anatolia after the death of his father, Mehmed II. Fled to Mamluk Egypt after being defeated by his brother, Bayezid II.	
	Constantine I Emperor of Russia	1–25 December 1825	24 days	Proclaimed after the death of his brother, Alexander I. Refused to assume the throne because he had secretly renounced all rights in 1823 in order to marry Joanna Grudzińska. His younger brother became Nicholas I.	
	Zhao Fu; Emperor of Song	26 March 1129 – 20 April 1129	25 days	Ascended the throne after his father, Emperor Gaozong, was forced to abdicate amidst a mutiny. Forced to abdicate in favour of his father. He is not considered a legitimate emperor by most historians.	
	António; King of Portugal	23 July – 25 August 1580	33 days (1 month, 2 days)	Proclaimed after the death of his uncle Henry due to popular support. Forced to abdicate after being defeated by his cousin Philip I. Reigned in the Azores until 1583	
	Ciubăr Vodă; Prince of Moldavia	c. December 1448 – January 1449	2 months	A Croatian-Hungarian aristocrat sent by John Hunyadi to depose Roman II in favor of Peter III, but said to have reigned himself as Prince after Peter III fled. Alexander II became Prince in February 1449. Some historians believe he merely occupied the country on Hunyadi's behalf and did not actually claim the throne.	

== Unknown length ==
Portrait	Monarch	Reign	Length (assumed)	Notes	Ref.
	Crateuas; King of Macedon	399 BC	3 or 4 days	Succeeded Archelaus I as king; little is known about him. Some historians believe that Crateuas was one of several conspirators in Archelaus' death and that the claim that Crateuas held the throne after him is an embellishment.	
	Baeda Maryam III; Emperor of Ethiopia	April 1826	Few days	Placed on the throne by Dejazmach Haile Maryam, the governor of Semien, but was deposed by Ras Marye of Yejju a few days later, who restored Gigar to the throne.	
	Quintillus; Roman Emperor	270	≈27 days (Note: Sources give him a reign-length of 17 days, 20 days, 77 days and "a few months". The claim that he ruled for 17 days is probably a mistake.)	Death of his brother, Claudius Gothicus, later assassinated or committed suicide.	
	Alexios V Emperor of Trebizond	April 1460	<1 month	Death of his father, John IV of Trebizond. Deposed by his uncle David	
	Ptolemy XI; Pharaoh of Egypt	80 BC	<1 month	Installed as husband and co-ruler of Berenice III. Later murdered Berenice and was killed by a mob.	
	Praudha Raya; King of Sangama dynasty	1485	<1 month	Deposed by Saluva Narasimha Deva Raya	
	Antipope Victor IV; Pope	March–May 1138	≈1 month	Proclaimed after the death of Antipope Anacletus II. Through the influence of Bernard of Clairvaux, he was induced to make his submission to Pope Innocent II. Innocent initially restored him as cardinal of SS. Apostoli, but in the Second Lateran Council of April 1139, all former adherents of Anacletus II were condemned and deposed. He then retired to the priorate of S. Eusebio in Fontanella.	
	Reccared II; King of the Visigoths	February–March 612	≈1 month	Death of his father, Sisebut	
	Charles II; Duke of Parma (second reign)	April – 17 May 1849	≈1 month	Restored by Austrian troops after fleeing during the Revolutions of 1848. Abdicated in favour of his son, Charles III	
	Shallum; King of Israel	752–745 BC	1 month	Assassinated King Zechariah, later in turn assassinated and replaced by Menahem.	
	Nabu-suma-ukin II; King of Babylon	732 BC	1 month, 2 days	Deposed Nabu-nadin-zeri, later deposed by Nabu-mukin-zeri.	
	Khusrau Khan; Sultan of Delhi	10 July – 6 September 1320	59 days?	According to Amir Khusrau, Mubarak Shah was murdered on 9 July 1320 and Tughluq ascended the throne on 6 September 1320. This implies that Khusrau Khan held the throne for less than two months. However, 14th century chronicler Isami states that Khusrau Khan reigned for "two or three" months. Barani also suggests that Khusrau Khan ruled for more than two months, when he states that Fakhruddin Jauna fled from Delhi 2½ months after the Sultan's ascension.	
	Herennius Etruscus; Roman co-emperor	May–June 251	1–2 months	Made co-emperor by his father, Decius. Killed at the Battle of Abritus	
	Edgar II; King of the English	after 14 October 1066 – early December 1066	1–2 months	Elected by the Witenagemot after Harold II's death. Later submitted to William the Conqueror.	
	Ragibagh Khan; Khagan and Emperor of Great Yuan	October – 14 November 1328	1–2 months	Installed following the death of his father, Yesün Temür. Died after a civil war broke out, probably murdered by a rival claimant	
	Labashi-Marduk; King of Babylon	556 BC	1–3 months	Succeedd his father, Neriglissar. Assassinated by Belshazzar	
	Muawiya II; Caliph of Islam	683–684	<2 months	Death of his father, Yazid I. Later died of disease	
	David Tiberius; Eastern Roman emperor	September – 5 November 641	<2 months	Made co-emperor of his brother Heraclonas by their mother, Empress Martina. Deposed by supporters of Constans II	
	Amyntas II; King of Macedon	394/393 BC	<2 months	Death of his relative Aeropus II. Assassinated and succeeded by Aeropus II's son Pausanias	
	John IV; Prince of Moldavia	November–December 1577	<2 months	Deposed Peter IV. Deposed and executed after an Ottoman-Polish-Wallachian invasion restored Peter IV	
	Salim II; Sultan of Ndzuwani	February – 2 April 1891	<2 months	Succeeded his father Abdallah III	
	Sanphet VII; King of Ayutthaya, King of Thailand	1656	<2 months	Overthrowing Sanphet VI. Executed by Ramathibodi III the Great	
	Trịnh Cán; Lord of Tonkin	September–October 1782	≈2 months	Death of his father, Trịnh Sâm. Forced to abdicate on Trịnh Khải	
	Tupac Huallpa; Sapa Inca	Began c. 26 July 1533, ended 12–27 October 1533	c. 78–93 days	Installed as puppet Inca by the Spanish after the assassination of Atahualpa. Died of disease or poison	
	Peter VII; Prince of Moldavia	August – September/October 1592	<2–3 months	Deposed Alexander V. Deposed and mutilated by Aaron I, who then handed him to the Ottomans to be executed	
	Gebre Krestos; Emperor of Ethiopia	24 March – 8 June 1832	2–3 months (Note: Except for a short time during the first reign of Sahle Dengel)	Died, possibly poisoned	
	Florianus; Roman Emperor	July–September 276	<3 months	Assassinated by his own troops while campaigning against the rebel Probus	
	Maha Thammarachathirat III; King of Ayutthaya, King of Thailand	1758	<3 months	Asked to abdicate by his brother, Borommaracha III, and went into monkhood. During the Burmese–Siamese War (1759–1760), Maha Thammarachathirat III was recrowned as a de facto co-king (not viceroy), in which he was forced to abdicate after the fall of Ayutthaya. He spent his last 29 years of exile in Mandalay, Third Burmese Empire. Living concuerently alongside 2 more iteration of the Siamese (Thai) state: Thonburi Kingdom and Rattanakosin Kingdom.	
	Sinmu; King of Silla	839	<3 months (Note: Sinmu is recorded as having reigned for three lunar months, slightly shorter than solar ones.)	Died from disease	
	Alexander III; Prince of Moldavia	December 1540 – February 1541	<3 months	Deposed and later assassinated by Peter IV	
	Alexander V Prince of Moldavia	June–August 1592	<3 months	Deposed by Peter VII. In November he became the equally brief Prince of Wallachia, as Alexander III.	

== See also ==
- List of current reigning monarchs by length of reign
- List of longest-reigning monarchs
- List of shortest-reigning popes
- List of state leaders by age
- List of the oldest living state leaders
- List of youngest state leaders since 1900
- Pedro Lascuráin, the shortest-ruling President
- Serafín María de Sotto, Prime Minister of Spain for 27 hours in 1849
- Records of heads of state
- Saul Wahl, legendary King of Poland for one day
