= 297 BC =

297 BC in various calendars
- Gregorian calendar: 297 BC; CCXCVII BC
- Ab urbe condita: 457
- Ancient Egypt era: XXXIII dynasty, 27
- Pharaoh: Ptolemy I Soter, 27
- Ancient Greek Olympiad (summer): 120th Olympiad, year 4
- Assyrian calendar: 4454
- Balinese saka calendar: N/A
- Bengali calendar: −890 – −889
- Berber calendar: 654
- Buddhist calendar: 248
- Burmese calendar: −934
- Byzantine calendar: 5212–5213
- Chinese calendar: 癸亥年 (Water Pig); 2401 or 2194 — to — 甲子年 (Wood Rat); 2402 or 2195
- Coptic calendar: −580 – −579
- Discordian calendar: 870
- Ethiopian calendar: −304 – −303
- Hebrew calendar: 3464–3465
- Hindu calendars
- Vikram Samvat: −240 – −239
- Shaka Samvat: N/A
- Kali Yuga: 2804–2805
- Holocene calendar: 9704
- Iranian calendar: 918 BP – 917 BP
- Islamic calendar: 946 BH – 945 BH
- Javanese calendar: N/A
- Julian calendar: N/A
- Korean calendar: 2037
- Minguo calendar: 2208 before ROC 民前2208年
- Nanakshahi calendar: −1764
- Seleucid era: 15/16 AG
- Thai solar calendar: 246–247
- Tibetan calendar: ཆུ་མོ་ཕག་ལོ་ (female Water-Boar) −170 or −551 or −1323 — to — ཤིང་ཕོ་བྱི་བ་ལོ་ (male Wood-Rat) −169 or −550 or −1322

The year 297 BC was a year of the pre-Julian Roman calendar. At the time, it was known as the Year of the Consulship of Rullianus and Mus (or, less frequently, 457 Ab urbe condita). The denomination 297 BC for this year has been used since the early medieval period, when the Anno Domini calendar era became the prevalent method in Europe for naming years.

== Events ==
=== By place ===
==== Roman Republic ====
- Third Samnite War:

- The consul Publius Decius Mus intercepts and defeats a force of Apulians near Maleventum, who were intending to reinforce the main Samnite army.
- The consul Quintus Fabius Maximus Rullianus defeats an attempted ambush by the Samnite army in the Battle of Tifernum, killing 3400, capturing 830, and causing the army to flee. He then invades Samnium and storms the town of Cimetra.

==== Bithynia ====
- Zipoetes I assumes the title of basileus (king) in Bithynia.

==== Greece ====
- Following Cassander's death from illness, Philip IV, Cassander's eldest son, succeeds his father as King of Macedon, but soon after coming to the throne, he suffers from a wasting disease and dies. Antipater, the next son, rules jointly with his brother Alexander V.
- Demetrius Poliorcetes returns to Greece with the aim of becoming master of Macedonia. While Demetrius is in Greece, Lysimachus seizes his possessions in Asia Minor.
- Ptolemy decides to support Pyrrhus of Epirus and restores him to his kingdom. At first, Pyrrhus reigns with a kinsman, Neoptolemus II of Epirus (who is a son of Cleopatra of Macedonia and a nephew of Alexander the Great), but soon he has him assassinated.

==== India ====
- Chandragupta Maurya goes to Sravana Belagola, near Mysore, to live in the way of Jains.
- Bindusara, his son, ascends to the Pataliputra throne.

== Deaths ==
- King Cassander of Macedon, one of the diadochoi ("successors"), the Macedonian generals who have fought over the empire of Alexander the Great after his death (b. c. 358 BC)
- Chandragupta Maurya, Emperor of the Maurya Empire in India, r. 322–297 BC (approximate date)
