= Argaeus I of Macedon =

Argaeus I

King of Macedonia
- Reign: 7th century BC
- Predecessor: Perdiccas I
- Successor: Philip I
- Spouse: unknown
- Issue: Philip I
- Dynasty: Argead
- Father: Perdiccas I
- Mother: unknown
- Religion: Ancient Greek religion

Argaeus (Greek: Ἀργαῖος, romanized: Argaios; fl. c. 623 BC) was king (Note: While Greeks such as Demosthenes and Aristotle referred to them as such, there is no evidence that any Macedonian ruler prior to Alexander III used an official royal title (basileus).) of the ancient Greek kingdom of Macedon. He was a member of the Argead dynasty and son of Perdiccas I. By allowing thirty years for the span of an average generation from the beginning of Archelaus' reign in 413 BC, British historian Nicholas Hammond estimated that Argaeus ruled around 623 BC.

According to Herodotus and Thucydides, Argaeus was the second king of Macedonia. However, a much later tradition records Caranus as the founder of Macedonia and therefore Argaeus as the fifth king. This unhistorical assertion is almost universally rejected by modern scholarship as propaganda invented at the Argead court during the reign of Philip II.

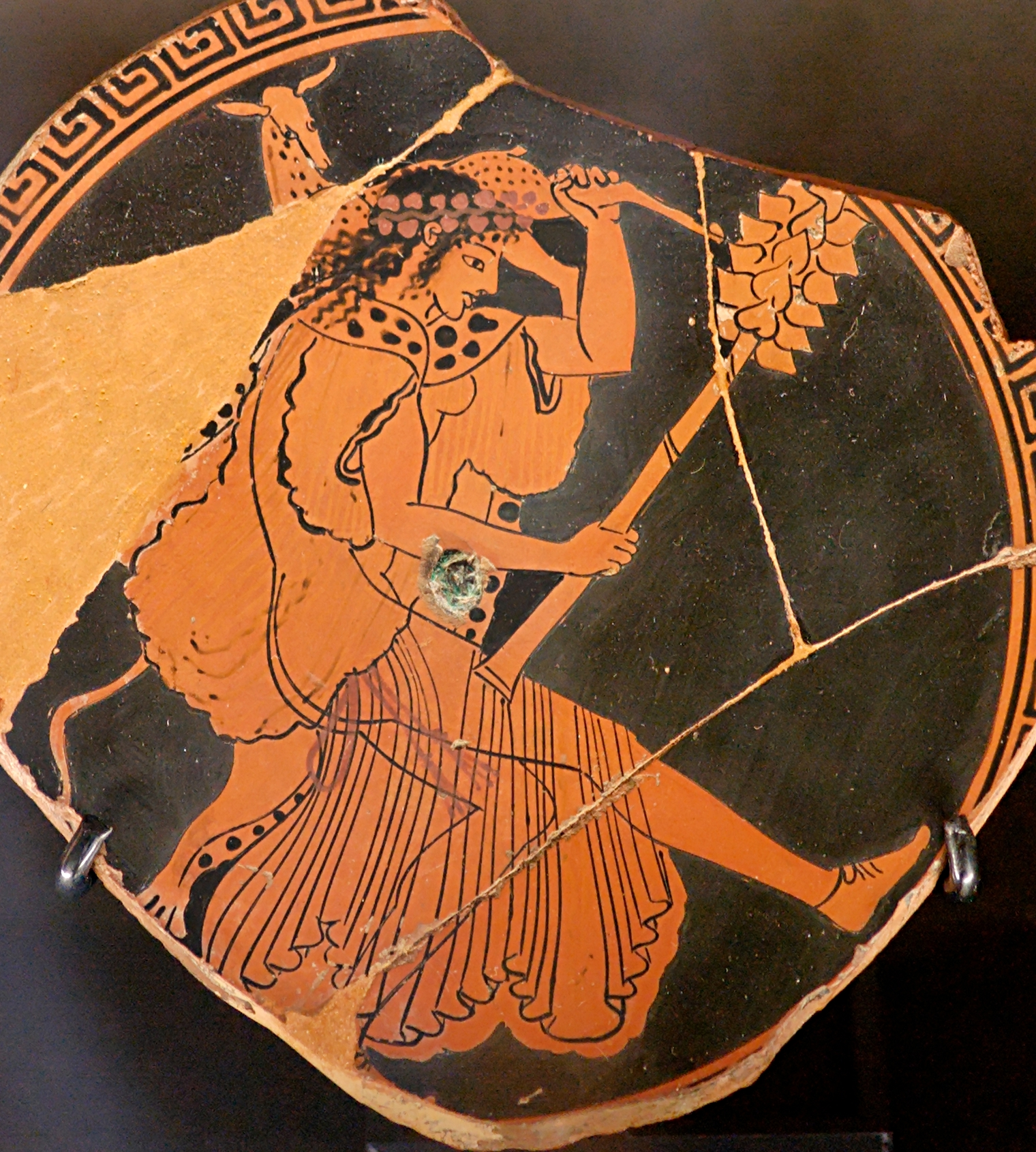
According to Polyaenus' story, Argaeus founded the Dionysus cult with Maenads (depicted here on a vase fragment from 480 BC).

According to the 2nd-century AD Greek writer Polyaenus, Argaeus tricked the Illyrian king of the Taulantii, Galaurus, by dressing men as women with wreaths and thyrsi (staffs), closely related to the cult of Dionysus. After the victory, Argaeus founded a temple dedicated to Pseudanor (Fake-man).

Argaeus I of Macedon Argead dynasty
Regnal titles
Preceded by Perdiccas I	King of Macedon c. 623 BC	Succeeded by Philip I
