= Thessalonike =

Thessalonike (Θεσσαλονίκη) may refer to:

- Thessalonike of Macedon, a daughter of king Philip II of Macedon
- Thessaloniki, a Greek city named after Thessalonike of Macedon

== See also ==
- Thessaloniki (disambiguation)
