= Alcetas of Macedon =

6th-century BC Macedonian king

Alcetas

King of Macedonia
- Reign: 6th century BC
- Predecessor: Aeropus I
- Successor: Amyntas I
- Spouse: unknown
- Issue: Amyntas I
- Dynasty: Argead
- Father: Aeropus I
- Mother: unknown

Alcetas (Ancient Greek: Ἀλκέτας, romanized: Alkétas; fl. c. 533 BC) was king (Note: While Greeks such as Demosthenes and Aristotle referred to them as such, there is no evidence that any Macedonian ruler prior to Alexander III used an official royal title (basileus).) of the ancient Greek kingdom of Macedon. He was a member of the Argead dynasty and son of Aeropus I. By allowing thirty years for the span of an average generation from the beginning of Archelaus' reign in 413 BC, British historian Nicholas Hammond estimated that Alcetas ruled around 533 BC.

According to Herodotus and Thucydides, Alcetas was the fifth king of Macedonia. However, a much later tradition records Caranus as the founder of Macedonia and therefore Alcetas as the eighth king. This unhistorical assertion is almost universally rejected by moderns scholarship as propaganda invented at the Argead court during the reign of Philip II.

By all accounts, Alcetas was a calm and stable ruler, who sought to preserve his kingdom through peaceful means. Unlike his predecessors, he apparently did not engage in unnecessary warfare in order to extend the boundaries of his kingdom. His wife is unknown, but he was the father of Amyntas I.

== See also ==
- List of ancient Macedonians

== Notes and references ==
=== Citations ===
Alcetas of Macedon Argead dynasty
Preceded by Aeropus I	King of Macedon c. 533 BC	Succeeded by Amyntas I
