= Philip of Macedon (disambiguation) =

Philip of Macedon most commonly refers to Philip II of Macedon (382–336 BC), king of Macedonia (359–336 BC) and hegemon of the Hellenic League (338–336 BC), father of Alexander the Great.

Philip was also the name of several other monarchs of Macedon:

- Philip I of Macedon (ruled 640–602 BC)
- Philip III of Macedon (c. 359–317 BC), son of Philip II, ruled 323-317 BC
- Philip IV of Macedon (died 297 BC)
- Philip V of Macedon (238 BC - 179 BC), ruled 221–179 BC

== See also ==
- Philip of Macedon (play)
- Alexander of Macedon (disambiguation)
