= Tyrimmas of Macedon =

Tyrimmas

King of Macedonia
- Reign: unknown
- Predecessor: Coenus
- Successor: Perdiccas I
- Issue: Perdiccas I
- Dynasty: Argead dynasty
- Father: Coenus
- Religion: Ancient Greek religion

Tyrimmas (Ancient Greek: Τυρίμμας) was according to Macedonian tradition an Argead king of the ancient Greek kingdom of Macedonia. He is not mentioned in the list of Argead kings given by Herodotus, but is first mentioned in the fourth century, when the Macedonian records of the Argead kings appear to have changed permanently. A fragment of the historian Satyrus records three kings before Perdiccas I, the founder of the Argead dynasty in Herodotus' list: Caranus, Coenus and Tyrimmas.
