= Aeropus I of Macedon =

Aeropus I

King of Macedonia
- Reign: 6th century BC
- Predecessor: Philip I
- Successor: Alcetas
- Spouse: unknown
- Issue: Alcetas
- Dynasty: Argead
- Father: Philip I
- Mother: unknown
- Religion: Ancient Greek religion

Aeropus I (Ancient Greek: Ἀέροπος, romanized: Aéropos; fl. c. 563 BC) was king (Note: While Greeks such as Demosthenes and Aristotle referred to them as such, there is no evidence that any Macedonian ruler prior to Alexander III used an official royal title (basileus).) of the ancient Greek kingdom of Macedon. He was a member of the Argead dynasty and son of Philip I. By allowing thirty years for the span of an average generation from the beginning of Archelaus' reign in 413 BC, British historian Nicholas Hammond estimated that Aeropus ruled around 563 BC.

== Reign ==
At the start of Aeropus's reign, the Thracians and Illyrians were ravaging the country of Macedon, and had achieved a number of successful victories over the Macedonians. Eventually, despairing about their inability to achieve a victory over their enemies, and believing that they could only be victorious if they fought in the presence of their king, the army carried the infant Aeropus with them into battle (according to legend). His presence stiffened the resistance of the soldiers, and they forced the Thracians and Illyrians to flee, eventually retreating entirely from Macedon.

According to Plutarch, Aeropus constructed tables and lamp-stands in his spare time.

No further details of his reign are recorded.

His wife's name is unknown.

Aeropus I of Macedon Argead dynasty
Regnal titles
Preceded by Philip I	King of Macedon c. 563 BC	Succeeded by Alcetas
