= Lebaea =

Lebaea or Lebaie (Ancient Greek: Λεβαίη) was an ancient city in Upper Macedonia, and the residence of the early Macedonian kings, mentioned by Herodotus. The historian points out that, according to tradition, three brothers Gauanes, Aeropus and Perdiccas, all descended Temenus, had from fled from Argos to the Illyrians and then to Lebaea, where they served the king. The king asked them to leave his territory, believing in an omen that something great would happen to Perdiccas. The boys went to another part of Macedonia, near the garden of Midas, above which mount Bermio stands. There they made their abode and slowly formed their own kingdom. The youngest of the brothers, Perdiccas, was considered the ancestor of the Macedonian kings of later times.

Its site is unlocated.
