= Alexander V =

Alexander V may refer to:

- Alexander V of Macedon (died 294 BCE)
- Antipope Alexander V (c. 1339–1410)
- Alexander V of Imereti (c. 1703/4–1752)
