= Pleistarchus (son of Antipater) =

4th century BC Macedonian nobleman and general, son of Antipater, brother of Cassander I

Satrap of Cilicia
- Reign: 301-298 BC
- Predecessor: Philoxenus
- Successor: Demetrius Poliorcetes

Satrap of Caria
- Reign: 301-294 BC
- Predecessor: Asander
- Successor: Eupolemus (son of Simalus)
- Died: 294 BC (presumed)
- Father: Antipater

Pleistarchus (Ancient Greek: Πλείσταρχος; fl. 313 – 287 BC) was son of Antipater and brother of Cassander, king of Macedonia. As well as an Antipatrid general, he served as an independent dynast of Cilicia and then Caria in later life.

== Wars of the Diadochi ==
He is first mentioned in the year 313 BC when Cassander himself was recalled to the defense of Macedonia and entrusted the command of Chalcis to his brother. However, it was soon seized from him by Ptolemaeus, Antigonus's nephew and the commander of his forces in western Asia Minor, when he invaded Greece.

Pausanias mentions him as having been defeated by the Athenians in an action in which he commanded the cavalry and auxiliaries of Cassander, probably in 304 BC, late in the Four Years' War. A gate with a trophy on top was built next to the Stoa Poikile at the northwest corner of the Athenian Agora, presumably at the site of a pivotal battle following Pleistarchus's breach of the Dipylon. Pleistarchus, now likely the commander of the Peloponnese suffered another defeat the following year when Demetrius expelled Antipatrid forces from Argos.

In 302 BC, when the general coalition was formed against Antigonus, Pleistarchus was sent forward by his brother, with an army of 12,000 infantry and 500 cavalry, to join Lysimachus in Asia. As the Hellespont and the entrance of the Euxine was occupied by Demetrius, he endeavored to transport his troops from Odessus directly to Heraclea, but lost by far the greater part on the passage, some having been captured by the enemy's ships, while others perished in a storm, in which Pleistarchus himself narrowly escaped shipwreck. Notwithstanding this misfortune, he seems to have rendered efficient service to the confederates, for which he was rewarded after the battle of Ipsus (301 BC) by obtaining the province of Cilicia, as an independent government. However, he would only maintain control for three years before being expelled Demetrius, almost without opposition.

== Dynast of Caria ==
Afterwards, he is recorded in inscriptions as the ruler of Caria. It was long hypothesized by historians like Beloch that Pleistarchus had been granted a realm spanning the southern coast of Asia Minor, comprising Caria, Lycia, Pamphylia, and Cilicia; however, it appears more likely that he was initially only given Cilicia and was compensated with Caria (a prize long sought after by the Antipatrids) after his prior province had been seized. An inscription in Sinuri places the duration of his rule in Caria as being at least seven years, but whether this period should be counted from the battle of Ipsus or his expulsion from Cilicia is debated. Alternative theories suggest that Pleistarchus was awarded with both Caria and Cilicia in 301 BC but that his deputy Eupolemus Simalou administered Caria during the first few years of its nominal rule by Pleistarchus until Cilicia was lost. There is no evidence of his rule outside northern Caria, and he was in competition with Ptolemaic interests to the south. His capital in Caria was Heraclea at Latmus, which was briefly renamed to Pleistarchea (Πλεισταρχεία). Both Heraclea/Pleistarchea and nearby Hyllarima were fortified by Pleistarchus in the 290s BC. An inscription from the sanctuary of Sinuri near Mylasa shows that Pleistarchus' power was respected at least this far south. Although Pleistarchus's cause of death is not known, Billows postulates that it could have been from consumption like his brother Cassander and nephew Philip. However, Billows and Gregory do not discount the possibility that Eupolemus Simalou simply killed and deposed Pleistarchus to establish himself as the ruler of (a considerably shrunken) Caria.

It is perhaps to him that the medical writer, Diocles of Carystus, addressed his work, which is cited more than once by Athenaeus, as τα προς Πλεισταρχον Υγιεινα.
