= Perdiccas I of Macedon =

Perdiccas I
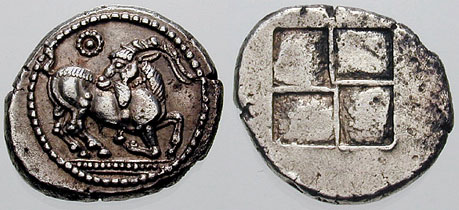
- Tetradrachm of Aigai – old Macedonian royal capital Aigai, founded by Perdikkas I

King of Macedonia
- Reign: 7th century BC
- Predecessor: Disputed: Caranus (legendary); Tyrimmas (legendary)
- Successor: Argaeus I
- Spouse: unknown
- Issue: Argaeus I
- Dynasty: Argead
- Father: Disputed: Caranus (legendary); Tyrimmas (legendary)
- Mother: unknown

Perdiccas I (Greek: Περδίκκας, romanized: Perdíkkas; fl. c. 650 BC) was king (Note: While Greeks such as Demosthenes and Aristotle referred to them as such, there is no evidence that any Macedonian ruler prior to Alexander III used an official royal title (basileus).) of the ancient Greek kingdom of Macedon. By allowing thirty years for the span of an average generation from the beginning of Archelaus' reign in 413 BC, British historian Nicholas Hammond estimated that Perdiccas ruled around 653 BC, however, Eusebius writes that Perdiccas reigned for 48 years.

There are two separate historical traditions describing the foundation of the Argead dynasty. The earlier, documented by Herodotus and Thucydides in the fifth century BC, records Perdiccas as the first king of Macedonia. The later tradition first emerged sometime at the beginning of the fourth century BC and claimed that Caranus, rather than Perdiccas, was the founder. Aside from Satyrus, who adds Coenus and Tyrimmas to the list, Marsyas of Pella, Theopompos, and Justin all agree that Caranus was Perdiccas' father. Furthermore, Plutarch claimed in his biography of Alexander the Great that all of his sources agreed that Caranus was the founder. This unhistorical assertion is rejected by modern scholarship as Argead court propaganda, possibly intended to diminish the significance of the name 'Perdiccas' in rival family branches following Amyntas III's accession.

Herodotus stated:

"From Argos fled to the country of the Illyrians three brothers of the descendants of Temenus, Gauanes, Aeropus, and Perdiccas; and passing over Illyria from the mountains they came into the upper parts of Macedonia to the city of Lebaea." "Now that these descendants of Perdiccas are Greeks, as they themselves say, I myself chance to know and will prove it in the later part of my history."

Perdiccas I of Macedon Argead dynasty
Regnal titles
Preceded by possibly Tyrimmas	King of Macedon c. 653 BC	Succeeded by Argaeus I
