= Alexander of Macedon (disambiguation) =

Alexander of Macedon most commonly refers to Alexander III of Macedon (356–323 BC), most commonly known as Alexander the Great, king of Macedonia and hegemon of the Hellenic league from 336 to 323 BC, who conquered the Achaemenid empire.

Alexander was also the name of several other monarchs of Macedon:

- Alexander I of Macedon (died 454 BC), ruled from 498 to 454 BC
- Alexander II of Macedon (died 368 BC), ruled from 370 to 368 BC
- Alexander IV of Macedon (323–310 BC), son of Alexander the Great, ruled as a child-king from birth to death
- Alexander V of Macedon (died 294 BC), ruled with his brother Antipater from c. 297–294 BC

== See also ==
- Philip of Macedon (disambiguation)
