= List of kings of Macedonia =

King of Macedonia
- The Vergina Sun, as depicted on the larnax of Philip II

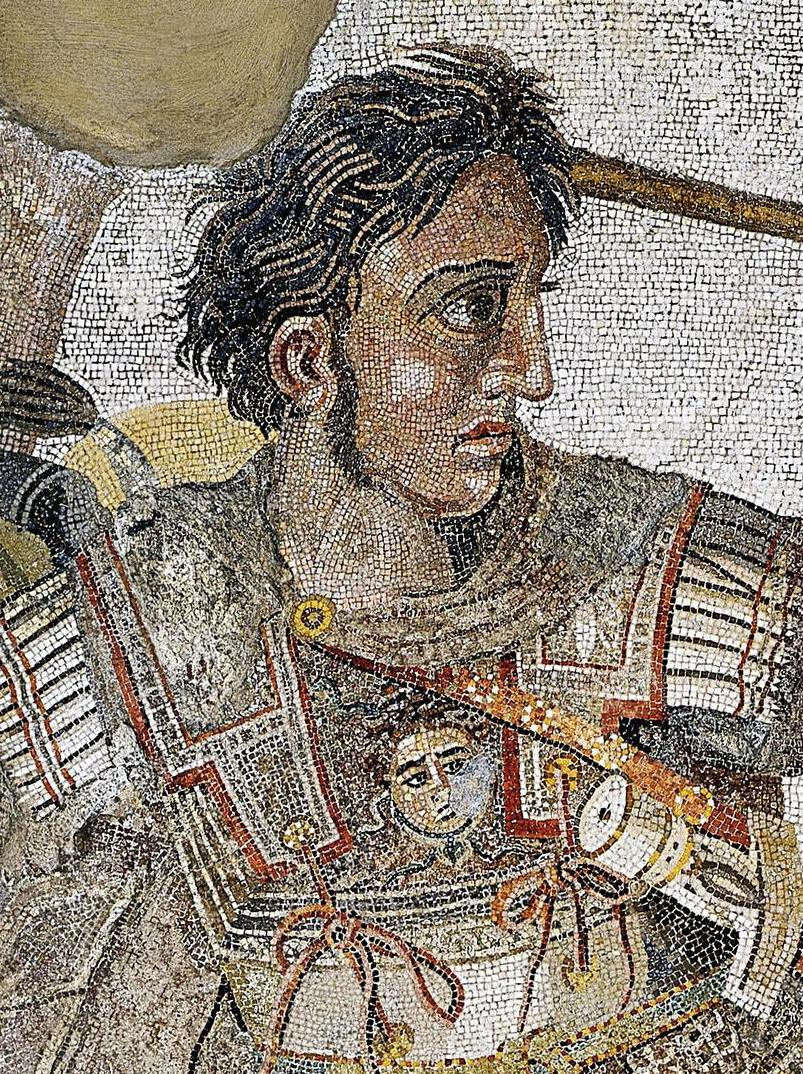
- Painting of Alexander III the Great

Details
- Style: King of the Macedonians, Basileus
- First monarch: Perdiccas I
- Last monarch: Perseus
- Formed: c. 650 BC
- Abolished: 168 BC
- Residences: Aegae, Pella, and Demetrias

Macedonia, also called Macedon, was ruled continuously by kings from its inception around the middle of the seventh century BC until its conquest by the Roman Republic in 168 BC. Kingship in Macedonia, its earliest attested political institution, was hereditary, exclusively male, and characterized by dynastic politics.

Information regarding the origins of the Argeads, Macedonia's founding dynasty, is very scarce and often contradictory. The Argeads themselves claimed descent from the royal house of Argos, the Temenids, but this story is viewed with skepticism by some scholars as a fifth century BC fiction invented by the Argead court "to 'prove' Greek lineage". It is more likely that the Argeads first surfaced either as part of a tribe living near Mount Bermion who, possibly under the authority of Perdiccas, subjugated neighboring lands, or, according to Herodotus, were of a Doric race that originally resided in Pindus. During their reign, Macedonia would not only come to dominate Greece, but also emerge as one of the most powerful states in the ancient world with the conquest of the Persian Empire under Alexander the Great. However, Alexander's untimely death in 323 BC triggered a series of civil wars and regents for his young son Alexander IV, ultimately leading to the Argead dynasty's demise.

Cassander, the ostensible regent of Macedonia, murdered Alexander IV in 310 and installed the Antipatrids as the ruling house. His dynasty was short-lived, however, as his death in 297 triggered a civil war between his sons that further destabilized the kingdom. The following decades saw a rapid and violent succession of Diadochi from various dynasties, each vying for the Macedonian throne. This chaos continued until the death of Pyrrhus in 272 and the accession of the Antigonids under Antigonus II Gonatas.

Following decades of continuous conflict, the Antigonids saw the temporary renewal of the kingdom's fortunes, but were destroyed by Rome after Perseus' defeat at the battle of Pydna in 168 BC.

== Argead dynasty (c. 650 BC – 310 BC) ==
=== Legendary ===
There are two separate historical traditions relating the foundation of Macedonia and the Argead dynasty. The earlier, documented by Herodotus and Thucydides in the fifth century BC, records Perdiccas as the first king of Macedonia. The later tradition first emerged around the beginning of the fourth century BC and claimed that Caranus, rather than Perdiccas, was the founder. Aside from Satyrus, who adds Coenus and Tyrimmas to the list, Marsyas of Pella, Theopompos, and Justin all agree that Caranus was Perdiccas' father. Furthermore, Plutarch claimed in his biography of Alexander the Great that all of his sources agreed that Caranus was the founder. This unhistorical assertion, like the Argive connection, is rejected by modern scholarship as court propaganda, possibly intended to diminish the significance of the name 'Perdiccas' in rival family branches following Amyntas III accession.

Name	Reign	Succession	Life details
Caranus	Unknown	According to various ancient authors, either the son, brother, or relative of the Argive king Pheidon	
Coenus	Unknown	Son of Caranus	
Tyrimmas	Unknown	Son of Coenus	

=== Historical ===
Herodotus mentions the names of the five kings preceding Amyntas I, but provides no other information. Consequently, the reign dates and activities of the early Argead kings can only be guessed at. By allowing thirty years for the span of an average generation and counting backwards from the beginning of Archelaus' reign in 413 BC, British historian Nicholas Hammond estimated that the dynasty began around 650 BC. Amyntas I and his son Alexander I are the earliest kings for which we have any reliable historical information, and even then, only in the context of their relationships with Achaemenid Persia and Greeks.

Name	Reign	Succession	Life details
Perdiccas I	fl. c. 650 BC	According to various ancient authors, either the son of Caranus or Tyrimmas	Conquered Macedonia after settling near Mount Bermion.
Argaeus I	fl. c. 623	Son of Perdiccas I	Possibly established the cult of Dionysus in Macedonia.
Philip I	fl. c. 593	Son of Argaeus I	
Aeropus I	fl. c. 563	Son of Philip I	
Alcetas	fl. c. 533	Son of Aeropus I	
Amyntas I	c. 512 – 498/7	Son of Alcetas	Unknown – 498/7 First king for which there is reliable historical information; vassal of Darius I from 512.
Alexander I "Philhellene"	498/7 – 454 (43 years)	Son of Amyntas I	Unknown – 454 Intensified Macedon's relationship with Greek city states following Persian withdrawal in 479.
Perdiccas II	454 – 413 (41 years)	Son of Alexander I	Unknown – 413 Fought both for and against Athens during the Peloponnesian War; died probably of natural causes.
Archelaus	413 – 399 (14 years)	Son of Perdiccas II	Unknown – 399 Moved center of kingdom from Aegae to Pella; either murdered in a personal revenge plot or killed in a hunting accident by his lover Craterus.
Orestes	399 – 398/7 (3 years)	Son of Archelaus	Unknown – 398/7 Minority reign until removal in 398/7; possibly murdered by Aeropus II, his guardian, but facts are uncertain.
Aeropus II (Note: There is some confusion among the sources about the name of Orestes' successor: Eusebias and Syncellus mention an 'Archelaos' while Diodorus records an 'Aeropus'. However, it is likely that Aeropus simply adopted the name 'Archelaos' after Orestes' death.)	398/7 – 395/4 (3 years)	Son of Perdiccas II	Unknown – 395/4 Died of illness
Amyntas II "the Little"	394/3 (Several months)	Son of Menelaus, Alexander I's second son	Unknown – 394/3 Probably ruled at the same time as Pausanias; sources for reign are few, but likely murdered by the ruler of Elimiotis, Derdas.
Pausanias	394/3 (Several months)	Son of Aeropus II	Unknown – 394/3 Probably ruled at the same time as Amyntas II; sources for reign are few, but likely murdered by Amyntas III.
(1st reign) Amyntas III	393 (Less than a year)	Great grandson of Alexander I through his third son, Amyntas	Unknown – 369 Held kingdom together despite multiple Illyrian invasions; died of natural causes.
Argaeus II	393? (disputed)	Pretender to the throne installed by the Illyrians under Bardylis; possibly the son of Archelaus (Note: Theopompus of Chios wrote that "they call both Argaios and Pausanias Archelaos [sic]" which historian Nicholas Hammond emends to read, "they call both Argaeus and Pausanias the son of Archelaus." However, not all historians are in agreement and the claim remains largely unverifiable.)	Unknown Expelled by Amyntas III with Thesallian help.
(2nd reign) Amyntas III	393 – 369 (18 years)	Great grandson of Alexander I through his third son, Amyntas	Unknown – 369 Held kingdom together despite multiple Illyrian invasions; died of natural causes.
Alexander II	369 – 368 (2 years)	Eldest son of Amyntas III	c. 390 – 368 (aged 22) Assassinated by Ptolemy of Aloros following Theban military intervention under Pelopidas.
Ptolemy of Aloros	368 – 365 (3 years; disputed) (Note: Modern scholars disagree on whether Ptolemy should be considered a king in his own right or simply regent for Perdiccas III. The confusion stems from contradictory comments by our primary sources: Plutarch refers to Ptolemy as a regent in Pelopidas, yet Diodorus refers to him as king. As noted by Hammond, all coins from this period bear the name Perdiccas rather than Ptolemy, suggesting a non-royal status for the latter. Moreover, the demotic 'Alorus' implies that Ptolemy was not an Argead and therefore would be ineligible for the throne.)	Possibly the son of Amyntas II; acted as regent for Perdiccas III	c. 418– 365 (aged 53) Assassinated by Perdiccas III.
Perdiccas III	365 – 360/59 (6 years)	Son of Amyntas III	c. 383 – 360/59 (aged 24) Killed in battle against the Illyrians.
Amyntas IV	360/59 (disputed)	Son of Perdiccas III	c. 365 – 335 (aged 30) Never ruled in his own right; later murdered by Alexander III.
Philip II	360/59 – 336 (23 years)	Son of Amyntas III	382 – 336 (aged 47) Would come to dominate Ancient Greece through a massive expansion of Macedonian power; assassinated by Pausanias of Orestis.
Alexander III "the Great"	336 – 323 (13 years)	Son of Philip II	356 – 10/11 June 323 (aged 33) Conquered the entirety of the Persian Empire; died of illness at Babylon.
Philip III Arrhidaeus	323 – 317 (6 years)	Son of Philip II; co-ruler with Alexander IV	c. 358 – 317 (aged 41) Owing to his diminished mental capacity, Philip never actively ruled and instead went through a series of regents including Perdiccas (323 – 320), Peithon and Arridhaeus (320), Antipater (320 – 319), and Polyperchon (319 – 317); executed by the mother of Alexander III, Olympias.
Alexander IV	323 – 310 (13 years)	Son of Alexander III; co-ruler with Philip III	323 – 310 (aged 13) Due to his age, Alexander never actively ruled and instead went through a series of regents including Perdiccas (323 – 320), Peithon and Arridhaeus (320), Antipater (320 – 319), and Polyperchon (319 – 317). Alexander III's mother, Olympias, guarded him until her execution in 316; murdered by Cassander.

== Antipatrid dynasty (310–294 BC) ==
Name	Reign	Succession	Life details
Cassander	310 – 297 (13 years)	Son of the regent Antipater and son-in-law of Philip II	c. 356 – 297 (aged 59) Died of illness (possibly tuberculosis)
Philip IV	297 (4 months)	Son of Cassander	Unknown – 297 Died of illness (possibly tuberculosis)
Antipater I	297 – 294 (3 years)	Son of Cassander; co-ruler with Alexander until Antipater murdered their mother, Thessalonike, for favoring his brother.	Unknown – 294 Killed by his father-in-law, Lysimachus.
Alexander V	297 – 294 (3 years)	Son of Cassander; co-ruler with his brother Antipater.	Unknown – 294 Assassinated by Demetrius I.

== Dynastic conflicts (294–272 BC) ==
Name	Reign	Succession	Life details
Demetrius I "Poliorcetes"	294 – 288 (6 years)	Proclaimed king by army in Larissa following Alexander V's assassination; son of the diadochos Antigonus and brother-in-law of Cassander through Phila	January/February 336 – 282 (aged 54) Surrendered to Seleucus I Nicator in 285, died of illness in captivity a few years later.
(1st reign) Pyrrhus of Epirus	288 – 284 (3-4 years)	Usurped throne following joint invasion of Macedonia with Lysimachus and Ptolemy; non-dynastic.	c. 319 – 272 (aged 46) Killed at the Battle of Argos.
Lysimachus	287 – 281 (6 years)	Ruled only the eastern half of the kingdom until 284 when he seized the whole of Macedonia; non-dynastic.	c. 360 – 281 (aged 79) Killed at the Battle of Corupedium.
Ptolemy "Ceraunus"	281 – 279 (2 years)	Assassinated Seleucus before he entered Macedon and was proclaimed king at Lysimachia; son of Ptolemy I Soter.	c. 319/18 – February 279 (aged approx. 40) Captured and beheaded by an invading Celtic army.
Meleager	279 (2 months)	Elected king following the death of Ceraunus; son of Ptolemy I Soter.	Unknown Deposed by Macedonians after accusations of inadequacy
Antipater II "Etesias"	279 (45 days)	Elected king following Meleager's removal; nephew of Cassander	Unknown Removed by Sosthenes for failing to lead the army.
Sosthenes	279 – 277 (2 years)	Strategos and de facto king of Macedon, but refused royal title despite election; non-dynastic	Unknown – 277 Died of natural causes.
(1st reign) Antigonus II "Gonatas" (Note: Antigonus' regnal number stems from his grandfather, Antigonus I Monophthalmus)	277 – 274 (274 - 272 only the coastal areas) (3 years)	Seized Macedonia by the middle of 276 in the chaos (Note: It is unclear who ruled Macedonia in the short time between Sosthenes death and Antigonus's accession. Porphyry mentions a Ptolemy and an Arrhidaeus having some kind of authority.) that followed the death of Sosthenes; son of Demetrius I and son-in-law of Seleucus I Nicator	319 – 239 (aged 80) Died of natural causes.
(2nd reign) Pyrrhus of Epirus	274 – 272 (disputed) (Note: Pyrrhus's reign, brief and unpopular, is omitted from Porphyry's list of Macedonian kings and is mentioned only in Syncellus's Chronography)	Retook Thessaly and the interior of Macedonia, but remained unable to oust Antigonus from the coastal areas	c. 319 – 272 (aged 46) Killed at the Battle of Argos.

== Antigonid dynasty (272–168 BC) ==
Name	Reign	Succession	Life details
(2nd reign) Antigonus II "Gonatas"	272 – 239 (33 years)	Son of Demetrius I and son-in-law of Seleucus I Nicator	319 – 239 (aged 80) Died of natural causes.
Demetrius II	239 – 229 (10 years)	Son of Antigonus II	c. 275/4 – 229 (aged approx. 45) Defeated in battle by the Dardanians, died shortly after in unknown circumstances.
Antigonus III "Doson"	229 – 221 (8 years)	Chosen by "leading Macedonians" to rule first as regent for Philip and, then later, as king; grandson of Demetrius I and cousin of Demetrius II	c. 263 – 221 (aged approx. 42) Suffering from tuberculosis, Antigonus burst a blood vessel following a battle with the Illyrians and died some months later.
Philip V	221 – 179 (42 years)	Son of Demetrius II	239 – 179 (aged 60) Died suddenly of natural causes.
Perseus I	179 – 168 (11 years)	Son of Philip V	212 – 166 (aged 46) Surrendered to Aemilius Paullus following defeat at Pydna and imprisoned at Alba Fucens for the remainder of his life.

== Non-dynastic rebel kings (150–93 BC) ==
Name	Reign	Succession	Life details
Andriscus (Philip VI)	150 – 148 (2 years)	Claimed to be a son of Perseus	Unknown – 146 Executed during the triumph of Caecilius Metellus; last king to rule in Macedonia.
Pseudo-Alexander (Alexander VI)	147	Claimed to be a son of Perseus	Unknown Fled to Dardania following military defeat whereafter his fate is unknown.
Pseudo-Philip/Pseudo-Perseus (Philip VII/Perseus II)	143	Rose against the Romans with 16,000 men; claimed to be the son of Perseus	Unknown – 143 Defeated, and presumably executed, by Lucius Tremellius Scrofa.
Pseudo-Philip (Philip VIII)	111 or 112	Tried to become king during a Skordi incursion into Macedonian territory	Unknown – 111 or 112 Defeated and likely killed by Marcus Livius Drusus who was awarded a triumph for his victory
Euephenes	93	Styled himself as king, but apprehended before uprising began; claimed Antigonid Heritage	Unknown

== Family tree ==
Simplified family tree of the Argead, Antipatrid and Antigonid dynasties (omitting non-dynastic kings)
Individuals with disputed heritage or rule are italicized.

Perdiccas I c. 650 BC
Argaeus I c. 623
Philip I c. 593
Aeropus I c. 563
Alcetas c. 533
Amyntas I 512–498/7
Alexander I 498/7–454
Perdiccas II; 454–413	Menelaus	Amyntas
Archelaus; 413–399	Aeropus II; 398/7–395/4	Amyntas II; 394/3	Arrhidaeus
Orestes; 399–398/7	Argaeus II; 393 BC?	Pausanias; 394/3	Ptolemy; 368–365	Amyntas III; 393–369
Alexander II; 369–368	Perdiccas III; 365–360/59	Philip II; 360/59–336	Antipater	Antigonus I
Amyntas IV; 360/59	Philip III; 323–317	Alexander III; 336–323	Thessalonike	Cassander; 310–297	Philip	Phila	Demetrius I 294–288	Ptolemais
Alexander IV; 323–310	Philip IV; 297	Antipater I 297–294	Alexander V 297–294	Antipater II; 279	Antigonus II; 277–239	Demetrius
Demetrius II; 239–229	Antigonus III; 229–221
Philip V 221–179
Perseus; 179–168

== See also ==
- List of ancient Macedonians
