= Antipatrid dynasty =

Dorian Greek dynasty

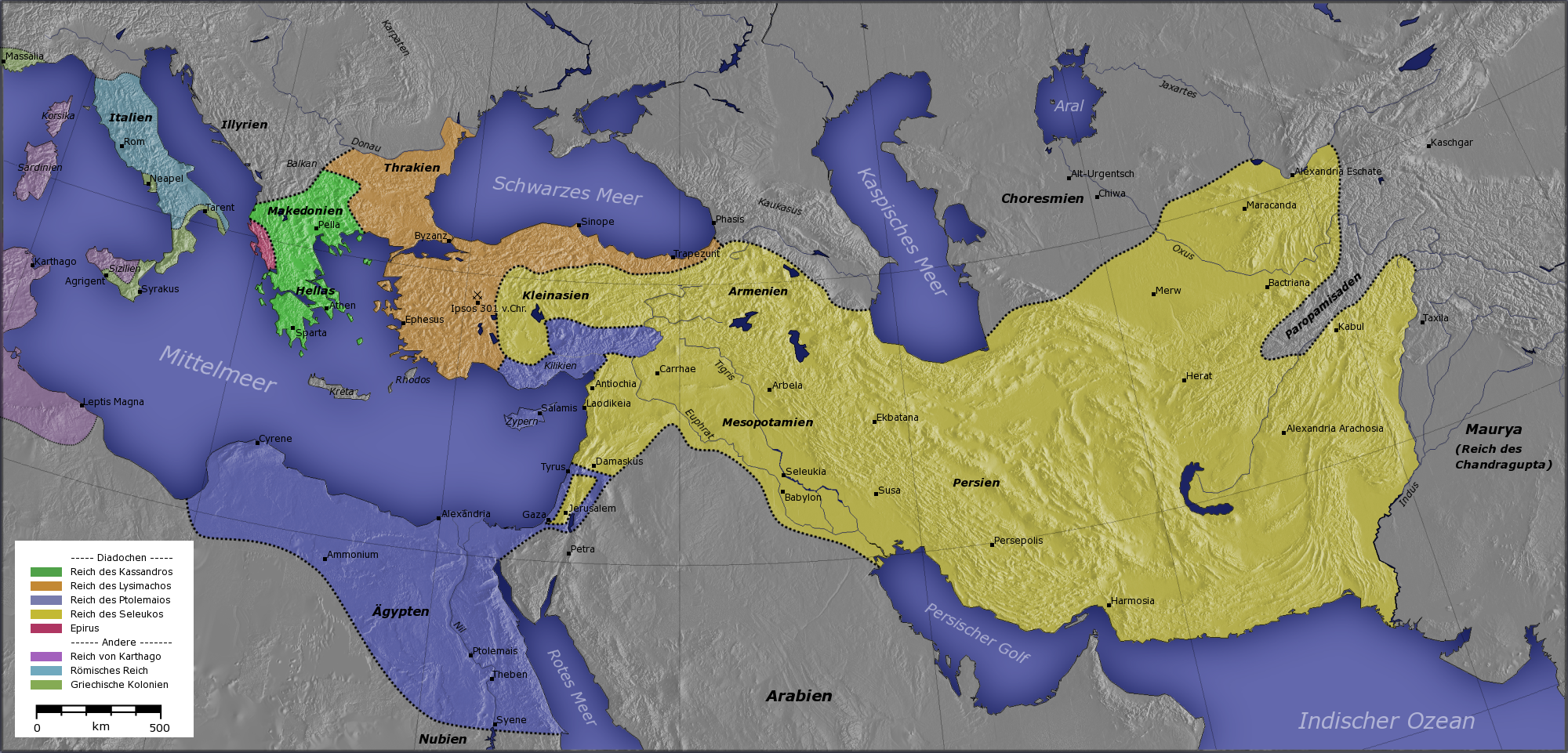
Kingdom of Cassander Other Diadochi: Kingdom of Seleucus Kingdom of Lysimachus Kingdom of Ptolemy Epirus Other: Carthage Rome Greek colonies

The Antipatrid dynasty (/ænˈtɪpətrɪd/; Ancient Greek: Ἀντιπατρίδαι) was a Dorian Greek dynasty of the ancient Greek kingdom of Macedon founded by Cassander, the son of Antipater, who declared himself King of Macedon in 305 BC. This dynasty did not last long; in 294 BC it was swiftly overthrown by the Antigonid dynasty.

== Members ==
Members of the Antipatrid dynasty:

- Antipater, regent, not king
- Cassander (305–297 BC)
- Philip IV of Macedon (297 BC)
- Alexander V of Macedon (297–294 BC)
- Antipater I (296–294 BC)
- Antipater II Etesias (279 BC)

== Family tree of Antipatrids ==
Iollas
Cassander nobleman	Antipater regent of the Empire
Antigone ∞ Magas of Macedon nobleman	Phila ∞ 1.Balakros; 2.Craterus; 3.Demetrius I of Macedon	Eurydice ∞ Ptolemy I of Egypt	Iollas cup-bearer	Cassander king of Macedon; 305-297 BC ∞ Thessalonike	Pleistarchus general	Nicaea ∞ 1.Perdiccas regent of the Empire; 2.Lysimachus of Thrace	Perilaus	Philip general
Berenice I ∞ 1.Philip nobleman 2.Ptolemy I of Egypt	Lysandra	Alexander V king of Macedon; 297-294 BC	Philip IV king of Macedon; 297 BC	Antipater I king of Macedon; 297-294 BC	Eurydice

== See also ==
- History of Macedonia (ancient kingdom)
- Government of Macedonia (ancient kingdom)
