= Marsyas of Philippi =

3rd-century BC Greek historian

Marsyas of Philippi (Ancient Greek: Μαρσύας, Κριτοφήμου, Φιλιππεύς; 3rd century BC) was a Macedonian Greek historian and the son of Critophemus. He was often called Marsyas the Younger (Ancient Greek: Μαρσύας ὁ Νεώτερος) to distinguish him from Marsyas of Pella, with whom he has frequently been confounded. The earliest writers by whom he is cited are Pliny the Elder and Athenaeus. The latter tells us that he also served as a priest of Heracles. His works were Μακεδονικά On Macedonia (6 books), Αρχαιολογία Archaeology (On Attica?) (12 books) and Μυθικά On Myths (7 books).
