= Perdiccas II of Macedon =

5th-century BC king of Macedon

Perdiccas II
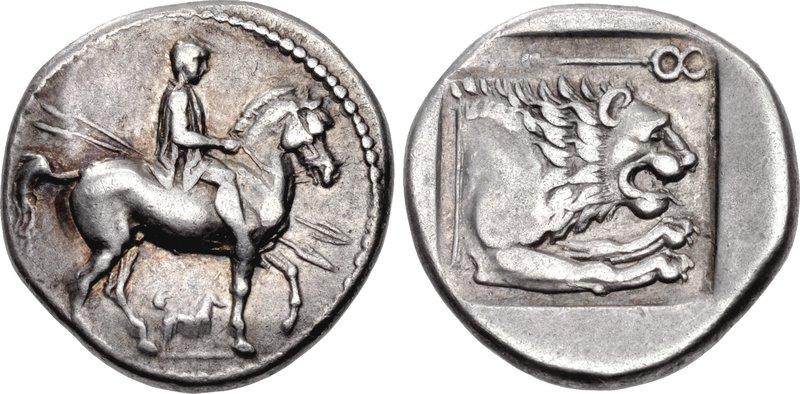
- Silver tetrobol of Perdiccas II; the lion on the reverse alludes to the Nemean lion killed by Herakles, the mythical ancestor of the king.

King of Macedonia
- Reign: 454–413 BC
- Predecessor: Alexander I
- Successor: Archelaus I
- Born: Unknown
- Died: 413 BC
- Wives: Simache; Cleopatra
- Issue: Archelaus I Aeropus II unknown son
- Dynasty: Argead
- Father: Alexander I
- Mother: unknown
- Religion: Ancient Greek religion

Perdiccas II (Greek: Περδίκκας, romanized: Perdíkkas) was the king of Argead Macedon from 454 BC until his death in 413 BC. During the Peloponnesian War, he frequently switched sides between Sparta and Athens.

== Biography ==
=== Family ===
Perdiccas II was the oldest son of Alexander I. He had four brothers: Alcetas, Amyntas, Menelaus, and Philip. Menelaus was the father of the future king Amyntas II while Amyntas' grandson would be king Amyntas III. Around 429/428 BC, Perdiccas successfully negotiated an end to a Thracian invasion of Macedonia by arranging for his sister Stratonice to marry Seuthes, nephew of the Thracian king Sitalces.

During his reign, Perdiccas married at least two women: Simache and Cleopatra. The former, mother of Archelaus and Aeropus II, is accused by Plato, through his interlocutors in Gorgias, of having been a slave of Alcetas. It is doubtful, however, that Archelaus would have been treated as legitimate if his mother had been a slave and therefore Simache was most likely a member of the Macedonian elite (albeit nonroyal).

Cleopatra, possibly a Lyncestian or even Argead, bore one presently unnamed son to Perdiccas. According to Plato, Archelaus drowned this son in a well when he was seven years old because he was considered the legitimate heir. There is strong evidence to suggest that Cleopatra married Archelaus, her step-son, following the death of Perdiccas, but this has been disputed by historians like Nicholas Hammond.

=== Reign ===
Macedon (orange) during the Peloponnesian War around 431 BC, with Athens and the Delian League (yellow), Sparta and Peloponnesian League (red), independent states (blue), and the Persian Achaemenid Empire (purple)

The unexpected death of Alexander I in 454 precipitated a dynastic crisis In Macedonia. Perdiccas ascended to the throne as the oldest son, but at least two of his four brothers, Philip and Alcetas, obtained their own local realms (arkhai). He annexed Alcetas' territory at some unknown date, but Philip's control of the strategically important Axios Valley around Amphaxitis proved more difficult to overcome. In 433, Philip formed an alliance with King Derdas I of Elimiotis in Upper Macedonia and Athens, promising to defend each other and refrain from aiding Philip's enemies. Perdiccas responded by stirring up rebellion in a number of Athenian tribute cities, including Potidaea.

Athens responded with force, and sent 1000 hoplites and 30 ships to Macedonia where they captured Therma. They went on to besiege Pydna, where they were met by reinforcements of a further 2000 hoplites and 40 ships. However, as the Athenians were besieging Pydna, they received news that Corinth had sent a force of 1600 hoplites and 400 light troops to support Potidaea.

In order to combat this new threat, Athens made an alliance with Perdiccas, and proceeded to Potidaea. Perdiccas immediately broke the treaty and marched to Potidaea. While the Athenians were eventually victorious, the battle (along with the Battle of Sybota) directly led to the Peloponnesian War.

In autumn 431, Athens entered into an alliance with the Odyrisian king Sitalces following the diplomatic efforts of his Greek brother-in-law, Nymphodorus of Abdera. Nymphodorus then arranged a deal between Athens and Perdiccas in which Macedonia regained Therma in exchange for Perdiccas agreeing to march alongside them against the rebel Chalcidians. It was at this point that Athens finally abandoned Philip and he fled to Thrace with his son Amyntas.

However, Thucydides then reports that Sitalces invaded Macedonia in 429 with a large army and Amyntas in tow, apparently upset with Perdiccas for an unfulfilled (and thus far unknown) promise made in 431. Attacking 'Lower Macedonia from the top,' Sitalces marched through Mt. Cercine (now Mt. Ograzden) and entered Philip's former territory via Valandovo, supposedly with an army of 150,000 men. A number of cities in the region, with the notable exception of Europus, went over to the Thracians and the Macedonians were forced to retreat to their strongholds. That they were unprepared for the invasion is possibly a consequence of Perdiccas having earlier sent 1000 Macedonians to support the Spartan general Cnemus' invasion of pro-Athenian Acarnania. Macedonian resistance proved limited, and Sitalces freely ravaged Mygdonia, Crestonia, and Anthemus, save for an ineffective cavalry attack by Perdiccas' Orestian allies. Nevertheless, the invasion faltered for a number of reasons. Firstly, supplies began to run low as it was winter and a promised Athenian fleet never materialized. Although they were ostensibly allies, the Athenians were likely concerned about the prospect of a Thracian client on the Macedonian throne following the rapid advance of the ambitious Sitalces. Furthermore, Seuthes, an influential nephew and officer of Sitalces, successfully persuaded the king to return home after Perdiccas had secretly promised him a large dowry and the marriage of his sister Stratonice. Thucydides states that Sitalces left after ''a stay of thirty days in all, eight of which were spent in Chalcidice.''

After this, Perdiccas was allied to the Spartans and, in 424, helped the Spartan Brasidas to take Amphipolis from the Athenians, one of her most important colonies, mainly for its ready access to timber for her fleets. This was a severe blow to Athens, and would tie them to Macedonian timber for years to come, which strengthened Macedonia's bargaining power considerably. In return for this, the Spartans helped Perdiccas secure his borders, by leading an assault on King Arrhabaeus of Lyncestis, with the promise of support from the Illyrians (Battle of Lyncestis). However, the Illyrians switched sides and attacked Perdiccas and his Spartan allies. The poorly trained Macedonian troops fled, and so the Spartans also retreated and attacked the Macedonian baggage train in anger. This soured relations between Macedonia and the Peloponnese for years to come, and pushed Perdiccas closer to Athens, allying himself with them in 423.

By 417, Perdiccas had left the Athenians and joined the Spartan-Argive alliance. Just four years later, bowing to Athenian pressure, Perdiccas broke with the Peloponnese, and aided Athens in their attack on Amphipolis.

In 413/2 BC he died, leaving his son Archelaus as heir.

Perdiccas II Argead dynasty Born: ? Died: 413 BC
Royal titles
| Preceded by Alexander I | King of Macedon; 454–413 BC | Succeeded by Archelaus I |
