= Pseudanor =

Pseudanor (Greek: Ψευδάνωρ pseudo- + anēr "false man", metaphorically an "effeminate man") was a Macedonian epithet applied to Dionysus. Other Macedonian appellations to the god were Agrios (Ἄγριος) "wild" (as god of the countryside) and Erikryptos (Ἐρίκρυπτος) "completely hidden" (as the god hidden from the frenzied women roaming the countryside by the kourotrophos Kala Thea, the Beautiful Goddess, and raised as a girl: the transition to pseudanor).

All of the names of Dionysus above are attested in four inscriptions from Beroea c. 248–264 AD. However, the history of Pseudanor was certainly much older. The Macedonian historian Polyaenus relates an aetiological myth:

In the reign of Argaeus, the Illyrian Taulantii under Galaurus invaded Macedonia. Argaeus, whose force was very small, directed the Macedonian virgins (parthenoi), as the enemy advanced, to show themselves from mount Ereboea (Ἐρέβοια). They accordingly did so; and in a numerous body they poured down, covered by wreaths, and brandishing their thyrsi instead of spears. Galaurus, intimidated by the numbers of those, whom instead of women he supposed to be men, sounded a retreat; whereupon the Taulantii, throwing away their weapons, and whatever else might retard their escape, abandoned themselves to a precipitate flight. Argaeus, having thus obtained a victory without the hazard of a battle, erected a temple to Dionysus Pseudanor; and ordered the priestesses of the god, who were before called Klοdones by the Macedonians, to ever afterwards be distinguished by the title of Mimallones.

The Klodones and the Mimallones are also mentioned by Plutarch in his biography of Alexander the Great, one of his Parallel Lives. The aetiological myth in Polyaenus may have originated or been adapted in the Aitia ('Causes") of Callimachus, but Polyaenus mentions both important points: Dionysus's ambivalent sexuality and the masculine qualities of the Maenads. This female-male-female transvestite ritual (it was only natural that Dionysus presided over it) of the Klodones-Mimallones probably marked the transition of the Macedonian girls to adulthood.

== See also ==
- Proitides and Minyades

== Bibliography ==
- Dillon, Matthew, Girls and Women in Classical Greek Religion
- Hatzopoulos, Miltiades B., "Macedonian Cults" (as "Cultes et rites de passage en Macédoine"), Athens & Paris, 1994
  - Devine, A. M., "Review: Macedonian Cults", The Classical Review, New Series, Vol. 46, No. 2 (1996), pp. 279–281, Cambridge University Press on behalf of The Classical Association
- Macurdy, Grace Harriet, "Klodones, Mimallones and Dionysus Pseudanor", The Classical Review, Vol. 27, No. 6 (Sep., 1913), pp. 191–192, Cambridge University Press on behalf of The Classical Association
- Padilla, Mark William (editor), "Rites of Passage in Ancient Greece: Literature, Religion, Society", Bucknell University Press, 1999. ISBN 0-8387-5418-X
- Polyaenus Stratagems Book 4.1Greek Text
