= Philip I of Macedon =

Philip I

King of Macedonia
- Reign: 6th century BC
- Predecessor: Argaeus I
- Successor: Aeropus I
- Spouse: unknown
- Issue: Aeropus I
- Dynasty: Argead
- Father: Argaeus I
- Mother: unknown
- Religion: Ancient Greek religion

Philip I (Greek: Φίλιππος, romanized: Philippos; fl. c. 593 BC) was king (Note: While Greeks such as Demosthenes and Aristotle referred to them as such, there is no evidence that any Macedonian ruler prior to Alexander III used an official royal title (basileus).) of the ancient Greek kingdom of Macedon. He was a member of the Argead dynasty and son of Argaeus I. By allowing thirty years for the span of an average generation from the beginning of Archelaus' reign in 413 BC, British historian Nicholas Hammond estimated that Philip ruled around 593 BC.

As king, Philip was noted to be both wise and courageous. He resisted successive invasions by the Illyrians, but was eventually killed in battle against them, leaving the crown to his infant son, Aeropus I. Philip's wife is unknown.

Very little is known of Philip I due to his early status as a king of Macedon. However, his family line would eventually lead to Alexander the Great.

Philip I of Macedon Argead dynasty
Regnal titles
| Preceded by Argaeus I | King of Macedon c. 593 BC | Succeeded by Aeropus I |
