= Orestes of Macedon =

King of Macedonia from 400/399 to 398/397 BC

Orestes

King of Macedonia
- Reign: 400/399–398/7 BC
- Predecessor: Archelaus
- Successor: Aeropus II
- Born: Unknown
- Died: 398/7 BC
- Dynasty: Argead
- Father: Archelaus
- Mother: Cleopatra (Note: Possibly the same woman who married Perdiccas II, Orestes' grandfather.)
- Religion: Ancient Greek religion

Orestes (Ancient Greek: Ὀρέστης, romanized: Oréstēs), was king of the ancient Greek kingdom of Macedon and son of Archelaus I He reigned from 400/399 to 398/7 BC, when his guardian (epitropos) (Note: Generally meaning a guardian or trustee in Ancient Greek, rather than regent. This word appears frequently in the works of Diodorous, Aristotle, and other Greek writers.) and uncle, Aeropus II, killed or deposed him. Aeropus thereafter reigned alone until his death in 394/3 BC.

Orestes Argead dynasty Born: ? Died: 398/7 BC
Royal titles
Preceded by Archelaus	King of Macedon; 400/399–398/7 BC	Succeeded by Aeropus II
