= Thessaloniki (disambiguation) =

Thessaloniki, Thessalonica or Salonica is Greece's second largest city and the capital of Greek Macedonia.

The terms may also refer to:

== Modern ==
- Thessaloniki (regional unit) in Greek Macedonia
  - Thessaloniki (municipality)
  - Thessaloniki metropolitan area
  - Thessaloniki A
  - Thessaloniki B

== Early Modern ==
- Vilayet of Salonica, a province of the Ottoman Empire

== Medieval ==
- Thessalonica (theme), a province of the Byzantine Empire
- Kingdom of Thessalonica, a Crusader state
- Empire of Thessalonica, a Byzantine successor state

== Ancient ==
- Thessalonike of Macedon, the sister of Alexander the Great

== See also ==
- Thessaloniki airport
- Port of Thessaloniki
- Macedonia (region)
- Northern Greece
- Macedonia (Greece)
- Central Macedonia
