= Arrhidaeus of Macedonia =

3rd-century BC Macedonian monarch

Arrhidaeus (Greek: Ἀρριδαῖoς) was a ruler or ancient noble of some sort who is mentioned as a "king of Macedonia" by the writer and philosopher Porphyry.

In the line of kings of Macedonia it is unclear who exactly ruled between the death of Sosthenes of Macedon and the accession of Antigonus II Gonatas in the early 3rd century BCE, around 279 to 277, a time sometimes described as "the anarchy". The note of Porphyry's, indicating that an "Arrhidaeus" and a "Ptolemy" held some power, is among the only information about who ruled Macedonia at this time. Those two could be the sons of Lysimachus: Alexander (also known as Arrhideus) and Ptolemy Epigonos who held some power in Macedonia during that period according to Diodorus Siculus.
