= Antipater I of Macedon =

King of Macedon from 297 BC until 294 BC, jointly with his brother Alexander V of Macedon

Antipater I of Macedon (Greek: Ἀντίπατρος), was the son of Cassander and Thessalonike of Macedon, who was a half-sister of Alexander the Great. He was king of Macedon from 297 BC until 294 BC, jointly with his brother Alexander V. Eventually, he murdered his mother and ousted his brother from the throne. Alexander turned to Pyrrhus and Demetrius I Poliorcetes for help, and Demetrius I overthrew Antipater and then had Alexander murdered. Antipater was killed by Lysimachus, after he fled from Demetrius I to Thrace. His wife was Eurydice, his paternal first cousin who was a daughter of Lysimachus. He and his brother were the last kings of Macedon to be descended from Perdiccas I.

Antipater I of Macedon Antipatrid dynasty Born: Unknown Died: Unknown
Preceded by Philip IV	King of Macedon; 297–294 BC	Succeeded by Demetrius I Poliorcetes
