= Coenus of Macedon =

Coenus

King of Macedonia
- Reign: unknown
- Predecessor: Caranus
- Successor: Tyrimmas
- Issue: Tyrimmas
- Dynasty: Argead dynasty
- Father: Caranus
- Mother: unknown
- Religion: Ancient Greek religion

Coenus or Koinos (Ancient Greek: Κοῖνος, romanized: Koînos) was according to later tradition the second king of the ancient kingdom of Macedonia.

The Macedonian historian Marsyas of Pella relates the following aetiological story regarding his name: "...a certain Knopis from Colchis came to Macedonia and lived in the court of Caranus; when the royal male child was born, Caranus had the desire to name him after his father, Kiraron or Kararon, but the mother opposed and wanted after her father the child to be named. When Knopis was asked responded: by neither name. Therefore he was called Koinos (common)".

== See also ==
- Chronicon (Eusebius)

| Preceded by Caranus | King of Macedon | Succeeded by Tyrimmas |
