= Aeropus II of Macedon =

King of Macedonia from 398/7 to 394/3 BC

Aeropus II
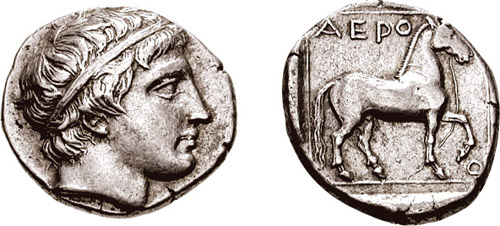
- Silver stater of Aeropos II

King of Macedonia
- Reign: 398/7 – July/August 394/3 BC
- Predecessor: Orestes
- Successor: Amyntas II
- Died: July/August 394/3 BC
- Issue: Pausanias
- Dynasty: Argead
- Father: Perdiccas II
- Religion: Ancient Greek religion

Aeropus II (Ancient Greek: Ἀέροπος, romanized: Aéropos), son of Perdiccas II, was king of the ancient Greek kingdom of Macedonia from 398/7 until his death from illness in July or August of 394/3 BC. He first governed as guardian (epitropos) (Note: Generally meaning a guardian or trustee in Ancient Greek, rather than regent. This word appears frequently in the works of Diodorous, Aristotle, and other Greek writers.) for his young nephew Orestes when Archelaus died in 400/399 BC. However, Diodorus reports that Aeropus murdered Orestes three years later, but it is also possible that he had simply won the support of the Macedonian nobility. As king, he might have taken the name Archelaus. Aeropus had a son named Pausanias, but was succeeded instead by Amyntas II, possibly son of his great-uncle Menelaus.

Two traditions relate how Aeropus was overawed by either the insolence or the stratagems of the Lacedaemonian king Agesilaus, allowing his armies free passage through Macedonia after their campaign in Asia.

There is a minority view among scholars that Aeropus was a Lyncestian prince, rather than an Argead, who married into the dynasty, therefore enabling him later to become regent for Orestes. However, the majority of historians believe Aeropus to have been Perdiccas' son and thus a member of the dynasty.

Aeropus II Argead dynasty Born: ? Died: July/August 394/3 BC
Royal titles
| Preceded by Orestes | King of Macedon; 398/7–July/August 394/3 BC | Succeeded by Amyntas II |
