= Cassander =

King of Macedonia, Antipatrid dynasty

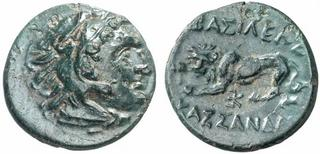
- Bronze coin of Cassander. The reverse depicts a lion and an inscription in Ancient Greek reading "ΒΑΣΙΛΕΩΣ ΚΑΣΣΑΝΔΡΟΥ", [of] King Cassander.

King of Macedonia
- Reign: 305 – 297 BC
- Predecessor: Alexander IV
- Successor: Philip IV
- Born: 355 BC
- Died: 297 BC (aged 58); Pella
- Spouse: Thessalonike of Macedon
- Issue: Philip IV; Alexander V; Antipater I
- House: Antipatrid dynasty
- Father: Antipater
- Religion: Ancient Greek Religion

Cassander (/kəˈsændər/; Ancient Greek: Κάσσανδρος, romanized: Kássandros; c. 355 BC – 297 BC) was king of the Ancient Greek kingdom of Macedonia from 305 BC until 297 BC, and de facto ruler of southern Greece from 317 BC until his death.

A son of Antipater and a contemporary of Alexander the Great, Cassander was one of the Diadochi who warred over Alexander's empire following the latter's death in 323 BC. Cassander later seized power by having Alexander's son and heir Alexander IV murdered. While governing Macedonia from 317 BC until 297 BC, Cassander focused on strengthening the northern borders and economic development, while founding or restoring several cities (including Thessalonica, Cassandreia, and Thebes); though his ruthlessness in dealing with political enemies influences assessments of his rule.

== Early history ==
In his youth, Cassander was taught by the philosopher Aristotle at the Lyceum in Macedonia. He was educated alongside Alexander the Great in a group that included Hephaestion, Ptolemy and Lysimachus. His family were distant collateral relatives to the Argead dynasty. It was custom in Ancient Macedonia for young men to kill a boar unaided before they could recline on a couch to dine, but at 25, Cassander still sat upright, evidently having not completed this rite. It has been suggested that his lack of physical prowess compared to other noblemen's sons may have been due to physical disability or ill-health.

Cassander is first recorded as arriving at Alexander the Great's court in Babylon in 323 BC, where he had been sent by his father, Antipater, most likely to help uphold Antipater's regency in Macedon, although a later contemporary who was hostile to the Antipatrids suggested that Cassander had journeyed to the court to poison the King. Cassander left Alexander's court either shortly before or after the king's death in June of 323 BC, playing no part in the immediate power struggles over the empire. Cassander returned to Macedonia and assisted his father's governance, he was later assigned by Antipater to Antigonus as his chiliarch from 321 to 320, probably to monitor the latter's activities.

== Rule of Macedon ==
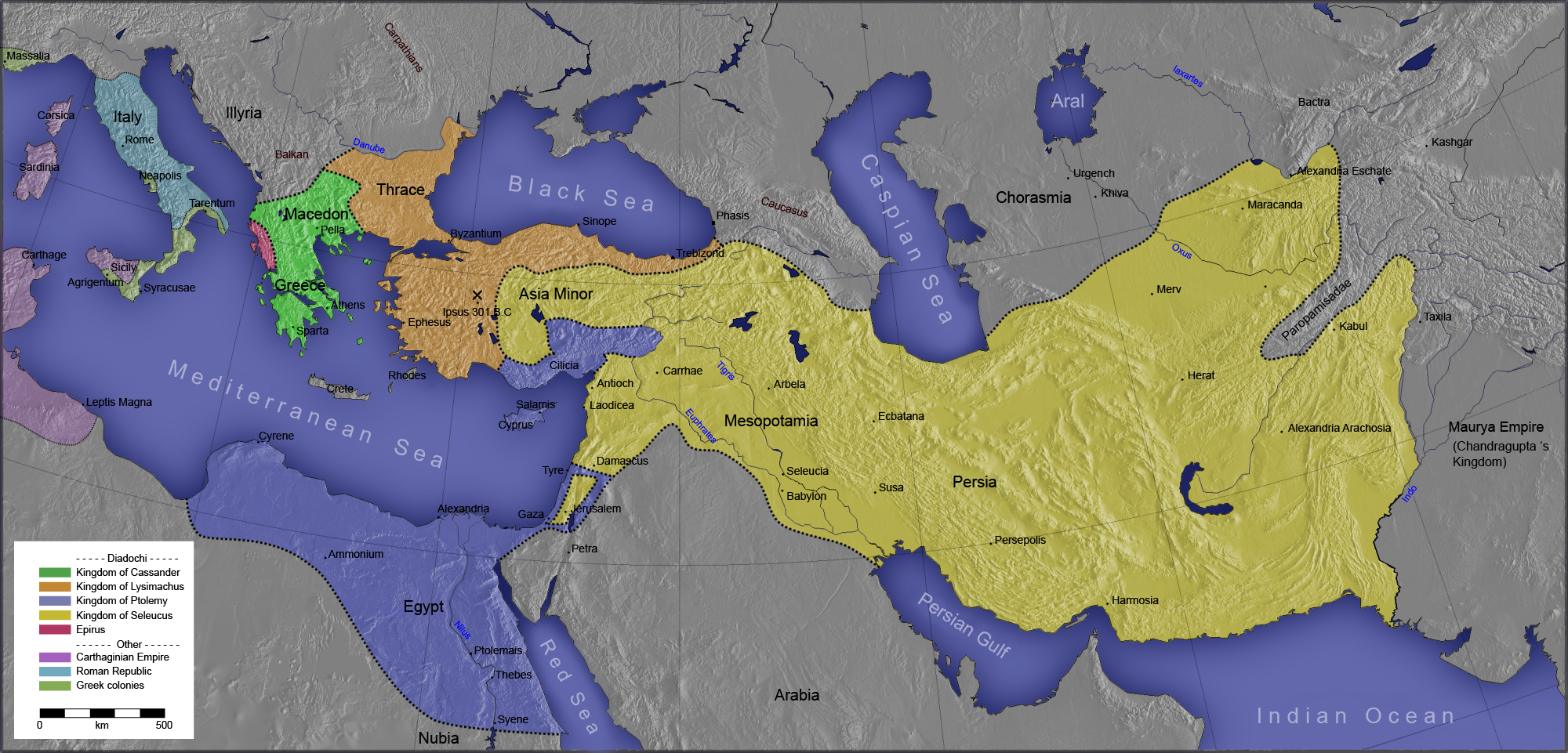
Kingdom of Cassander Other diadochi Kingdom of Seleucus Kingdom of Lysimachus Kingdom of Ptolemy Epirus Other Carthage Roman Republic Greek colonies

As Antipater grew close to death in 319 BC, he transferred the regency of Macedon not to Cassander, but to Polyperchon, possibly so as not to alarm the other Diadochi through an apparent move towards dynastic ambition, but perhaps also because of Cassander's own ambitions. Cassander rejected his father's decision, and immediately went to seek the support of Antigonus, Ptolemy and Lysimachus as his allies. Waging war on Polyperchon, Cassander destroyed his fleet, put Athens under the control of Demetrius of Phaleron, and declared himself Regent in 317 BC. After Olympias’ successful move against Philip III later in the year, Cassander besieged her in Pydna. When the city fell in the spring of 316, Olympias was killed, and Cassander had Alexander IV and Roxana confined at Amphipolis.

That year, Cassander associated himself with the Argead dynasty by marrying Alexander's half-sister, Thessalonike, and overseeing the burial of Phillip III and Eurydice in the royal cemetery at Aegae; he further cemented his authority by founding Thessalonica, Cassandreia, and rebuilding Thebes. From 314 to 310, Cassander campaigned to the west and north, for a time extending Macedonian power as far as Apollonia and Epidamus, but was driven out by local rulers like Glaucius; his rule in Macedonia remained firm as he resettled defeated enemies in the tradition of Phillip II and fostered trade in the regions around his new cities. Cassander had Alexander IV and Roxana secretly poisoned in either 310 BC or the following year.

By 309 BC, Polyperchon had begun to claim that Heracles of Macedon was the true heir to the Macedonian inheritance, at which point Cassander bribed Polyperchon to kill the boy, promising him an alliance and the return of his Macedonian estates. After this, Cassander's position in Greece and Macedonia was reasonably secure, and he proclaimed himself king in 305 BC. Diodorus Siculus relates that Cassander, Ptolemy, and Lysimachus declared their kingships in response to the assumption of royal title by Antigonus, following his victory over Ptolemy at Salamis in 306.

In 307–304 BC he fought the so-called Four–Years' War against Athens. In 304 BC, his rival Antigonus Monophthalmus sent his son Demetrius Poliorcetes to aid Athens against Cassander. Demetrius succeeded in driving Cassander from central Greece and created a Hellenic League, the League of Corinth, against him. In the winter of 303–302 BC, Cassander opened negotiations with Antigonus with a view to establish peace, but Antigonus refused. At this Cassander turned to Lysimachus, Ptolemy, and Seleucus and convinced them to reform the coalition of 314–311 against Antigonus. In early 302 BC, Cassander sent one of his generals, Prepelaus, with an army from Macedon to join Lysimachus in an invasion of Antigonus's territory in Asia-Minor. Cassander himself marched with the main Macedonian field army into Thessaly to stop Demetrius from advancing into Macedon. Demetrius invaded Thessaly with a numerically superior force, Cassander stopped his advance by refusing to give battle and fortifying his positions. Lysimachus and Prepalaus had been very successful in Asia-Minor and Seleucus was marching with an army to join them. In the spring of 302 BC, Antigonus marched with an army from Syria into Asia-Minor to confront his enemies; he confronted Lysimachus and drove him from Phrygia. Antigonus realizing that the war would probably have to be decided in a major battle in Asia-Minor recalled Demetrius from Thessaly. With Demetrius gone Cassander sent part of his army with his brother, Pleistarchus, to join Prepalaus, Lysimachus and Seleucus in Asia-Minor. In 301 BC, the combined armies of Lysimachus, Seleucus, Prepalaus and Pleistarchus faced the combined armies of Antigonus and Demetrius at Ipsus. After the Battle of Ipsus in which Antigonus was killed, Cassander was undisputed in his control of Macedon; however, he had little time to savour the fact, dying of dropsy in 297 BC.

Cassander's dynasty did not live much beyond his death, with his son Philip dying of natural causes, and his other sons Alexander and Antipater becoming involved in a destructive dynastic struggle along with their mother. When Alexander was ousted as joint king by his brother, Demetrius I took up Alexander's appeal for aid and ousted Antipater, killed Alexander V and established the Antigonid dynasty. The remaining Antipatrids, such as Antipater II Etesias, were unable to re-establish the Antipatrids on the throne.

== Legacy ==
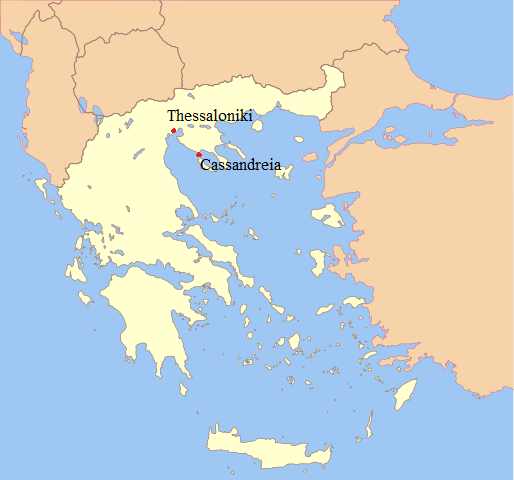
Locations of Thessaloniki and Cassandreia in modern Greece.

Cassander stood out amongst the Diadochi in his hostility to Alexander's memory. Arrian later reported that he could not pass a statue of Alexander without feeling faint. Cassander has been perceived to be ambitious and unscrupulous, and even members of his own family were estranged from him. However, historians like John D. Grainger argue this characterization owes much to stories spread by his rivals.

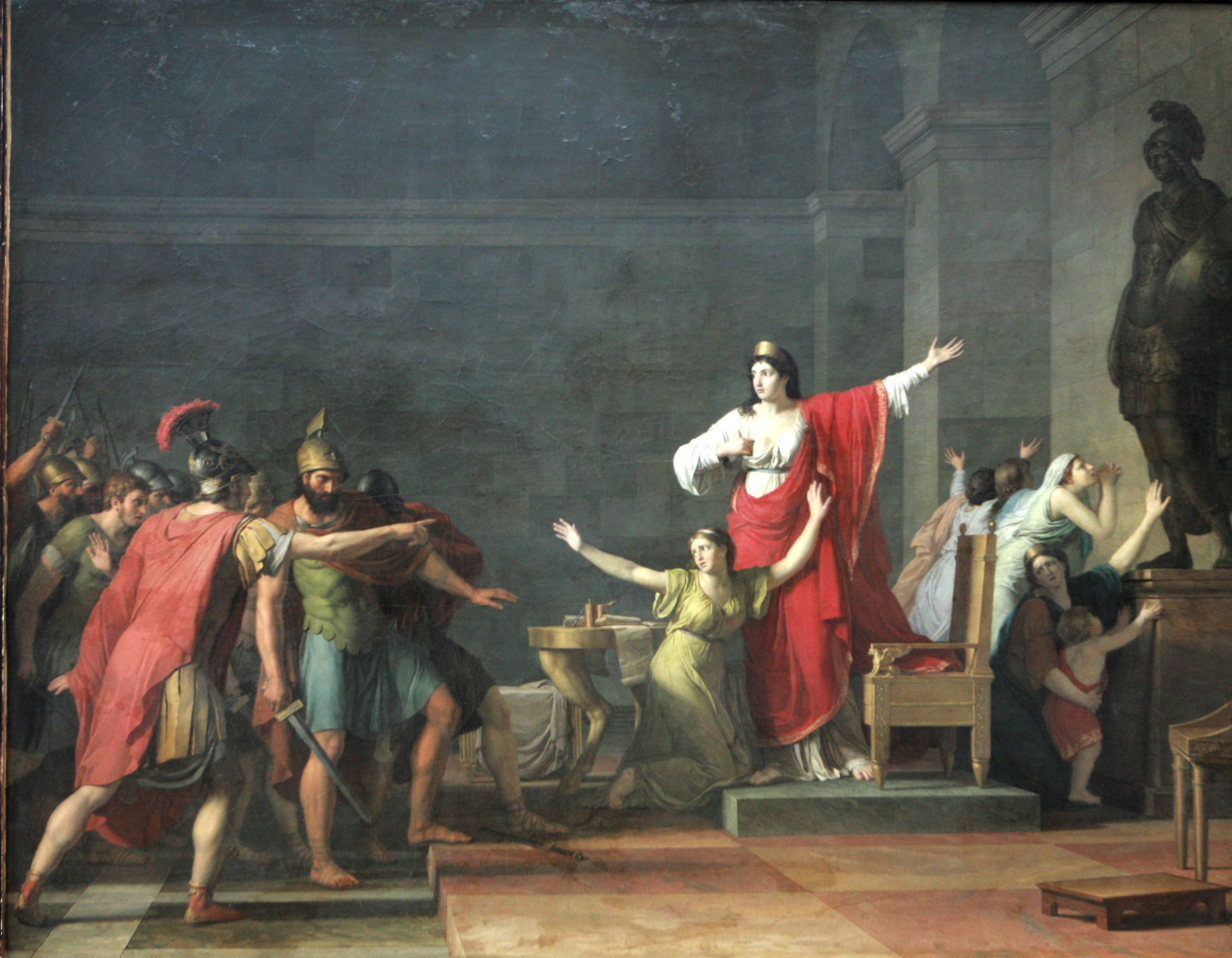
"Cassander and Olympias", painting by Jean-Joseph Taillasson

Cassander was responsible for the deaths of more Argeads than other Diadochi (Alexander IV, Roxana, and Alexander's supposed illegitimate son Heracles, as well as allowing Olympias to be killed by a Macedonian assembly), though he was not the only one willing to kill Alexander's relatives: Polyperchon and Antigonus were just as willing to do the same when it benefitted them. From numismatic evidence, Evan Pitt argues that Cassander's actions until 311 BC were motivated more by self-preservation and maintenance of his own power rather than royal ambition and rivalry to Alexander the Great. Cassander's decision to restore Thebes, which had been destroyed by Alexander, was perceived at the time to be a snub to the deceased king, though it also had the realpolitik effect of providing a power base for Cassander in Boeotia.

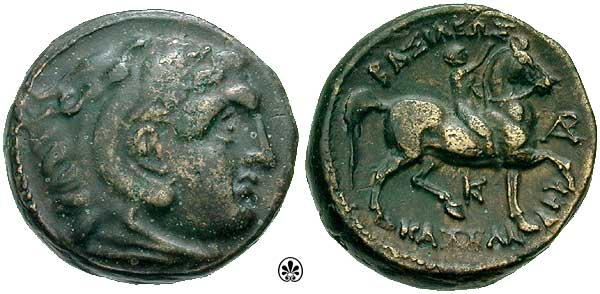
Coin of Cassander minted after 310 BC, displaying Herakles wearing the lion pelt cloak. Reverse with the Greek inscription: ΒΑΣΙΛΕΩΣ ΚΑΣΣΑΝΔΡΟΥ, Basileōs Kassandrou, "of King Cassander".

Like the other Diadochoi, Cassander participated in the appropriation of regal iconography which linked him to Alexander the Great. Other Diadochi depicted themselves and Alexander on their coins in profile with varying attributes, such as elephant-hide headdresses or horns; Cassander followed Alexander's own precedent and depicted Herakles wearing the lion headdress - a design which had first been used in Macedonia by Alexander's grandfather Amyntas III, albeit with a bearded Herakles, and then again under Alexander, this time clean-shaven. However, despite common misconception, this design was not intended to be a portrait of Alexander, and furthermore there is no evidence that Cassander later co-opted the image to depict himself. These royal iconographies established by Alexander and continued by his immediate successors set patterns for royal coinage which were influential and enduring across the Mediterranean and West Asia. Also of lasting significance was Cassander's refoundation of Therma into Thessalonica, naming the city after his wife. Cassander also founded Cassandreia upon the ruins of Potidaea, as well as the city of Antipatreia in the Aspros Valley.

== Notes ==
Cassander Antipatrid dynasty Born: c. 355 BC Died: 297 BC
Preceded by Polyperchon	Regent of Macedon; 317–305 BC	Succeeded by Assumed Kingship
Preceded by Alexander IV	King of Macedon; 305–297 BC	Succeeded by Philip IV
