= Pausanias of Macedon =

King of Macedonia from 394/3 to 393/2 BC

Pausanias
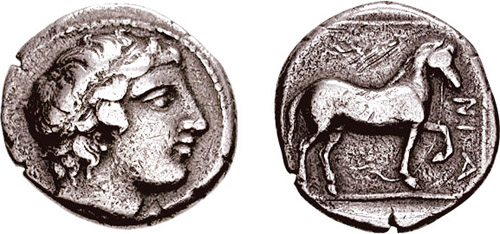
- Silver stater of Pausanias

King of Macedonia
- Reign: August/September 394/3 – 393/2 BC
- Predecessor: Amyntas II
- Successor: Amyntas III
- Born: Unknown
- Died: 393/2 BC
- Dynasty: Argead
- Father: Aeropus II
- Mother: unknown
- Religion: Ancient Greek religion

Pausanias (Ancient Greek: Παυσανίας Pausanías) (Note: He likely would have been called Παυσανίας Ἀέροπου or Παυσανίας ὁ Μακεδών, but Diodorous refers to him as "Pausanias the king of the Macedonians" in Bibliotheca historica) was king of the ancient Greek kingdom of Macedon for around a year, from 394/3 to 393/2. He was the son of Aeropus II and an unknown mother, but he did not succeed his father when Aeropus died in July or August 394/3 BC. Instead, Amyntas II ruled Macedonia for several months before being assassinated in August or September 394/3 by the Elimieotan Derdas. According to Diodorus, Pausanias himself was assassinated sometime in 393/2 by Amyntas III, who then succeeded him as King of Macedonia. However, Diodorus also entirely omits the reign of Amyntas II who all other ancient sources and modern scholars agree ruled before Pausanias.

There is a minority view among scholars that Aeropus II was a Lyncestian prince, rather than an Argead, who married into the dynasty, therefore enabling him later to become regent for Orestes. Of course, this implies that Pausanias was not an Argead as well. However, the majority of historians believe Aeropus to be Perdiccas II's son and thus a member of the dynasty.

Pausanias Argead dynasty Born: ? Died: 393/2 BC
Royal titles
Preceded by Amyntas II	King of Macedon; August/September 394/3 – 393/2 BC	Succeeded by Amyntas III
