= Crateuas of Macedon =

Lover of Archelaus of Macedon

Crateuas (Ancient Greek: Κρατεύας, romanized: Krateúas), also called Craterus (Κρατερός, Kraterós), was a Royal Page and lover of the Macedonian king Archelaus. Ancient sources accuse Crateuas of killing Archelaus in 399 BC, either by accident or as an act of vengeance.

Two ancient sources describe the homicide: Aristotle in Politics and Diodorus in Bibliotheca Historica. According to Aristotle, Crateuas fell out with the king because Archelaus had promised him one of his daughters in marriage but later gave them to others and that their love affair had gone wrong. Two other courtiers, Hellanocrates of Larisa and Decamnichus, took part in the murder for similar private motives. Diodorus, on the other hand, records that “King Archelaus was unintentionally struck while hunting by Craterus, whom he loved, and met his end, after a reign of seven years”.

A third account of the death of Archelaus appears in the Second Alcibiades, a dialogue wrongly attributed to Plato. This version, whose true author remains unknown, states that Crateuas coveted power and occupied the throne for several days after the murder. However, historian Nicholas Hammond viewed the idea that Crateuas actually reigned as king of Macedon to be "obviously absurd". Accordingly, Crateuas is not included in modern lists of Macedonian kings.
