= Gauanes =

Gauanes (Greek: Γαυάνης) was the older brother of Aeropus and Perdiccas I of Macedon, as Herodotus (8.137-139) narrates. According to N. G. L. Hammond: Gauanes may be a dialectal version of Gaianes, because one finds Auos as a variant of Aias and Parauaians, the ones who live by the Aoos river. Gaianes seems related to Aianos, the founder of Aiane in Elimeia (Stephanus of Byzantium, s.v. Aiane). If this is true, Gauanes took the kingdom of Elimiotis and Aeropus, presumably, the kingdom of Lynkestis.

== See also ==
- Argead dynasty
