= Amyntas II of Macedon =

5th-century Macedonian ruler

Amyntas II
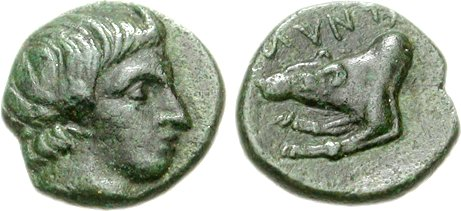
- Bronze of Amyntas II. The male deity on the obverse is unidentified, but the wolf on the reverse is taken from the coins of Argos, the alleged origin of the Argead kings. His name is spelt [A]MYNT[A].

King of Macedonia
- Reign: July/August – August/September 394/3
- Predecessor: Aeropus II
- Successor: Pausanias
- Died: August/September 394/3 BC
- Spouse: daughter of Archelaus (name unknown)
- Issue: Disputed: Ptolemy of Aloros
- Dynasty: Argead dynasty
- Father: Disputed: Menelaus, son of Alexander I Archelaus
- Religion: Ancient Greek religion

Amyntas II (Ancient Greek: Ἀμύντας), also known as Amyntas "the Little", was king of the ancient Greek kingdom of Macedon for several months around 394/3 BC. He became king in July or August of 394/3 after the death of Aeropus II, but he was soon after assassinated by an Elimieotan nobleman named Derdas and succeeded by Aeropus' son Pausanias.

He was likely the son of Menelaus, second son of Alexander I, but he could have also been the son of Archelaus. The most influential view, advanced by Historian Nicholas Hammond, is that Archelaus married his younger daughter to Amyntas or Amyntas' son in order to stave off a future power struggle with the line of Menelaus. The argument is based in part on a line from Aelian's Varia Historia about an Amyntas being Menelaus' son. The alternative theory holds that the polygamous Archelaus married his son (Amyntas) to his daughter to cement the branch lines: a half-brother and a half-sister.

Ptolemy of Aloros, future regent for Perdiccas III, was possibly the son of Amyntas and Archelaus' daughter, whose name is unknown. Diodorus simply refers to Ptolemy as a "son of Amyntas," which Hammond argued must mean Amyntas II because all other sons of Amyntas III are accounted for. However, the relevant text is almost universally regarded as corrupt and might actually say "Ptolemy the Alorite fraudulently murdered the son of Amyntas, Alexander."

When listing the kings of Macedonia, Diodorus omits Amyntas' reign, but all other ancient sources, as well as modern scholars, agree that he ruled before Pausanias.

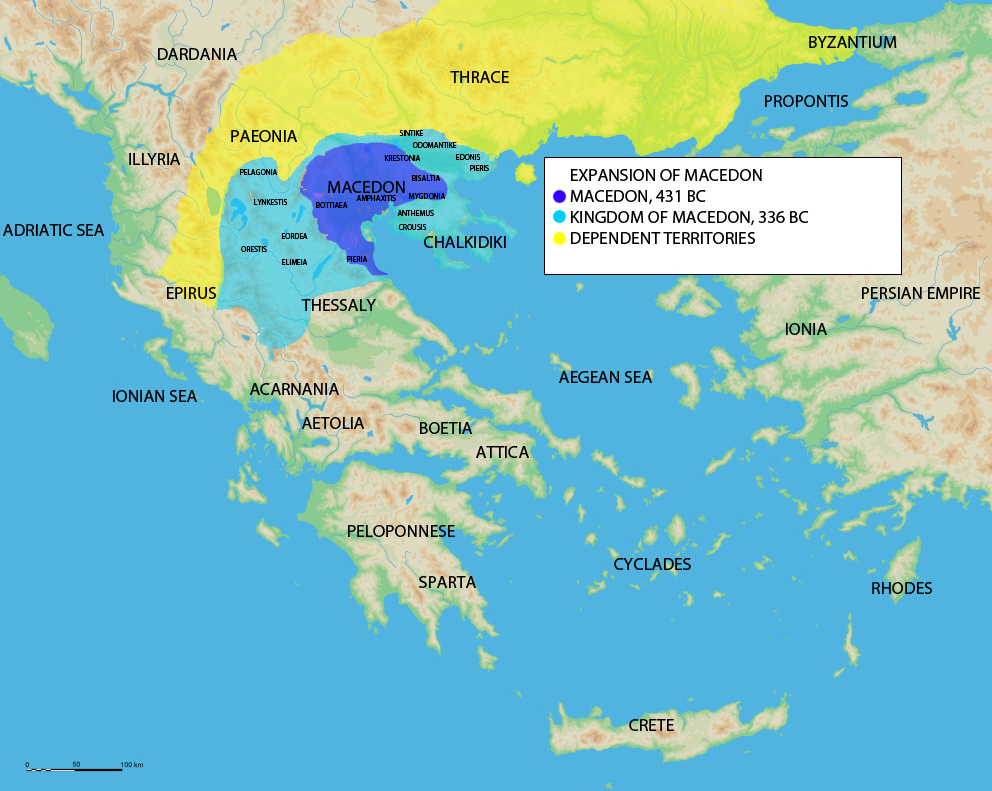
Macedon in the Time of Amyntas II

Amyntas II Argead dynasty Born: ? Died: August/September 394/3 BC
Royal titles
Preceded by Aeropus II	King of Macedon; July/August – August/September 394/3 BC	Succeeded by Pausanias
