= Alexander V of Macedon =

King of Macedon

Alexander V
- Basileus
- Copper coin struck during his reign. Obv.: head of Herakles facing right, wearing lionskin headdress; rev.: horseback rider. Minted in Amphipolis.

King of Macedonia
- Reign: Autumn 297 – Autumn 294
- Predecessor: Philip IV
- Successor: Demetrius I
- Died: Late 294 BC; Larissa
- Spouse: Lysandra
- House: Antipatrid dynasty
- Father: Cassander
- Mother: Thessalonike of Macedon
- Religion: Ancient Greek Religion

Alexander V of Macedon (Greek: Ἀλέξανδρος Εʹ ὁ Μακεδών; died late 294 BC) was the second son of Cassander and Thessalonike of Macedon, who was a half-sister of Alexander the Great. He ruled as king of Macedon along with his brother Antipater I from the autumn of 297 to autumn 294 BC.

When Antipater murdered their mother and ousted him from power, Alexander turned to Pyrrhus and Demetrius I for help in recovering his throne. To the former he promised, as the price of his alliance, the land on the sea-coast of Macedonia, together with the provinces of Ambracia, Acarnania, and Amfilochia. Demetrius, according to Plutarch, arrived after Pyrrhus had retired, and when matters had been settled between Alexander and Antipater. Demetrius was now an unwelcome visitor, and Alexander, while he received him with all outward civility, is said by Plutarch to have laid a plan for murdering him at a banquet, a plan which was stymied by the precautions of Demetrius. The next day Demetrius took his departure, and Alexander attended him as far as Thessaly. Here, at Larissa, Alexander went to dine with Demetrius, and, taking no guards with him, was assassinated, together with his friends who attended him. He and his brother were the last kings of Macedon to be descended from Perdiccas I.

Alexander V of Macedon Antipatrid dynasty Born: Unknown Died: 294 BC
Preceded by Philip IV	King of Macedon; 297–294 BC	Succeeded by Demetrius I
