= Caranus of Macedon =

Caranus
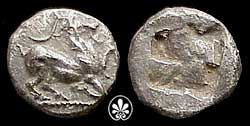
- Pre 500 BC Aigai Trihemiobol associated with the Karanos Oracle

King of Macedonia
- Reign: unknown
- Successor: Coenus
- Issue: Coenus
- Dynasty: Argead
- Father: Temenus
- Religion: Ancient Greek religion

Caranus or Karanos (Greek: Κάρανος, romanized: Káranos) was the first king of the ancient kingdom of Macedonia according to later traditions. According to Herodotus, however, the first king was Perdiccas I. Caranus is first reported by Theopompus and is the mythical founder of the Argead dynasty.

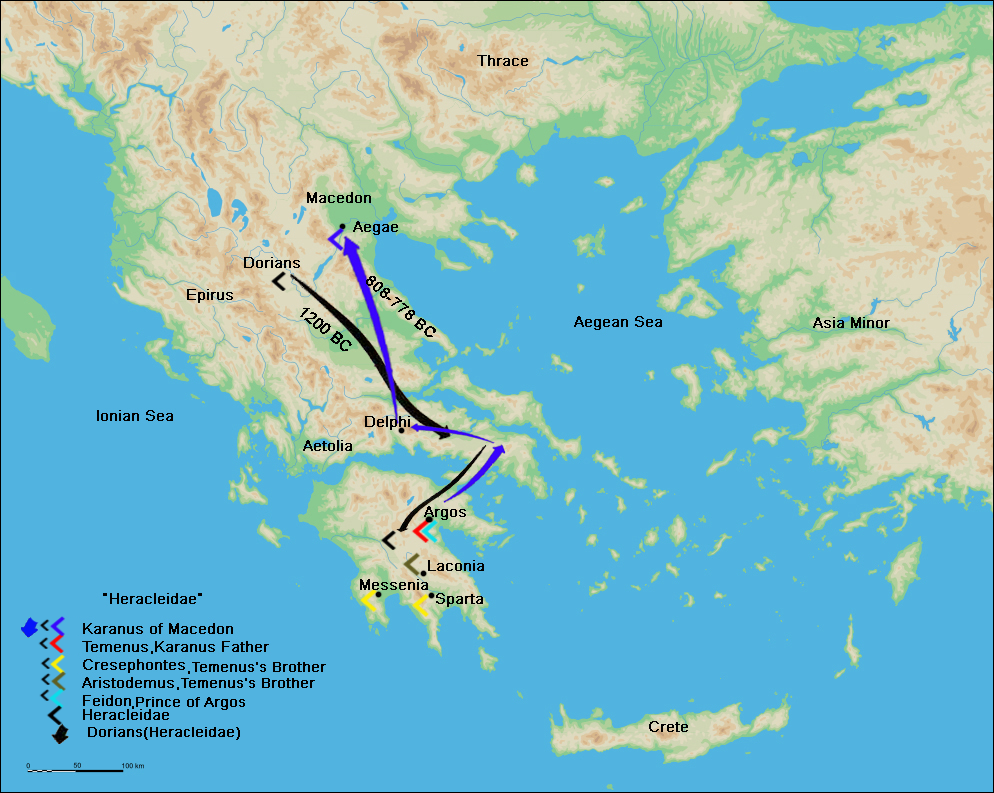
Caranus' way is labeled by the blue colour

== Myth ==
According to a Greek myth, Caranus was the son of Temenus, king of Argos, who in turn was a Heraclid, a descendant of Heracles. Plutarch agrees on the Heraclid lineage of Caranus and argues that Alexander the Great is a descendant of Heracles through Caranus. Temenus, along with Cresphontes and Aristodemus were the three Doric leaders who invaded the Mycenean Peloponnese region. Then they proceeded to divide the conquered territories between them. Cresphontes was given Messenia and Sparta; Aristodemus took Laconia; and finally Temenus was given Argos. Following the death of Temenus, the princes argued about who should be king. One of them, Pheidon, defeated his brothers in battle and took over the kingship. Caranus then decided to find another kingdom of his own, where he could be king. First, however he went to the Oracle of Delphi to ask Pythia's advice. "Where thou shalt see white-horned goats [...] raise the chief city of a state." Thus Caranus and his entourage moved to the North, in search of suitable land to establish his new kingdom. Finally, he discovered a green valley, with a lot of game and goats, whereupon he thought that the prophecy of Pythia had been fulfilled. Thus he built a city there, which he named Aigai (Greek: Αἰγαί), present day Vergina, a site of substantial archaeological activity, as numerous important findings have been unearthed.

== View of historians ==
According to Justin (7.1) citing Marsyas of Pella

Caranus also came to Emathia with a large band of Greeks, being instructed by an oracle to seek a home in Macedonia. Here, following a herd of goats running from a downpour, he seized the city of Edessa, the inhabitants being taken unawares because of heavy rain and dense fog. Remembering the oracle's command to follow the lead of goats in his quest for an empire, Caranus established the city as his capital, and thereafter he made it a solemn observance, wheresoever he took his army, to keep those same goats before his standards in order to have as leaders in his exploits the animals which he had had with him to found the kingdom. He gave the city of Edessa the name Aegae and its people the name Aegeads in memory of this service.

According to Chronicon (Eusebius)

Before the first Olympiad, Caranus was moved by ambition to collect forces from the Argives and from the rest of the Peloponnese, in order to lead an army into the territory of the Macedonians. At that time the king of the Orestae was at war with his neighbours, the Eordaei, and he called on Caranus to come to his aid, promising to give him half of his territory in return, if the Orestae were successful. The king kept his promise, and Caranus took possession of the territory; he reigned there for 30 years, until he died in old age. He was succeeded by his son Coenus, who was king for 28 years.

According to Livy (The History of Rome, 45.9.3)

From Caranus, the first king, twenty monarchs are enumerated down to Perseus.

== See also ==
- Heracleidae
