= Philip IV of Macedon =

King of Macedon in 297 BC

Philip IV
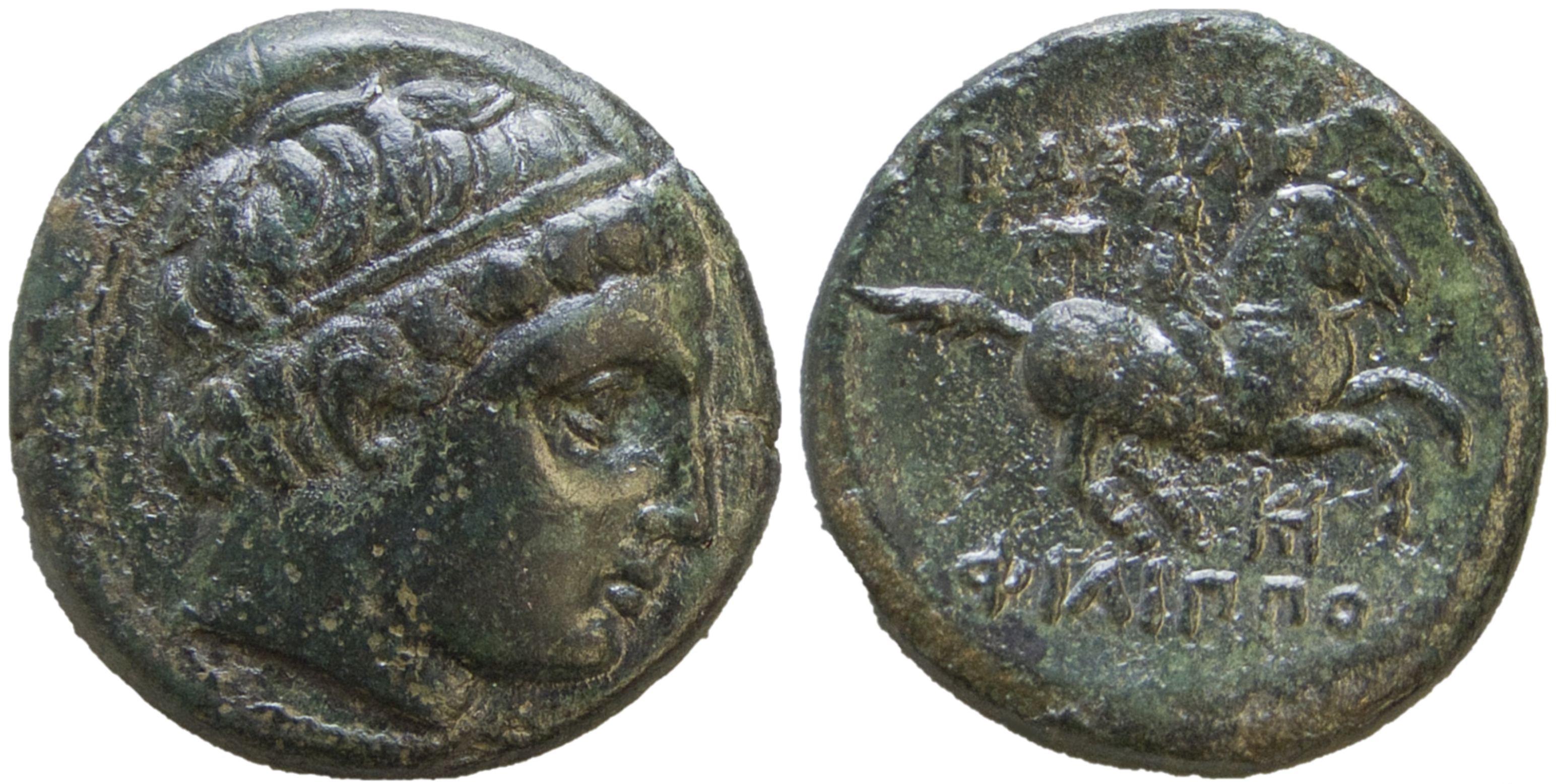
- Copper coin struck sometime during Philip's reign. Obv.: head of Apollo facing right; rev.: horseback rider.

King of Macedonia
- Reign: 297 BC
- Predecessor: Cassander
- Successor: Antipater I and Alexander V
- Born: Unknown
- Died: 297 BC; Elateia
- House: Antipatrid Dynasty
- Father: Cassander
- Mother: Thessalonike
- Religion: Ancient Greek Religion

Philip IV (Ancient Greek: Φίλιππος, romanized: Phílippos) was briefly king of the ancient Greek kingdom of Macedonia in 297 BC. He belonged to the Antipatrid dynasty and was the son of Thessalonike, daughter of Philip II, and Cassander, king of Macedonia.

Philip succeeded his father unopposed after Cassander succumbed to tuberculosis in 297 at Pella. However, Philip died four months later in Elateia of the same disease, leaving the throne to his two younger brothers, Antipater and Alexander.

Philip IV Antipatrid dynasty Born: ? Died: 297 BC
Regnal titles
Preceded by Cassander	King of Macedon; 297 BC	Succeeded by Antipater I and Alexander V
