= Thessalonike of Macedon =

Macedonian princess (353/2 or 346/5 BC – 295 BC)

Thessalonike
- Θεσσαλονίκη
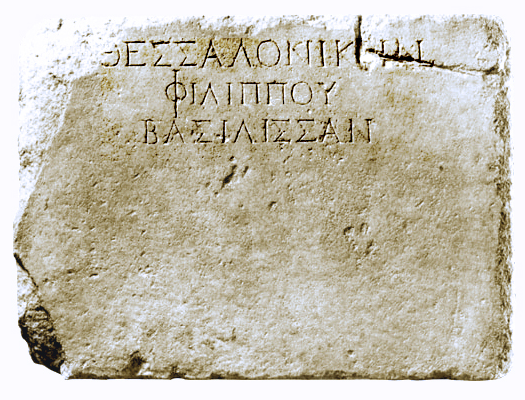
- Inscription reading "To Queen Thessalonike, (Daughter) of Philip", Archaeological Museum of Thessaloniki
- Born: 353/2 or 346/5 BC
- Died: 295 BC
- Spouse: Cassander
- Children: Philip IV of Macedon; Antipater I of Macedon; Alexander V of Macedon
- Parents: Philip II (father); Nicesipolis (mother)
- Relatives: Alexander the Great (half-brother); Cleopatra of Macedon (half-sister); Cynane (half-sister); Philip III of Macedon (half-brother)

Thessalonike (Ancient Greek: Θεσσαλονίκη; 353/2 or 346/5 BC – 295 BC) was a Macedonian Greek princess, the daughter of King Philip II of Macedon by his Thessalian wife or concubine, Nicesipolis. History links her to three of the most powerful men in Macedon—daughter of King Philip II, half-sister of Alexander the Great and wife of Cassander.

== Life ==
Thessalonike's date of birth is unknown. While there is a consensus that her name commemorates her father's victory in Thessaly (it is a composite of "Thessaly" and "nike," the Greek word for "victory"), it is unclear which victory it specifically references. Some historians cite her birth as being as early as 353 or 352 BC, but 346/5 may be more accurate. According to one narrative, to commemorate the birth of his daughter, which fell on the same day as the armies of Macedon and Thessalian league won the significant battle of Crocus Field in Thessaly over the Phocians, King Philip is said to have proclaimed, "Let her be called victory in Thessaly." Nicesipolis did not live long after Thessalonike's birth. According to Stephanus of Byzantium, Philip gave the baby to a woman named Nice to raise. Olympias, who may have been a friend of Nicesipolis, may have taken Thessalonike to be raised as her own daughter following her mother's death.

Little is known about Thessalonike's early life. Philip II did not arrange Thessalonike's marriage, as he did for her sisters, likely due to her youth at the time of his death. Thessalonike appears to have been brought up by her stepmother Olympias, though little is recorded about her youth. Thessalonike was, by far, the youngest child in Olympias' care. Her interaction with her older brother Alexander would have been minimal, as he was under the tutelage of Aristotle in "The Gardens of Midas" when she was born, and at the age of six or seven when he left on his Persian campaign. She was only twenty-one when Alexander died. Alexander did not arrange a marriage for Thessalonike, likely to avoid creating political rivals. After Alexander's death, Olympias tried to arrange a marriage for her own daughter, Cleopatra of Macedon, but did not do the same for Thessalonike (already old for a royal bride), likely also for political reasons.

Thessalonike returned to Macedon in 317 BC with Olympias. She, along with Olympias, Roxana, Alexander IV of Macedon, and Alexander's betrothed, Deidameia, sought refuge in the fortress of Pydna on the advance of Cassander in 315 BC. The fall of Pydna and the execution of her stepmother threw her into the power of Cassander, who embraced the opportunity to connect himself with the Argead dynasty by marrying her, possibly by force. Historians disagree regarding whether Cassander favoured Thessalonike over her sister Cleopatra, possibly due to a weaker connection with Alexander and stronger one with Philip II, or if Thessalonike was his second choice.

Thessalonike became queen of Macedon and the mother of three sons, Philip, Antipater, and Alexander. After the death of Cassander, Thessalonike appears to have at first retained much influence over her sons in 295 BC. Her son Philip succeeded his father, but died shortly after taking the throne. Shortly after Philip's death, Antipater murdered his mother. The reason for this is unclear, but most sources say that it was due to jealousy. Justin claimed that Thessalonike demanded that Antipater, the next eldest son, share the rule with Alexander. The decision to kill his mother, rather than Alexander, may imply that Thessalonike was acting as regent for Alexander, as many of her female relatives had done previously.

== City of Thessaloniki ==
Cassander named the city Thessaloniki after his wife. Thessaloniki was founded on the site of ancient Therma, and soon became, and still is, one of the most wealthy and populous cities of Macedon and then capital of the Roman province of Macedonia. Thessalonice was likely the first city to be named for a Macedonian woman, though the trend continued. Today, Thessaloniki is the second largest city of Greece, the largest city of Macedonia, Greece and the capital of Central Macedonia.

== Legend of Thessalonike ==
A popular Greek legend has it that Thessalonike became a mermaid who lived in the Aegean after the death of Alexander the Great. The legend states that Alexander, in his quest for the Fountain of Immortality, retrieved with great exertion a flask of immortal water. In some versions of the story, he used the water to wash his sister's hair, making her immortal; in others, he forgot to tell her the contents of the flask and so used it to water a wild onion plant. When Alexander died his grief-stricken sister attempted to end her life by jumping into the sea. Instead of drowning, however, she became a mermaid who passes judgment on mariners throughout the centuries and across the seven seas. To the sailors who encounter her, she always poses the same question: "Is king Alexander alive?" (Greek: Ζει ο βασιλεύς Αλέξανδρος;), to which the correct answer would be "He lives and reigns and conquers the world" (Greek: Ζει και βασιλεύει, και τον κόσμο κυριεύει!). Given this answer, she would allow the ship and her crew to sail safely away in calm seas. Any other answer would transform her into the raging Gorgon, bent on sending the ship and every sailor on board to the bottom of the sea.
