= Marsyas of Pella =

Greek historian

Marsyas of Pella (Ancient Greek: Μαρσύας Περιάνδρου Πελλαῖος; c. 356 BC – c. 294 BC), son of Periander, was a Greek historian. According to the Suda Encyclopedia, he was a brother of Antigonus I Monophthalmus, who was afterwards king of Asia, by which an uterine brother alone can be meant, as the father of Antigonus was named Philip. Both of these statements point to his being of noble birth, and appear strangely at variance with the assertion that he was a mere professional grammarian Grammatodidascalus, a statement which Robert Geier conjectures plausibly enough to refer in fact to Marsyas of Philippi. Suidas, indeed, seems in many points to have confounded the two. The only other fact transmitted to us concerning the life of Marsyas, is that he was appointed by Demetrius Poliorcetes to command one division of his fleet in the Battle of Salamis in Cyprus (306 BC) (Diodorus, xx. 50.). However, this circumstance is alone sufficient to show that he was a person who himself took an active part in public affairs, not a mere man of letters. It is probable that he followed the fortunes of his stepbrother Antigonus.

His principal work was a history of Macedonia, Makedonika, in 10 books, commencing from the earliest times, and coming down to the wars of Alexander in Asia, when it terminated abruptly in 331 BC, with the return of the monarch into Syria, after the conquest of Egypt and the foundation of Alexandria. It is repeatedly cited by Athenaeus, Plutarch, Harpocration, Gnaeus Pompeius Trogus and Justin (historian). Suidas also speaks of a history on the education of Alexander (Αλεξάνδρου αγωγή), and a treatise on the history of antiquities of Athens (Αττικά) in 12 books, which is considered by Bernhardy and Geier to be the same with Archaeology of Marsyas the younger.

== See also ==
- Marsyas of Philippi
