= Archelaus of Macedon =

King of Macedon from 413 to 399 BC

Archelaus
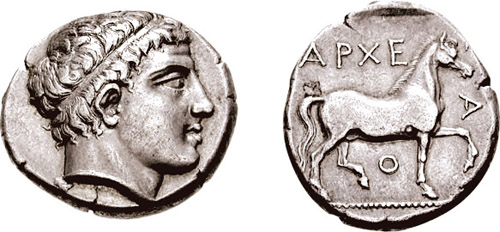
- Didrachm of Archelaus

King of Macedonia
- Reign: 413–399 BC
- Predecessor: Perdiccas II
- Successor: Orestes
- Born: Unknown
- Died: 399 BC
- Spouse: Cleopatra (Note: Possibly the same woman as his step-mother and wife of Perdiccas II)
- Issue: Orestes two unnamed daughters Disputed: Amyntas II; Argaeus II; Pausanias (Note: Not the son of Aeropus II nor the assassin of Philip II)
- Dynasty: Argead
- Father: Perdiccas II
- Mother: Simache
- Sports career
- Born: Macedon
- Event: Tethrippon
Medal record
Ancient Greek Olympics
Representing Macedon
Olympic Games
Gold medal – first place	408 BC Olympia	Tethrippon

Archelaus (/ˌɑːrkɪˈleɪ.əs/; Ancient Greek: Ἀρχέλαος, romanized: Archélaos; died 399 BC) was king of the ancient Greek kingdom of Macedon from 413 to 399 BC. He was a capable and beneficent ruler, known for the sweeping changes he made in state administration, the military, and commerce. By the time that he died, Archelaus had succeeded in converting Macedon into a significantly stronger power. Thucydides credited Archelaus with doing more for his kingdom's military infrastructure than all of his predecessors together.

== Family ==
Archelaus was the son of Perdiccas II and his wife, Simache, who is thought to have been once enslaved by Archelaus' uncle, Alcetas. Plato, through his interlocutors in Gorgias, wrote that Archelaus murdered both his uncle Alcetas and his unnamed seven year old half-brother to gain the throne, but this can not be confirmed. There is evidence to suggest that Cleopatra, the boy's mother and Archelaus' step-mother, was in fact the same person as Archelaus' wife. For example, Aristotle refers to a wife of Archelaus as Cleopatra in Politics. Historian Nicholas Hammond argued that this is only coincidence and that Cleopatra was a common name for girls in Macedonia. However, there is little evidence to suggest that it was actually a frequent name in the fifth-century. Nevertheless, Archelaus had at least one child with a woman called Cleopatra.

Archelaus had at least two daughters. Aristotle reports that Archelaus gave his eldest daughter to the king of Elimea while in a war against the Lyncestae and the younger to the future ruler Amyntas II (whom he labels Archelaus' son). His actual son, Orestes, would go on to be king, but there is confusion over whether or not Archelaus is the father of Argaeus II and Amyntas. Theopompus of Chios wrote that "they call both Argaios and Pausanias Archelaos [sic]" which Hammond emends to read, "they call both Argaeus and Pausanias the son of Archelaus." The possibility that Argaeus was an Argaed is likely and, moreover, scholars are able to account for almost all other descendants of Alexander I. This line of thinking would also have the later royal challenger to Ptolemy of Aloros and Philip II, Pausanias (not the son of Aeropus II nor the assassin of Philip), be the son of Archelaus. However, not all historians are in agreement and the claim remains largely unverifiable.

Amyntas was most likely the son of Menelaus, Alexander I's second son, but he could have also been the son of Archelaus. The prevailing view, advanced by Hammond, is that Archelaus married his younger daughter to Amyntas or Amyntas' son in order to stave off a future power struggle with the line of Menelaus. The argument is based in part on a line from Aelian's Varia Historia about an Amyntas being Menelaus' son. The alternative theory holds that the polygamous Archelaus married his son (Amyntas) to his daughter to cement the branch lines: a half-brother and a half-sister.

== Reign ==
Almost immediately after he took power, Archelaus was faced with a situation which allowed him to completely reverse Macedon's relationship with Athens, which had been a major threat for the past half century. The Athenians experienced a crushing defeat at Syracuse in late 413 during which most of their ships were destroyed. This left the Athenians in desperate need of a huge amount of timber to build new ships and Archelaus in a position to set the price. Archelaus generously supplied the Athenians with the timber they needed. In recognition of this, the Athenians honored Archelaus and his children with the titles of proxenos and euergetes.

Archelaus went on to institute many internal reforms. He issued an abundance of good quality coinage. He built strongholds, cut straight roads (important for movement of the military), and improved the organization of the military, particularly the cavalry and hoplite infantry.

== Culture ==
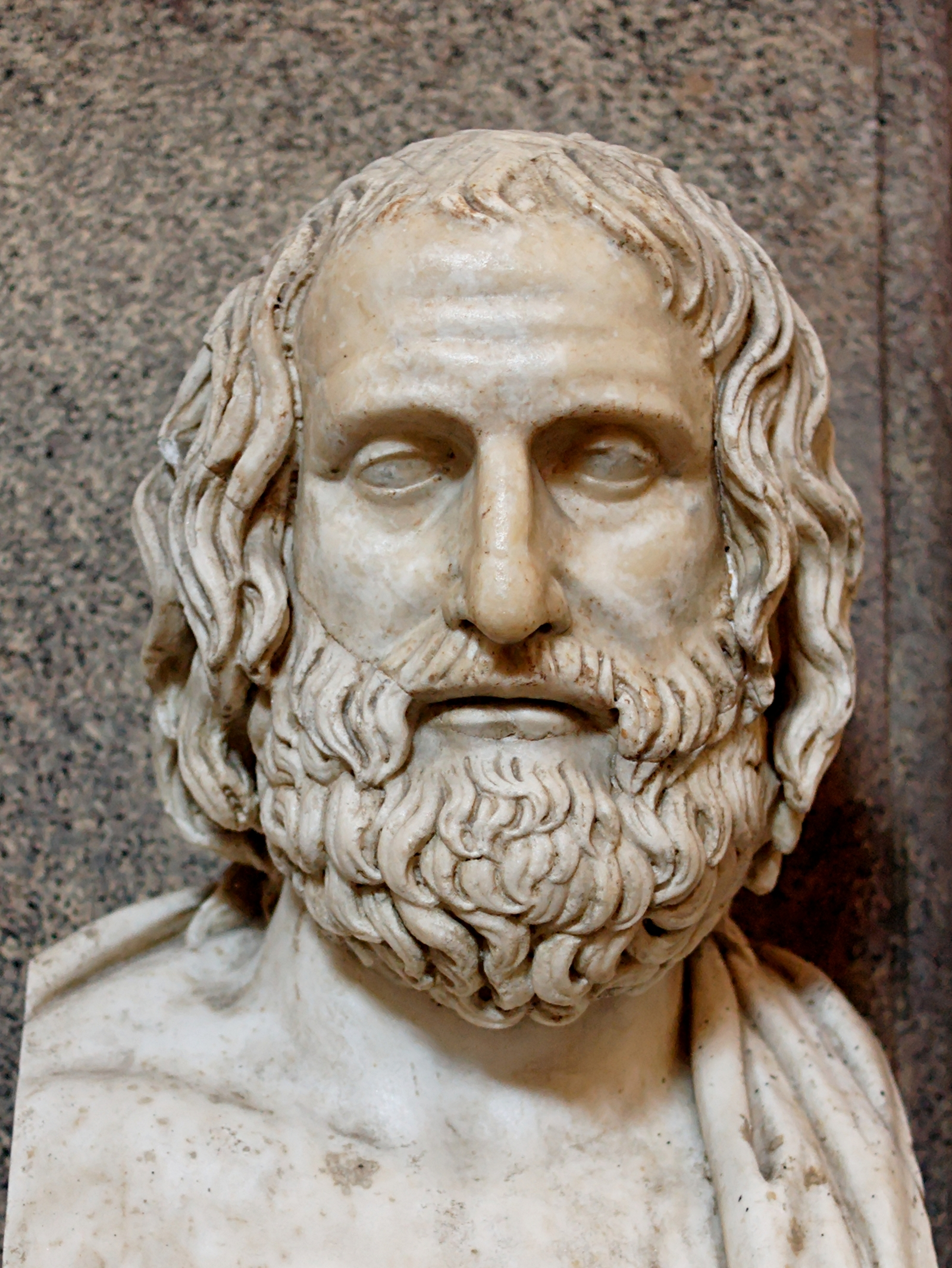
The bust of Euripides, who was hosted by Archelaus

Archelaus was also known as a man of culture and extended cultural and artistic contacts with southern Greece. In his new palace at Pella (where he moved the capital from the old capital at Aegae), he hosted great poets, tragedians, including Agathon and Euripides (who wrote his tragedies Archelaus and The Bacchae while in Macedon), musicians, and painters, including Zeuxis (the most celebrated painter of his time). Archelaus reorganized the Olympia, a religious festival with musical and athletic competitions honoring Olympian Zeus and the Muses at Dion, the Olympia of Macedon. The greatest athletes and artists of Greece came to Macedon to participate in this event. In addition, Archelaus competed and won in Tethrippon in both Olympic and Pythian Games . His participation in the Olympics is disputed by modern scholars because in the same passage that he's presented as an Olympic victor is also presented as a commander of a Macedonian navy that didn't exist.

== Death ==
According to Aelian, Archelaus was killed in 399 BC during a hunt, by one of the royal pages, Crateuas. According to Constantine Paparrigopoulos, there were three accomplices: two Thessalians (Crateuas and Ellanokratis) and one Macedonian, Decamnichos. The latter used to be Archelaus' favorite (Aristotle says all three were, at some point.) However Decamnichos once insulted, in front of Archelaus, the tragic poet Euripides for the smell of the poet's alleged bad breath. This outraged Archelaus who allowed Euripides to flog Decamnichos (or have him flogged) in punishment. Decamnichos was permitted to remain in the court of Archelaus; however, he did not forget about this treatment and thus participated in the killing of his king a few years later. Other versions of the king's death are reported by differing sources.

== Sources ==
Archelaus Argead dynasty Born: ? Died: 399 BC
Royal titles
Preceded by Perdiccas II	King of Macedon; 413–399 BC	Succeeded by Orestes
