= Cultural depictions of Alexander the Great =

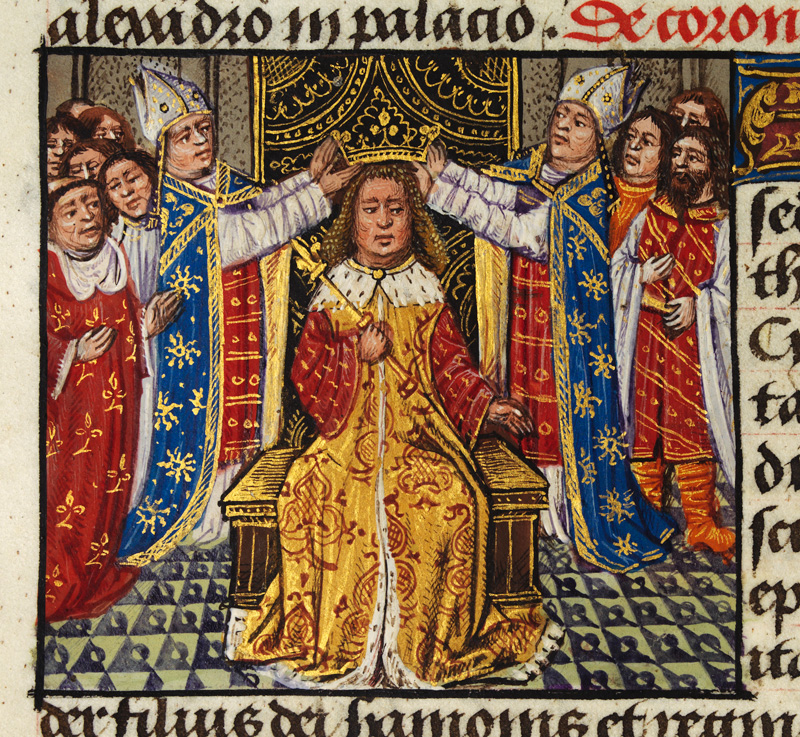
The coronation of Alexander depicted in medieval European style in a 15th-century English-Flemish illuminated manuscript containing the romance The History of Alexander's Battles.

Alexander the Great's accomplishments and legacy have been preserved and depicted in many ways. Alexander has figured in works of both high culture and popular culture from his own era to the modern day. Some of these are highly fictionalized accounts, such as the Alexander Romance.

== Cities ==
Around twenty towns or outposts were founded by Alexander the Great. Some of the main cities are:

- Alexandria, Egypt
- Alexandria Ariana, Afghanistan
- Alexandria in the Caucasus, Afghanistan
- Alexandria on the Oxus, Afghanistan
- Alexandria Arachosians, Afghanistan
- Alexandria on the Indus, Pakistan
- Alexandria Bucephalous, Pakistan
- Alexandria Eschate (The Furthest), Tajikistan
- Charax Spasinu (Alexandria), Iran
- İskenderun (Alexandretta), Turkey
- Kandahar (Alexandropolis), Afghanistan
- Iskandariya (Alexandria), Iraq
- Alexandropolis Maedica, first city founded by Alexander the Great

The Italian city of Alessandria is not named for Alexander the Great but for Pope Alexander III. However, the Medieval choice of this name was likely influenced by the example of the above cities. Alexandroupolis in Eastern Macedonia and Thrace is not named for Alexander the Great but for Alexander I. However, Alexandreia, Greece and Megas Alexandros, Pella in modern Greek Macedonia are named after Alexander the Great.

=== As city planner ===
By selecting the right angle of the streets, Alexander made the city breathe with the etesian winds [the northwestern winds that blow during the summer months], so that as these blow across a great expanse of sea, they cool the air of the town, and so he provided its inhabitants with a moderate climate and good health. Alexander also laid out the walls so that they were at once exceedingly large and marvelously strong.

— Diodorus Siculus, Library of History, Volume VIII

== Ancient and medieval literature ==
Alexander and Augustus depicted in a Byzantine style painting from 1568. Written on the left is 'Alexander, King of the Hellenes' and 'Augustus, Emperor of the Romans' on the right. From the Katholikon of Docheiariou Monastery, Mt. Athos, Greece.

=== In Persian literature ===
Alexander is mentioned in the Zoroastrian Middle Persian work Arda Wiraz Nāmag as gizistag aleksandar ī hrōmāyīg, literally "Alexander the accursed, the Roman", due to his conquest of the Achaemenid Persian Empire and the burning of its ceremonial capital Persepolis, which was holding the sacred texts of Zoroastrianism in its Royal Archives. The book Arda Wiraz Nāmag was written in the late period of Sassanid Persian Empire, when the rivalry with the Romans was intense.

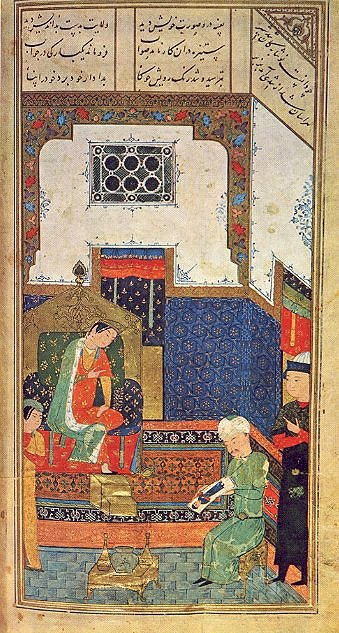
15th century Persian miniature painting from Herat depicting Iskander, the Persian name for Alexander the Great.

The Shahnameh of Ferdowsi, one of the oldest books written in New Persian, has a chapter about Alexander. It is a book of epic poetry written around 1000 AD, and is believed to have played an important role in the survival of the Persian language in the face of Arabic influence. It starts with a mythical history of Iran and then gives a story of Alexander, followed by a brief mention of the Arsacids. The accounts after that, still in epic poetry, portray historical figures. Alexander is described as a child of a Persian king, Daraaye Darab (the last in the list of kings in the book whose names do not match historical kings), and a daughter of Philip, a king. However, due to problems in the relationship between the Persian king and Philip's daughter, she is sent back to Rome. Alexander is born to her afterwards, but Philip claims him as his own son and keeps the true identity of the child secret.

His name is recorded as both Iskandar (اسکندر) and Sikandar (سکندر) in Classical Persian literature.

He is known as Eskandar-e Maqdūnī (اسکندر مقدونی "Alexander the Macedonian") in modern Iranian Persian.

They say that, once upon a time, the pious Zartosht made the religion, which he had received, current in the world; and till the completion of 300 years, the religion was in purity, and men were without doubts. But afterward, the accursed evil spirit, the wicked one, in order to made men doubtful of this religion, instigated the accursed Alexander, the Roman, who was dwelling in Egypt, so that he came to the country of Iran with severe cruelty and war and devastation; he also slew the ruler of Iran, (6) and destroyed the metropolis and empire, and made them desolate.

— Book of Arda Viraf, I 1.1–6.

=== In the Qur'an ===
Alexander in the Qur'an often is identified in Islamic traditions as Dhul-Qarnayn, Arabic for the "Two-Horned One", possibly a reference to the appearance of a horn-headed figure that appears minted during his rule and later imitated in ancient Middle Eastern coinage. Accounts of Dhul-Qarnayn in the Qur'an, and so may refer to Alexander. Noteworthy is the fact that his favorite horse was named Bucephalus, which means "ram's head", alluding to the shape of a horned ram at its forehead.

=== In the Bible ===
Alexander is discussed in the first Book of the Maccabees, a deuterocanonical text. The Book starts by recounting Alexander's conquest of Judea.

=== Other references ===
The Kandake has a portrait of Alexander secretly painted, from the Trebizond Alexander Romance

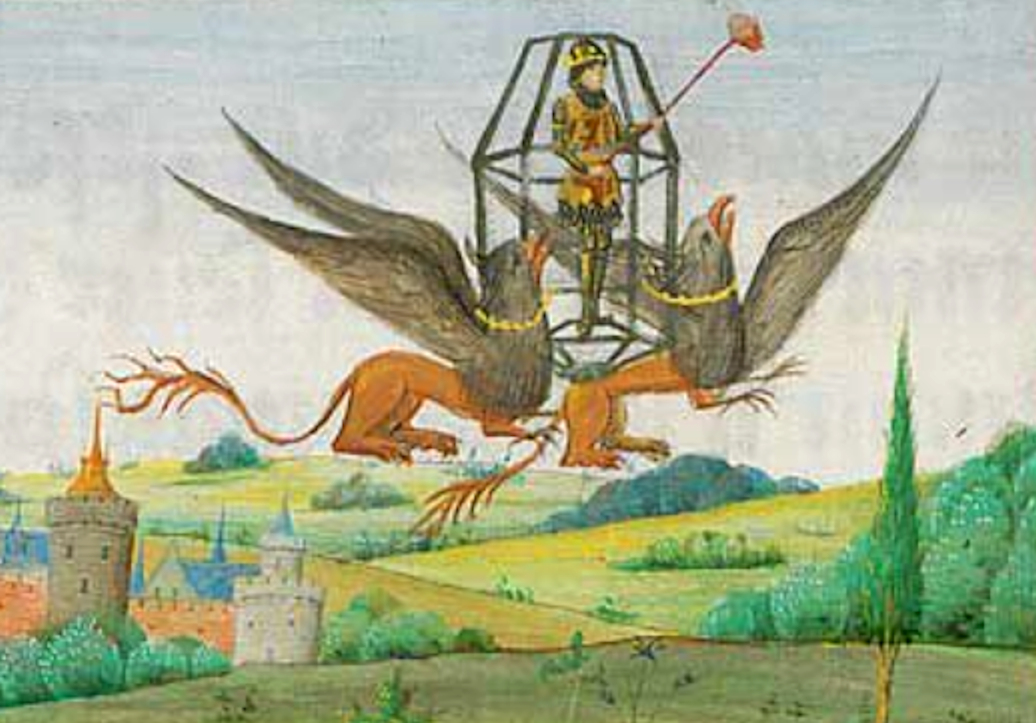
Alexander the Great conquering the air. Jean Wauquelin, Les faits et conquêtes d'Alexandre le Grand, Flander, 1448-1449.

He is known as al-Iskandar al-Makduni al-Yunani ("Alexander the Macedonian Greek") in Arabic, אלכסנדר מוקדון, Alexander Mokdon in Hebrew, and Tre-Qarnayia in Aramaic (the two-horned one, apparently due to an image on coins minted during his rule that seemingly depicted him with the two ram's horns of the Egyptian god Ammon), الاسكندر الاكبر, al-Iskandar al-Akbar ("Alexander the Great") in Arabic, سکندر اعظم, Skandar in Pashto.

Alexander is one of the two principals in most versions of the Diogenes and Alexander anecdote.

Dante talks well about him in the Convivio and De Monarchia; the position of Alexander in the Divine Comedy, though, is more uncertain, for though there is a reference to an Alexander being punished in the Circle of the Violent (Canto XII), it is not explicit as to whether this is in fact Alexander the Great himself. Alexander, however, is notably absent from Dante's depiction of virtuous pagans (Canto IV).

== Modern literature ==
- Alexandre le Grand, tragedy in five acts by Jean Racine, first staged 1665.
- In the late 1830s, Letitia Elizabeth Landon wrote three major poems on Alexander, beginning with Death-Bed of Alexander the Great. in 1835, which was followed by The Dream in the Temple of Serapis. 1836 and in 1837 Alexander on the Banks of the Hyphasis., the latter being one of her Subjects for Pictures. She had earlier included her poem Alexander and Phillip. in The Troubadour; Catalogue of Pictures, and Historical Sketches, 1825.
- In 1868 Tchaikovsky contemplated writing an opera featuring Alexander the Great, taking place in Greece and Babylon and centering on the relations between Hebrews and Greeks. The plot would have featured a Jewish woman falling in love with Alexander and for his sake leaving her Jewish lover, who eventually becomes a prophet. However, though surviving Tchaikovsky letters include details of this planned opera, its plot and characters, he finally abandoned this plan and chose instead for an opera with a Russian background.
- Rudyard Kipling's story "The Man Who Would Be King" (1888) provides some glimpses of Alexander's legacy. Made into a movie of the same title in 1975, starring Sean Connery and Michael Caine.
- Dutch writer Louis Couperus' Iskander. De roman van Alexander den Groote (1920) is a historical novel about Alexander after his invasion of Asia. Largely based on the Alexander historians Quintus Curtius Rufus, Arrian, and Plutarch, the novel thematises Alexander's psychological condition during the last years of his life.
- Lord Dunsany's play Alexander (1925) is a dramatization of Alexander's life, with fantastic elements. In this work Alexander encounters the god Apollo and the Queen of the Amazons.
- Alexander appears in "A Trooper of the Thessalians" (1926), a short story by Arthur D. Howden Smith.
- In 1949, Terence Rattigan's play Adventure Story (1949), based on Alexander the Great, premiered in London.
- Robert Payne published a novel in 1954 about Alexander's life, Alexander the God (not to be confused with the Druon novel, below).
- In 1958, Maurice Druon wrote a novel about Alexander, Alexandre le Grand (1958). It was translated into English as Alexander the God (1960) by Humphrey Hare.
- From 1969 to 1981, Mary Renault wrote a historical fiction trilogy on the life of Alexander: Fire from Heaven (1969)(about his early life), The Persian Boy (1972)(about his conquest of Persia, his expedition to India, and his death, seen from the viewpoint of Bagoas, a Persian eunuch and Alexander's eromenos), and Funeral Games (1981)(about the events following his death). Alexander also appears briefly in Renault's novel The Mask of Apollo (1966), and is alluded to directly in The Last of the Wine (1956) and indirectly in The Praise Singer (1978). In addition to the fiction, Renault also wrote a non-fiction biography, The Nature of Alexander (1975).
- Science fiction writer Poul Anderson wrote an alternate history story, "Eutopia" (1967), featuring a timeline where Alexander the Great lived to an old age and established a stable empire that endured to modern times as an enlightened, peaceful and advanced Greek-speaking world culture. Similar "Alexandrian timelines" also appear in several other alternate histories by various writers.
- Ivan Efremov wrote a historical novel Thais of Athens (1972) about the life of hetaira Thaïs, as she follows Alexander in his campaigns. Alexander and Thaïs have a love relationship in the novel.
- French writer Roger Peyrefitte wrote a trilogy about Alexander the great which is regarded as a masterpiece of erudition: La Jeunesse d'Alexandre (1992), Les Conquêtes d'Alexandre (1979) and Alexandre le Grand (1981).
- In Alan Moore's Watchmen, one of the main characters, Ozymandias, goes into detail about how he followed in Alexander the Great's footsteps in order to achieve enlightenment.
- A trilogy of novels about Alexander was written in Italian by Valerio Massimo Manfredi and subsequently published in an English translation, entitled Child of a Dream (1998), The Sands of Ammon (1998) and The Ends of the Earth (1998).
- David Gemmell's Dark Prince (1991) features Alexander as the chosen vessel for a world-destroying demon king. ISBN 0-345-37910-1.
- Judith Tarr's historical fantasy novel Lord of the Two Lands (1993) is about the relationship between Alexander and an Egyptian priestess.
- Steven Pressfield's 2004 book The Virtues of War is told from the first-person perspective of Alexander. Pressfield's novel The Afghan Campaign (2006) is told from the point of view of a soldier in Alexander's army. Alexander makes several brief appearances in the novel.
- In Fate/Zero, the light novel authored by Gen Urobuchi, Alexander (going by the name Iskandar) appears as the Servant Rider, and is referred to as the King of Conquerors.
- In Nicholas Nicastro's 2004 historical novel Empire of Ashes, Alexander's career is described from the perspective of a skeptical Athenian soldier/historian who must debunk Alexander's official divinity to save himself from a charge of sacrilege.
- In the novel by Jonathan Swift, Gulliver's Travels (1726) in part III, chapter VII, Gulliver sees and talks to the ghost of Alexander.
- In the pages of The Haunted Tank from DC Comics, the spirit of Alexander sent the spirit of Confederate General J.E.B. Stuart to protect World War II Lieutenant Jeb Stuart Smith and the light tank M3 Stuart he commands.
- In Tom Holt's comic novel Alexander at the World's End (1999) an impoverished scholar's life is set upon a new course when he becomes Alexander's tutor.

== Television ==
- Alexander the Great (1963), TV series pilot, starring William Shatner as Alexander, directed by Phil Karlson.
- The Search for Alexander the Great (1981) is a 4-part miniseries that chronicles Alexander's life that was distributed by PBS.
- "Eye of Ossiris", a sixth-season episode of MacGyver, is centered around the search for Alexander's tomb and the treasure contained within.
- Alexander Senki (1997), known as Reign: The Conqueror or Alexander in other territories, is an anime TV series, starring Toshihiko Seki as Alexander, directed by Yoshinori Kanemori, and with character designs by Peter Chung. The series is based on the novel Alexander Senki by Hiroshi Aramata, and fictionalizes the life of Alexander.
- The middle episodes of Chanakya, a 1991 Indian TV series based on Chanakya, depicts Alexander's invasion of northwestern India, his death, and the rebellion led by native Indian kingdoms under the leadership of Maurya Empire founder Chandragupta Maurya against Alexander's successors in India.
- The 1996 miniseries Gulliver's Travels, starring Ted Danson, featured a visit from Alexander the Great.
- In the Smallville season 1 episode "Rogue", Lex Luthor shows Clark Kent the armor that Alexander the Great wore in battle. The breastplate is gold, with red and blue diamonds (the colors that represent Superman), and a snake shaped like the letter S.
- In the Footsteps of Alexander the Great (1998), mini-series, hosted by Michael Wood, directed by David Wallace.
- In the miniseries Yu-Gi-Oh! Capsule Monsters, Alexander the Great was the main villain in the Capsule Monster World.
- Alexander was occasionally featured on Histeria!, depicted as a somewhat egotistical man who liked to make it clear that "I'm great! Ha ha!" The first episode to feature him was "Really Really Oldies But Goodies", which featured a sketch about his habit of naming cities after himself, which leads to a scene where World's Oldest Woman gives Toast multiple directions to different cities called Alexandria. In "A Blast in the Past", Alexander consults Sigmund Freud about his past, fretting about the fact that his father always considered him "pretty good" rather than "great". Finally, in "When Time Collides!", Alexander is shown as the reigning champion on a Jeopardy! parody, because all of the correct responses to the answers are centered on him. He even finds a way to win when Charity Bazaar gives the correct response.
- The second season of Spike TV's Deadliest Warrior, which features computer simulated battles between historical warriors, pitted Alexander the Great (portrayed by Jason Faunt) against Attila the Hun, with Attila emerging victorious, with 59.6% of the wins.
- Chandragupta Maurya, a 2011-2012 Indian TV series based on Maurya Empire founder Chandragupta Maurya, depicts Alexander's invasion of northwestern India, his encounter with a young Chandragupta, and Chandragupta's subsequent rivalry with Alexander's successor Seleucus I Nicator.
- Alexander appears several times in sketches in the Horrible Histories TV series. Season 5 featured a stadium rock parody song summarising his life.
- Porus, a 2017 Indian TV series based on the life of Porus, depicts his battle with Alexander, played by Rohit Purohit.
- In the Marvel Studios miniseries Moon Knight, Alexander's tomb is discovered, and it is revealed that Alexander was the last avatar of goddess Ammit.
- Alexander: The Making of a God, a 2024 British docudrama, on the life and conquests of Alexander, released by Netflix. Greek minister of culture Lina Mendoni criticized the series as "Low quality and historically inaccurate".

== Radio ==
- Alexander, a 1993 six-part BBC Radio 4 series by David Wade, which starred Michael Maloney as Alexander.

== Film ==
Date	Title	Country	Notes	IMDb
1941	Sikandar	India	Starring Prithviraj Kapoor as Alexander, directed by Sohrab Modi and depicting Alexander's conquests in northwestern India.	
1956	Alexander the Great	United States / Spain	Starring Richard Burton as Alexander, directed by Robert Rossen, and produced by MGM.	
1965	Sikandar-e-Azam	India	A Hindi-language film, directed by Kedar Kapoor and starring Dara Singh as Alexander, depicts Alexander's battle with the Indian prince Porus.	
1977	Chanakya Chandragupta	India	A Telugu-language film directed by N. T. Rama Rao and stars Sivaji Ganesan as Alexander, depicts Alexander's confrontation with the Indian emperor Chandragupta Maurya.	
2004	Alexander	Germany / United States / Netherlands / France	Starring Colin Farrell as Alexander, directed by Oliver Stone. Based on the biography Alexander the Great (ISBN 0-14-008878-4) by Robin Lane Fox. It was released on November 24, 2004.	
2006	Alexander	Italy	An animated film directed by Daehong Kim, and starring Mark Adair-Rios as the voice of Alexander.	
2010	Young Alexander the Great		Starring Sam Heughan as Alexander, directed by Jalal Merhi. The coming of age of young Alexander, future world conqueror, from his boyhood in Macedonia to his assumption of Regent of the Land. A direct-to-video feature.	

- Baz Luhrmann had been planning to make a film about Alexander, starring Leonardo DiCaprio, but the release of Stone's film eventually persuaded him to abandon the project.

== Music ==
Date	Title	Artist/Group	Notes	Lyrics
1973	"Iskander"	Supersister	This Dutch prog band dedicated a full album to the story of Alexander. Track titles include 'Alexander', 'Dareios The Emperor', 'Bagoas', 'Roxane' and 'Babylon'.	
1986	"Alexander the Great"	Iron Maiden	From the heavy metal album Somewhere in Time. The song describes Alexander's life.	
1998	Alexander the Great's Youth	Nicolas Astrinidis	Oratorio on the early life of Alexander. Thessaloniki, 1998.	
1998	"Alexandre"	Caetano Veloso	Brazilian epic song about Alexander the Great from the album Livro.	
2000	"Alexander the Great"	bond	String quartet release on the album Born.	
2004	Alexander (soundtrack)	Vangelis	original film score of Alexander (2004 film).	
2005	"Alexander the Great"	Iron Mask	Song about Alexander the Great from the album Hordes of the Brave by Belgian band Iron Mask.	
2009	"Iskander Dhul Kharnon"	Nile	Song from the album Those Whom the Gods Detest.	
2013	"Age of Glory"	Serenity	This song, from the album War of Ages, details Alexander's need for conquest while watching his life fade away.	
2016	"Alexander the Great vs. Ivan the Terrible"	Epic Rap Battles of History	This song, part of Epic Rap Battles of History's Season 6, has Alexander face off against the historical leader Ivan the Terrible, among others.	
2025 (2011)	"Megalexander"	Ilias Chrissochoidis	Improvisations from 2011 (electronic music).	

== Video games ==
- Alexander is a character in the computer games Age of Empires and Rise of Nations: Thrones and Patriots.
- Alexander is a leader of the Greeks in five of six games of the Sid Meier's Civilization series, and the leader of Macedon in Civilization VI. He is a lone Greek leader in the original, third and fifth games, a male leader in the second game (the Amazonian queen Hippolyta being the Greek female leader), and the lone leader of the Greek civilization in the fourth game (until Pericles joins him in an expansion pack) and has the leader traits Aggressive and Philosophical.
- In the second Rome: Total War expansion pack, Alexander, Alexander the Great's conquests are chronicled in a campaign and the six battles in the 'Historical Battles' campaign are modeled on Alexander's battles.
- Almost all the battles fought by Alexander appear and are playable in the game Ancient Battle: Alexander, the player can also choose to play against Alexander.
- Alexander the Great is also featured in the game called Rise and Fall: Civilizations at War released by Midway games.
- He is also mentioned in the computer game Age Of Mythology, in the history information text of the unit called Hetairoi.
- Alexander is also mentioned in Age of Empires II during the Saladin campaign and in The Conquerors expansion pack in the Attila the Hun campaign.
- In Stainless Steel Studios' 2001 game Empire Earth, several of the levels in the Greek campaign revolve around Alexander's conquests. He is also depicted on the game's cover.
- In the Chicago level of Tony Hawk's Pro Skater 4, a barber shop is called Alexander the Great Barber shop.
- In the 'Fate' series, Alexander the Great is called the Iskander, King of Conquerors. His spirit is resurrected and becomes a Rider-Class servant used to fight for the prize of the Holy Grail. Iskandar is briefly mentioned in the first visual novel game and anime series Fate/stay night as an example of the Rider-class Servant. It was hinted that he was the most powerful of the characters, but died in a two-versus-one battle. He is detailed in full as Rider in the prequel, Fate/Zero. He is summonable in the game Fate/Grand Order as both Iskander and Alexander (the latter of which represents Alexander as a boy, also a Rider-class Servant).
- In Assassin's Creed II, it is said that a deceased Assassin, Iltani, poisoned Alexander the Great.
- In Assassin's Creed Origins, the player can visit Alexander's tomb.
- In BioShock 2, a now hideously mutated and clinically insane researcher, Gil Alexander, who was a part of Big Daddy production refers to himself as Alex the Great.
- In Dante's Inferno, "the great Alexander" is mentioned as being one that had previously tried to battle his way through Hell.
- In the fashion of Mike Tyson, many of the enemies in the game God Hand will taunt the main character, Gene, by saying "I'm Alexander the Great!" and "You're not Alexander!"
- Several games in the Final Fantasy series feature a being called Alexander that can be summoned in battle and appears as a moving fortress with holy-elemental attacks. While most of these appearances do not seem to be related to the historical Alexander, the MMORPG Final Fantasy XIV: A Realm Reborn, in which he appears as an entire raid dungeon of his own, has made more direct references to Alexander the Great by naming two partitions of the dungeon after Gordias and Midas. An area within Alexander where the player attempts to disable his engine is referred to as the Gordian Knot.
- Alexander is a playable character in the Mobile/PC Game Rise of Kingdoms.
- Alexander is the titular protagonist of the Chronicles: Alexander the Great expansion of Age of Empires II: Definitive Edition. He is also mentioned in the campaign based on Ismail I, who calls himself "zamana ahlining Iskandar" in old Oghuz (Turki-yi Ajami), meaning "Alexander of (my) contemporaries".

== Airports ==
At least two airports have been named after Alexander:

- Kavala International Airport "Alexander the Great", in Eastern Macedonia and Thrace, Greece;
- Skopje International Airport, in the Republic of North Macedonia, named Skopje "Alexander the Great" Airport from 2006 to 2018.

== Other ==
- The official flag, seal and logo of Thessaloniki features the head of Alexander the Great in profile.
- Alexandreia, Greece, previously named Gidas, was officially renamed to Alexandreia in 1953 due to the proximity of the town to the birthplace of Alexander the Great.
- Megas Alexandros, Pella, former municipality in Greek Macedonia.
- Shaun Alexander, of the Seattle Seahawks, is often referred to as "Alexander the Great".
- Alexander Ovechkin, of the Washington Capitals, is often referred to as "Alexander the Great".
- He was depicted on the reverse of the Greek 100 drachmas coin of 1990-2001.
- The 9K720 Iskander, a Russian mobile theater ballistic missile system.
- Secunderabad, a city in India is named after Sikandar Jah, in turn named based on a derivative of Alexander's name.
- In Warhammer 40000, Alexander was one of the identities of the Emperor of Mankind
- Tarbox Strategic Growth Equities, Co., adopted a modified historical image of Alexander as its corporate logo in 2015.
- "Alexander the Great vs. Ivan the Terrible", a 2016 episode of Epic Rap Battles of History, featured Zach Sherwin portraying Alexander in a rap battle against Ivan the Terrible (portrayed by Peter Shukoff) and others.
- The current UFC featherweight champion Alexander Volkanovski's nickname is "The Great", a reference to Alexander the Great's name and his Greek-Macedonian heritage
