= The Nature of Alexander =

1975 book by Mary Renault

- First UK edition
- Author: Mary Renault
- Language: English
- Subject: Biography; Alexander the Great
- Publisher: Allen Lane (UK); Pantheon Books (US)
- Publication date: 1975
- Publication place: South Africa
- Media type: Print – hardcover
- Pages: 240 pages
- ISBN: 978-0-394-49113-4
- OCLC: 1046809
- LC Class: DF234 .R46 1975

The Nature of Alexander (1975) is a nonfiction work by novelist Mary Renault (1905–1983).

== Summary ==
The book is a biography of King Alexander the Great, (356-323 BCE), ruler of Macedon, Egypt and Persia. Renault wrote several historical novels in which Alexander appears: The Mask of Apollo (1966), Fire from Heaven (1969), The Persian Boy (1972) and Funeral Games (1981). She felt these were not enough to tell the whole story of Alexander, and so she completed her nonfiction biography.

The book makes no attempt to be impartial or neutral, but rather unabashedly advocates Alexander as a truly great man. For example, Renault rejects the usual terminology of the "murder" of Kleitos, pointing out that legally, "murder" refers only to killing with premeditation, which absolutely was not the case when the King killed Kleitos in a drunken brawl, after much drink and much provocation. She also points out that the beauty of the mummy of Alexander was still much admired even many generations after his death. She refutes many slurs against Alexander, both ancient and modern. Renault also defends Alexander's friend Hephaistion, pointing out that he corresponded with Aristotle and was successful in every mission and independent command he undertook.

The hardcover edition is illustrated, as is the 1983 Penguin Books softcover edition.

== Editions ==
- 1975. Pantheon Books (New York City). 1st American edition. ISBN 978-0-394-49113-4; ISBN 978-0-394-73254-1.

== See also ==
- 1975 in literature
- Bagoas (courtier)
- Phobos (mythology)
