= Fire from Heaven =

1969 historical novel by Mary Renault

- First edition, 1969
- Author: Mary Renault
- Cover artist: Karl Leabo
- Language: English
- Series: Alexander the Great
- Genre: Historical novel
- Publisher: Pantheon Books
- Publication date: June 1969
- Publication place: United Kingdom
- Media type: Print (Hardback and Paperback)
- Pages: 375pp
- ISBN: 0-394-42492-1
- Followed by: The Persian Boy

Fire from Heaven is a 1969 historical novel by Mary Renault about the childhood and youth of Alexander the Great. It reportedly was a major inspiration for the Oliver Stone film Alexander. The book was nominated for the "Lost Man Booker Prize" of 1970, "a contest delayed by 40 years because a reshuffling of the fledgeling competition's rules", but lost out to Troubles by J. G. Farrell.

== Plot summary ==
Fire from Heaven begins with Alexander as a young child in the court of his father, Philip of Macedon, and closes with the immediate aftermath of his father's assassination at Aegae, the event which led Alexander to assume power. The novel deals with the relationship between Philip and Queen Olympias and Alexander's changing loyalties to them, Alexander's tuition under Aristotle, Alexander's sexuality and relationship with his friend and future General Hephaistion, and Alexander's growing prowess as a soldier during his father's conquest of the Greek states. As a novel concerned with Alexander's youth, it does not deal with his conquest of the Persian Empire beyond foreshadowing.

=== Main locations ===
Pella – the opening scene of the novel, capital city of Macedon. Pella is presented as a place of constant political struggles. It is where Alexander's childhood is spent and where most of the central relationships are formed.

Aigi – the closing scene of the novel, the old capital of Macedon, located higher in the mountains. It features a fortress near a waterfall, and is presented as the site of many important character shifts, such as loss of virginity, murder, and transformative religious experiences.

Mieza – site of a school for Alexander and the other sons of important Macedonian military leaders. Mieza is presented as a sort of Arcadian place of refuge from the wider politics of Macedon, a place of comradeship, learning, and love.

Thrace – Macedon's neighbor to the northeast. Thrace is presented as a wild, remote region which Philip's soldiers have occupied. Even more so than Macedon, Thrace remains a rough land of feuding warlords. It is noted for the blue tattoos of its inhabitants. Thrace is where Alexander first exhibits his military bravery and leadership, and where he and Hephaestion are hardened to the gruesome realities of war.

Athens – Macedon's antagonistic neighbor to the south. Athens is represented in the novel as past its glory days and ruled by petty, squabbling demagogues. It still, however, retains an aura of great respect for both Alexander and Philip as the birthplace of Greece's high culture.

Chaeronea – site of a massive battle which decides whether Philip's military hegemony will be able to spread into the more culturally advanced states of southern Greece.

Perinthos – a former Macedonian ally to the east which wavers in its support and is invaded by Philip. It is here that Alexander and Philip bond over a shared love of military tactics and Alexander saves Philip's life during an attempted insurrection.

Epiros – Macedon's neighbour to the west. Epiros is presented as a well-run, prosperous region in alliance with Macedon. It is the homeland of Olympias, who is daughter and sister of two of its successive kings. The marriage of Olympias to Philip as his chief wife ensures that Epiros remains friendly to Macedon, so that Philip can concentrate his army on northern, southern, and eastern expansion.

Persian Empire – though it is never visited in the novel, Persia is a looming presence affecting everything that happens in Macedon and its neighbors. It is the eventual goal of both Alexander and Philip to conquer Persia and its Great King. Persia is the old enemy invader of Greece and a land of fabled, opulent wealth.

Phocis – though it is never visited in the novel, Phocis serves as the pretext for Philip to become involved in the military disputes of southern Greece. Phocis' sacrilegious cultivation of fields meant to be reserved as holy land (and the resulting wealth which threatens their neighbours) is the impetus for the Third Sacred War.

=== Main characters ===
Alexander – The central character of the novel, followed from the age of 4 until his taking power over Macedon.

Philip – King of Macedon and Alexander's legal father. Alexander and Philip have an intense love-hate relationship. A central theme of the novel is whether Philip, who is often portrayed as arrogant, brutish, and crass, deserves the loyalty and love of Alexander. This is often tied to whether or not Philip is also Alexander's biological father.

Olympias – Alexander mother and Philip's chief wife. She is portrayed as a strong-willed survivor who uses emotional blackmail and a system of spies to protect her interests against her all-powerful husband. Through the novel, Alexander's relationship towards his mother changes from unswerving devotion to a more restrained loyalty.

Hephaestion – Teenaged friend of Alexander who becomes his unswervingly loyal life partner.

Pausanias – Bodyguard and lover of Philip, later elevated to captain of the bodyguards as compensation for a humiliating attack by a rival.

Demosthenes – Athenian political orator, diplomat, and soldier, portrayed as arrogant, selfish, and venal (The strongly negative portrayal of Demosthenes in the novel has been one of the main criticisms leveled against it). Demosthenes is the most visible antagonist against Philip's drive for empire.

Phoinix – Alexander's pedagogue, who provides him emotional solace and imaginative inspiration.

Leonidas – Olympias' uncle and Alexander's great-uncle. Leonidas serves as regent of Macedon during one of Philip's absences and seeks to toughen Alexander into an obedient, hard soldier.

Attalos – One of Philip's generals. Early in the novel he attacks Pausanias as part of a romantic quarrel of honor. Later in the novel, he makes a bid for power by trying to replace Olympias with his own niece as mother of the next king.

Antipatros – Loyal regent during one of Philip's absences, Antipatros helps train Alexander in the civic demands of state administration. He is also the father of Kassandros, who is a minor villain in the story.

=== Chapter One ===
The novel begins with the memorable opening line, "The child was wakened by the knotting of the snake's coils about his waist." Alexander is four years old and his younger sister Kleopatra is still in a cradle. The snake which encircles him is a semi-tame house snake who has escaped from the room of Alexander's mother, Olympias. Alexander sneaks past his nanny, Hellanike, and into his mother's room to return it. The relationship between Alexander and Olympias is portrayed as affectionate and intimate, but he is already aware at a young age that she lies to her husband, Alexander's purported father, Philip, the king of Macedon.

Philip, who had been heard earlier singing and yelling drunkenly in the main hall, bursts into the cozy scene & embarrasses Alexander with his nakedness and verbal abuse of Olympias. Olympias responds with mockery of Philip's other lovers, his period as a hostage in Thebes, and the insinuation that Alexander is in fact not Philip's biological son. Phililp throws Alexander from the room, where he is comforted by a guard. Alexander claims he will murder his father when he's old enough, but the guard warns that it would be a sin, and tells Alexander that being abused will toughen him up for the aristocratic male rites of passage of murdering a wild boar and murdering a man. The guard also tells Alexander the tale of Heracles killing snakes as a baby, starting a lifelong fascination with Heracles in Alexander.

Alexander's family is further revealed when, three years later, he goes on a horse ride with a soldier he admires, Ptolemy. Alexander has heard around the barracks that Ptolemy is also the son of Philip, but Ptolemy explains to Alexander why this should not be repeated, as Ptolemy's mother is married to someone other than Philip. To overcome Alexander's great disappointment, Ptolemy becomes a blood brother with him.

Returning to the stables, Alexander sees horses dressed in the dazzling wealth of Persia. He learns that two Persian satraps who rebelled against the Great King have been given pardons and will be returning from exile in Macedon. Alexander entertains and questions the envoys who have come to bring them back, gaining useful military information because the amused envoys tell a child more than they would an adult. Alexander also flirts with the handsome youth who attends the envoys, and later dreams of riding off with him to see Persepolis after murdering a group of impudent Persian envoys.

The final sequence of Chapter One ends with Alexander allowed to join his mother in a women's rite dedicated to the god Dionysus because Alexander has not yet reached puberty.

=== Chapter Two ===
When Philip goes to war against Chalkidike, he puts Olympias' cold uncle, Leonidas of Epirus in charge as regent, and entrusts him with finding tutors for Alexander, who is now seven years old and considered ready to begin training for manhood. Leonidas forces Alexander into a Spartan lifestyle and the tutors try to tame Alexander's imagination into rote learning. Conditions are somewhat alleviated by an old family friend, Lysimachus of Acarnania, who encourages Alexander's dreams by referring to Alexander as the mythical hero Achilles and himself as Phoinix. In his mind, Alexander equates his father with Achilles' military colleague but personal enemy, Agamemnon.

Alexander has his first meeting with Hephaestion, although it is brief and they argue.

Philip returns from war, bringing crowds of slaves with him. He also marries a woman from Thrace to seal an alliance, causing mad jealousy in Olympias. In retaliation, Olympias appears on stage in a celebratory play, something which is allowed her as a priestess of Dionysos, god of theatre, but is still considered wildly shocking since only men are supposed to appear on stage. In the gossiping crowd afterward, Alexander slashes the leg of a man who he hears insulting his mother. To atone for attacking someone without warning, Alexander sacrifices to Zeus, and believes that the god speaks directly to him during the rite.

=== Chapter Three ===
Alexander is ten years old. Going to meet with his father, he notes that his father's newest guard, Pausanias of Orestis, has the kind of looks which Philip appreciates in lovers. Philip is preparing to hear envoys from Athens, who are coming to convince him against joining a war against Phocis, because they are afraid of his increasing power spreading into southern Greece. Chief among them is Demosthenes, who attempts to molest Alexander, mistaking him for a slave. Alexander is revenged when he reveals himself as Philip's heir just as Demosthenes is about to speak. Demosthenes is also humiliated because his speech is plagiarized by another envoy, Aeschines.

Alexander befriends a young Thracian, Lambaros, living at the court as a hostage, despite the snobbery which the other Macedonians display toward him.

=== Chapter Four ===
Alexander learns eagerly from his tutors, and bemoans the fact that he must sleep when there is so much he wants to do. His music teacher, Epikrates, encourages him to perform due to his great skill on the cithara, but Philip publicly humiliates Alexander for being too good a musician. Epikrates resigns, and Alexander runs away from home. He joins a soldier on leave in a tribal feud in the uplands of Macedon, making his first murder in battle and carrying the head of the victim back to prove his manhood to his father. Alexander refuses to claim the head of a second kill because the face reminds him of his father.

Returned to the palace, Alexander is given his own retinue of young men-at-arms. At a yearly horse fair, when Alexander is away from them looking at horses, the group gossips that King Philip had taken the guard Pausanias of Orestis as a lover, but then had moved on to someone else. Pausanias had insulted the new lover in jealousy, leading the new lover to be foolishly brave in battle to try to prove himself, and resulting in his death. To get back at Pausanias, the general Attalos, a friend of the dead man, had got Pausanias drunk and let the stable grooms gang rape him. Philip had promoted Pausanias to captain of the royal bodyguard to try to make it up to him, but had not punished Attalos, who was good general.

Alexander shows amazing courage and skill in taming the horse Bucephalus in front of the assembled chiefs at the horse fair. He re-meets Hephaestion (who he had first met six years previous) and is smitten. Alexander realizes that while talking with Hephaestion, he had forgotten all about running to tell the news of the new horse to his mother, the first time this has happened when he had big news to tell. Alexander burns a great deal of Persian incense to Heracles at a rite and is told by his great-uncle Leonidas not to be so wasteful of Persian riches until he is master of the lands where they grow, a sentiment which Alexander takes to heart.

=== Chapter Five ===
Alexander is nearly 15 and is studying the military histories of Xenophon. When they are hiding out together on a rooftop, Alexander convinces Hephaestion to climb to a dangerously high pinnacle. Hephaestion, who has become completely infatuated, likens Alexander to Zeus, and himself to Semele, realizing that a relationship with Alexander will always involve danger.

Philip leaves to install Alexandros, Olympias' brother, as the new king of Epirus, placing the loyal Antipatros as regent of Macedon. Alexander receives his new tutor, Aristotle, who sets up a school for Alexander and the sons of Philip's generals at Mieza. Among the comrades are Hephaestion, who is now accepted as Alexander's "shadow" by everyone, Ptolemy, Harpalos, Philotas, and Kassandros, whom Alexander does not like, but he must be included because he is the heir of the loyal regent Antipatros. At one point, they watch a play about Achilles and Patroclus, which further inspires the bond between Alexander and Hephaestion.

After some time at the school at Mieza, Alexander and his closest comrades are called to join Philip in besieging a fort. A military escort is led by Kleitos, brother of Alexander's former nanny, Hellanike. Alexander fights with great bravery, and interacts personally with the soldiers, earning their admiration. After the fall of the fort, he rescues a woman whose baby has been murdered, and whom Kassandros was attempting to rape. In an ensuing fight, the woman nearly kills Kassandros, and he is packed off home in disgrace. Alexander visits his boyhood friend, the former Thracian hostage Lambaros, on the return trip.

Back at school, the young men are shocked to hear of the torture and death of Hermias of Atarneus, a friend of Aristotle and loyal ally of Macedon, under arrest in Persia. Aristotle refers to all Persians as barbarians in anger, an insult which Alexander refuses to believe. Meanwhile, Philip deposes Kersobelptes of Thrace.

Alexander's family is reunited at the springtime Dionysia, held at the old capital at Aigai. His mother is jealous that Alexander and Philip have now bonded through their common passion for war. Caught up in the heterosexual furor surrounding the Dionysia, Alexander flirts with a serving woman, Gorgo, but later comes upon his father having sex with her. On the day of the festival, he watches the secret rites of the women on the mountaintop, although it is forbidden, and sees his mother murder Gorgo in her role as priestess of Dionysos. Sick with shame for having watched something forbidden, Alexander reasons that his mother has the right to wage war in the way of women just as his father does in the way of men, and that Olympias has actually killed far fewer people than Philip. Hephaestion comforts Alexander after the shock, and is relieved that Alexander did not have sex with any of the women returning from the mountain rites, as many of their friends did.

=== Chapter Six ===
The next spring, Alexander and Hephaestion finally have sex. It is something which Hephaestion has been longing for, but it leaves Alexander distant because, like sleep, it reminds him that he is mortal. When they return to the capital from school, the circle of men around Alexander are noticed to have taken up the southern Greek fashion of shaving, something which Philip views with distaste. Nonetheless, he leaves Alexander as regent when he goes off to war against Perinthos and Byzantion.

As regent, Alexander practices military skills himself and studiously trains the soldiers left to him, making them ready when he puts down a rebellion in Thrace. He is aided by his childhood friend, Lambaros, who knows the local terrain. Upon driving off the rebels, Alexander founds the city of Alexandropolis Maedica and then joins his father against Perinthos. There, he saves his father's life but Philip, ashamed, pretends to have been unconscious and to not remember it, losing some of the loyalty he had earned from Alexander in their shared battle plans.

On his return to the capital, Alexander is pressured by his mother, who is jealous of Hephaestion's influence, to engage in heterosexuality. He is kind to a hetaira at a party, but goes no further than kissing her gently. His mother then has a young woman smuggled into his room at night. Realising that the woman will be punished if she does not prove she has lost her virginity, and wanting his mother off his back, Alexander has sex with her. The next morning he sends the woman back to his mother with an expensive pin which Olympias had told Alexander to save for his bride someday, and the message that from now on he will choose his own lovers.

=== Chapter Seven ===
Philip decides that southern Greece must be invaded. Alexander is put in charge of a feint against Illyria to make the southern Greeks unprepared. Back at Pella, he questions his mother as to who is his biological father, but the novel leaves the answer a secret. Athens and Thebes ally against Philip. Sparta remains uninvolved. The Athenian army and the Sacred Band of Thebes are destroyed, with Alexander's courage and tactical skill making him a hero to the army. Philip's hegemony is recognised. Alexander represents Philip in Athens, where he is insulted when someone tries to offer him service from an enslaved sex worker. His blood brother and friend Ptolemy, however, takes up with the Athenian hetaira Thaïs.

On the way back to Pella, Philip's entourage stays at the castle of Attalos, the general who had years before planned the gang rape of Pausanias of Orestis, the chief of Philip's bodyguard. Alexander is shocked that his father is insulting Pausanias by making him stay the night at the home of his former rapist, but Ptolemy points out that the king has much else to think about and has probably put the event long out of mind. Pausanias does not eat or drink the entire time they are lodged at the home of Attalos.

Attalos gains another enemy in Olympias when it is announced that Philip will be marrying Attalos' niece. The marriage threatens Olympias even more than Philip's previous marriages because a son born to this wife would be completely Macedonian, and might be considered a better heir than Olympias' own son, Alexander. Alexander goes along with the wedding until Attalos prays that his niece will produce a "lawful, true-born heir" which Alexander takes as an insult and threat. He hurls a cup at Attalos' head, a huge offence against a host, then goes with his mother into exile in her native Epirus. Along the route of their flight, they take refuge at the house of Pausanias' wife. In Epirus, Alexander consults the oracle of Dodona, under the auspices of three priestesses reminiscent of the Moirai, and is given the answer of "yes" to two questions which the novel leaves a secret.

=== Chapter Eight ===
Through the mediation of Demaratos, Alexander and Olympias return to Macedon, but there is now a clear faction which supports them, and a second faction which supports Attalos. Philotas, one of the young men in Alexander's circle, is recruited by his father, the general Parmenion, to spy on Alexander for Philip. Olympias' own spies learn that Philip plans to marry Arridaios, the developmentally disabled son of a minor wife, off to the daughter of a ruler on the edge of the Persian Empire. Convinced that the prestigious marriage is meant as a slight to him, Alexander proposes himself to the foreign ruler as an alternate bridegroom through the secret negotiations of Thettalos, an admiring actor.

When he learns that Alexander has gone behind his back, Philip exiles several of the men who helped in the plot, including Ptolemy, whom Philip acknowledges to be his biological son. Hephaestion is not exiled, but is threatened with death if Alexander ever again commits an act seen as treasonous. Thettalos is brought before Philip in chains, and Alexander is forced to plead for his life.

Fed up with Olympias, Philip makes plans to marry her daughter, Kleopatra, off to Olympias' brother, the current king of Epirus. This will allow Philip to divorce Olympias while still retaining a marriage bond to the king of Epirus. About the same time, captain of the bodyguard Pausanias learns that Philip has brought up mention of his former rape again, although he had promised never to do so. The internal divisions of the family begin to spread out into the network of diplomats and spies working against Philip in occupied lands. Olympias hints at a new intrigue she has developed to bolster her position, but, fearful of Philip's retribution, Alexander refuses to hear it.

Alexander and Hephaestion both look ahead to the planned invasion of Asia, reasoning that if Alexander fights well for Philip, he will get back in his good graces. And if Philip dies in battle, then the best center of power will be with the mass of the army. Alexander plans to murder Attalos in Asia. Foreign agents convince Pausanias that Alexander agrees to a plot involving the captain of the guard by making a copy of one of Alexander's rings and using it as a token of agreement.

Meanwhile, Philip invites dignitaries from all over Greece for the lavish wedding of his daughter Kleopatra to Alexandros of Epirus. He sends for an oracle from Delphi concerning his invasion of Asia and receives the seemingly positive response, "Wreathed is the bull for the altar, the end fulfilled. And the slayer too is ready." Lavish floats of gods and goddesses are built to parade into the theatre where the wedding celebration will take place, with Philip named a god in addition to the Twelve Olympians. Feeling on top of the world, Philip decides to enter the stadium without his guards.

As Pausanias helps Philip from his horse, he stabs the king, then is cut down himself by other guardsmen. Everyone in the crowd, except Olympias, panics and flees the theatre. It is hinted that she and Antipatros may have been privy to the assassination. The float holding Aphrodite, goddess of love, is toppled in the panic. Alexander takes control of the guard, setting himself in position to claim the throne by the next novel in the series, The Persian Boy.

== Literary significance and criticism ==
The novel has been criticised as an overly romanticised and sanitised portrait of Alexander, who is shown as exceptionally athletic, beautiful, charismatic, and talented, as well as relatively compassionate for his time. Renault's portrayal of Alexander's society, however, has been noted for its historical accuracy and sound scholarship in "dealing realistically but unsensationally with the life and mores of the Hellenic world..." Gene Lyons noted in the New York Times Book Review, that, "As a historical novelist writing about the ancient world, Mary Renault has few peers." Fire From Heaven was followed by two sequels, The Persian Boy (1972), dealing with Alexander's conquest of the Persian Empire, and Funeral Games (1981), depicting the consequences of his death.

Renault's portrayal of the demagogue Demosthenes has been observed to be unusually unsympathetic. Typically regarded as one of the great Athenian orators, Renault's Demosthenes is cowardly, self-interested and vengeful.

Renault is sometimes criticised for writing female characters who are either helpless or ruthless, or both. Daniel Mendelsohn said that both her "contemporary and the Greek novels feature unsettling depictions of bad marriages and, particularly, of nightmarishly passive-aggressive wives and mothers." Renault's unsympathetic mother characters have attracted particular attention. In this respect Fire from Heaven is typical. The two major female characters are Kleopatra (Alexander's sister) and Queen Olympias (Alexander's mother). Kleopatra's role is largely passive: Alexander has affection for her, but is not influenced by her, and Kleopatra has little control over her future - although Renault has Kleopatra feel frustration at how little control over her life she has in comparison to Alexander. Queen Olympias is more active, a power player at the Macedonian court and in Alexander's life, but a markedly unsympathetic character: an affectionate mother to Alexander, but manipulative, unstable, and - through her enthusiastic participation in Dionysiac ritual as imagined by Renault - homicidal.

Daniel Mendelsohn praises Mary Renault's transliteration of proper Greek names with 'k' rather than 'c' - Kleopatra, Boukephalas - as a stylistic choice which makes her writing more closely resemble ancient Greek script. He writes that it 'gives her pages just the right, spiky Greek look. As a result of this minute attention to stylistic detail, the novels can give the impression of having been translated from some lost Greek original.'
