= Caeria =

Illyrian queen

Caeria (died 344/343 BC), was an Illyrian queen who reigned in the second part of the fourth century BC.

Cynane, a Macedonian princess and daughter of Philip II of Macedon and Audata of Illyria, engaged in battle with Caeria in 344/343 BC. An account cites that Cynane accompanied her father when this happened during his campaign in Illyria. Caeria was killed by Cynane in a hand-to-hand combat with a blow to the throat, and with great slaughter, her army was also defeated.

== See also ==
- List of rulers of Illyria
