= Linda Proud =

British author of historical fiction (born 1949)

Linda Proud (born 1949) is a British author of historical fiction. She is best known for The Botticelli Trilogy, which is set in late fifteenth-century Florence.

== Early life and career ==
Proud was born in Hertfordshire and was an only child. As a young girl, she enjoyed making up stories, and at age 14 she discovered the historical fiction of Mary Renault. Renault would become one of her chief influences as a writer.

Proud began her career as a picture researcher in 1971, during which time she developed an interest in the works of Florentine painter Botticelli. She also became interested in and influenced by the work of Renaissance philosopher Marsilio Ficino. It was during this time that she developed the idea behind The Botticelli Trilogy and began researching Renaissance Florence. However, after the digitization of images, she left her career as a picture researcher to begin teaching creative writing to American students at the University of Oxford. She also served as an editor for literary consultancy The Writers Workshop.

== Writing career ==
Proud's early work primarily included non-fiction books on culture, spirituality, and art. Her first fictional publication, Knights of the Grail (1995), is a retelling of the Arthurian legend for children.

Proud finished A Tabernacle for the Sun (1997, 2005), the first volume of her trilogy, which was published through Allison & Busby. A Tabernacle for the Sun was long-listed for the Mann Booker Prize (1997) and won a Southern Arts bursary and a Hawthornden Castle Fellowship.

In 2000, Proud and her husband founded their own publishing house, Godstow Press, which specializes in publishing works on art and spirituality. All her subsequent historical fiction, including the next two volumes of her trilogy, Pallas and the Centaur (2004, 2012) and The Rebirth of Venus (2008), has been released under the imprint of Godstow Press. After finishing her trilogy, it was suggested to Proud that she write a book about Cosimo de' Medici, and in 2012 she published A Gift for the Magus, which serves as a prequel to The Botticelli Trilogy. A Gift for the Magus won a second prize Indie B.R.A.G. Medallion and the Quagga Prize for Independent Literary Fiction. It was also marked as an Editors' Choice book by the Historical Novel Society.

Altogether, the process of writing The Botticelli Trilogy took over thirty years. Proud bases much of her writing closely on primary sources. Her writing has been compared to H. F. M. Prescott, Mary Renault, and Marguerite Yourcenar.

In recent years, Proud has lectured on Renaissance philosophy and questioned the boundaries between historians and novelists in History Today. She has also written several articles and reviews for Resurgence & Ecologist. She also leads regular writing workshops and gives talks on writing and publishing.

In September 2018 she marked a departure from the Renaissance with the publication of a novel, Chariot of the Soul, set in Britain on the eve of the Roman invasion.

== Personal life ==
Proud lives in Oxfordshire with her husband. She is a student of Neoplatonism and Advaita Vedanta, the latter of which she practices on a daily basis.

== Bibliography ==
=== Non-fiction ===
- Consider England, illus. Valerie Petts (Shepheard-Walwyn, 1994), ISBN 0-85683-145-X
- Designing with Photographs, with Peter Bonnici (Rotovision, 1998), ISBN 978-2880463533
- 2000 Years: Christianity in England (Pitkin, 1999), ISBN 0-85372-932-8
- Icons: A Sacred Art (Pitkin, 2000), ISBN 0-85372-990-5
- Angels (Pitkin, 2001), ISBN 1-84165-041-2

=== Fiction ===
==== Children's literature ====
- Knights of the Grail (Good Company for Children, 1995; St. James Publishing, 2003), ISBN 1-903843-16-2

==== The Botticelli Trilogy ====
- A Tabernacle for the Sun (Allison & Busby, 1997; Godstow Press, 2005), ISBN 978-0-9547367-2-9
- Pallas and the Centaur (Godstow Press, 2004, 2014), ISBN 978-0-9547367-0-5
- The Rebirth of Venus (Godstow Press, 2008), ISBN 978-0-9547367-6-7
- A Gift for the Magus (prequel) (Godstow Press, 2012), ISBN 978-1-907651-03-8

Ancient Britain

- Chariot of the Soul (Godstow Press, 2018) ISBN 978-1-907651-13-7
