= Funeral Games (novel) =

Novel by Mary Renault

- First US edition
- Author: Mary Renault
- Language: English
- Series: Alexander the Great
- Genre: Historical novel
- Publisher: Pantheon Books (US); John Murray (UK)
- Publication date: November 1981
- Publication place: United Kingdom
- Media type: Print (hardback & paperback)
- Pages: 335pp
- ISBN: 0-394-52068-8
- OCLC: 7554791
- Dewey Decimal: 823/.912 19
- LC Class: PR6035.E55 F8 1981
- Preceded by: The Persian Boy

Funeral Games is a 1981 historical novel by Mary Renault, dealing with the death of Alexander the Great and its aftermath, the gradual disintegration of his empire and the start of the Wars of the Diadochi. It is the final book of her Alexander trilogy.

== Synopsis ==
The chapters of the book have the years of the events for their titles:

- 323 BC. Alexander the Great dies in Babylon. Perdikkas seeks to be appointed as Regent for the king's yet-unborn heir. Meleager wants Arrhidaios acclaimed as king. The dispute threatens to become a civil war. Roxane murders the daughters of Darius and their unborn children. Perdikkas becomes Regent, with both Phillip Arrhidaios and Alexander IV (son of Roxane) as nominal joint kings. Ptolemy I Soter and Bagoas reach an agreement. The Greeks revolt; Antipatros crushes them.
- 322 BC. Perdikkas crushes the Isaurians. Bagoas visits Ptolemy in Alexandria, and together they advance their plans for relocating the mummy of Alexander to that city. The daring plan is carried out, and the Mummy and golden bier of Alexander are relocated to Alexandria. Kynna and Eurydike receive news of the death of Alexander and decide it is imperative that Eurydike marry Phillip Arrhidaios (as pre-arranged) and so advance her claim to the throne. Alketas murders Kynna, but Eurydike survives, and marries Arrhidaios (the marriage is celebrated but not consummated).
- 321 BC. Eumenes defeats and kills Krateros (more commonly known as Craterus.) Perdikkas marches towards Egypt, seeking to depose Ptolemy, but the invasion is a total disaster. Perdikkas is assassinated by his own lieutenants. Eurydike seeks to become Queen on her own right, but she is frustrated by the inconvenient arrival of her menstrual period. Peithon and Arridaios/Arybbas become the new co-regents.
- 320 BC. Under the leadership of Ptolemy, Alexandria becomes the largest city in the world, surpassing Babylon. Egypt prospers greatly.
- 319 BC. In the spring, Antigonos One-Eye defeats Eumenes and drives him eastward. In the summer, the aged regent Antipatros dies. He passes over his own son Kassandros (whom he knows to be cruel and much too ambitious, likely to seize the throne for himself) and appoints his elderly colleague Polyperchon as his successor as regent of Macedon.
- 318 BC. Olympias appeals for help from Eumenes. Eumenes dedicates a royal tent to the spirit of great Alexander, complete with golden throne, golden crown, and golden scepter. In the power struggle taking place in Greece following the death of Antipater, Phocion is deposed as the ruler of Athens, convicted of treason, and executed by Athenians hoping to restore democracy to the city.
- 317 BC. In the spring, with an army and navy supplied by Antigonos, Kassandros (Cassander) crosses the sea and takes Athens unopposed. Polyperchon, with king Arrhidaios in tow, marches against him. Roxane, with her son, flees to join Olympias in Dodona in Molossia. Eurydike, infuriated at being left behind from the southern war, seizes the Regency for herself, with the help of Kassandros, his brother Nikanor, and their whole clan. Polyperchon sends Arrhidaios back to Eurydike. Olympias invades Macedon. The Macedonians refuse to fight against Alexander's mother. Olympias deposes, imprisons and tortures Eurydike and Arrhidaios. On hearing this, Kassandros delays and slows down his march to Macedon. Olympias murders Arrhidaios and forces Eurydike to commit suicide.
- 316 BC. Olympias is executed, in a Biblical-style stoning, by the relatives of her victims.
- 315 BC. Kassandros visits the Lyceum in Athens and tells them monstrous slanders against Alexander.
- 310 BC. Kassandros murders Roxane and Alexander IV.
- 297 BC. Kassandros dies a horrible death from disease.
- 286 BC. Pharaoh Ptolemy completes writing a book to refute the evil lies of Kassandros.

== Characters ==
All human characters are actual historical individuals, unless otherwise noted.

- Alexander the Great, king of Macedon, Emperor of Persia, Pharaoh of Egypt. He dies in the first chapter of the book but nevertheless remains the main character.
- Alexander IV, presumed (though disputed) son of Alexander the Great. King (in name only) of Macedon and Asia.
- Alketas, brother of general Perdikkas. Assassin of Kynna. More commonly known as Alcetas.
- Amyntas, already dead as the novel starts, but important as the husband of Kynna and father of Eurydike.
- Antigonos, usually called "Monophtalmos", but "One Eye" (same meaning) in Funeral Games. Satrap (governor) of Phrygia, and later founder of the Antigonid dynasty.
- Antipatros, more commonly known as Antipater, regent of Macedon, too proud and too loyal to seize the throne for himself. Father of Kassandros.
- Aristonous, staff officer of Alexander the Great. Later loyal to Alexander IV.
- Arrhidaios, also known as Phillip Arrhidaios and Philip III. King, in name only, of Macedon and of its empire. He has epilepsy and some sort of mental retardation.
- Arybbas, Macedonian nobleman, famous for designing and building Alexander's magnificent funeral chariot. His name was actually Arridaios, but Renault changed his name, for the purposes of the novel, to a similar Epirote name to avoid confusion with king Phillip Arrhidaios.
- Badia, one of three fictitious characters (the others are Kebes and Konon) invented by Renault for the purposes of the novel. The former chief concubine of Persian king Artaxerxes Ochos, she is persuaded by Roxane to join a murderous conspiracy.
- Bagoas, the beloved of the late Alexander, who helps Ptolemy relocate Alexander's mummy to Alexandria.
- Darius III, Great King of Persia, assassinated by his own generals after he twice ran away from Alexander. Already dead as the novel begins. His real name was Daryavaushas.
- Demetrios, son of Antigonos, only a teenage boy at the time of the novel, but later king of Macedon (294–288), and known as the Besieger of Cities – Athens, Munychia and Rhodes were among the cities he besieged. He failed to capture Rhodes. He lived from 337 to 283 BCE.
- Drypetis, younger daughter of king Darius III and widow of Hephaistion.
- Eos, whose name means "dawn". He is a big beautiful white-furred hunting hound, and he is chosen to be the sacrificial victim in a ceremony to reconcile the various Macedonian factions that have been fighting after the death of Alexander the Great. The feeble-minded king of Macedon, Phillip Arrhidaios, is very fond of Eos and objects strenuously to the sacrifice, disrupting the ceremony, with serious consequences for world history.
- Eumenes, General and Chief Secretary of Alexander the Great.
- Eurydike or Eurydice, also known as Adeia. Daughter of Kynna (Cynane) and Amyntas. Granddaughter of two kings of Macedon, Philip II and Perdiccas III. Queen by virtue of her marriage to Philip Arrhidaios, she sought to become Queen in her own right. Ambitious, charismatic and courageous, she almost succeeded.
- Hephaistion, close lifelong friend of Alexander. Died a few months before the book opens.
- Iollas, son of Antipatros, brother of Kassandros.
- Kassandros, the villain of the book, who plots to take over the throne of Macedon and to exterminate Alexander's family. Olympias sought to exterminate his family. He was born c. 350 BC (exact date unknown), became king in 305 BC, and died 297 BC. He is more commonly known as Cassander.
- Kebes, tutor to Alexander IV. One of three wholly fictional characters in the book (the others being Badia and Konon).
- Kleopatra, daughter of Philip II and Olympias. Sister of Alexander the Great. Widow of her uncle Alexandros, king of Molossia.
- Konon, one of three entirely fictional characters in the novel (with Badia and Kebes). Konon is a Macedonian veteran assigned to the job of taking care of Phillip Arrhidaios. He feels unwavering loyalty and affection towards his charge.
- Krateros, perhaps the most capable of Alexander's generals. Renault uses this, the correct Greek spelling, but he is more commonly known as Craterus.
- Kynna, Macedonian princess. Daughter of Philip II, widow of Amyntas, mother of Eurydike. She is more commonly known as Cynane. The date of her birth is unknown, but she died in 323 BC or 322 BC.
- Meleagros or Meleager, Macedonian commander of infantry. Enemy of Perdikkas. Places Arrhidaios on the throne, but then is outmanoeuvred and assassinated by Perdikkas.
- Nearchos, Macedonian admiral. Boyhood friend of Alexander the Great.
- Nikanor, brother of Kassandros, betrayer of Eurydike, victim of Olympias.
- Olympias (376 BC to 316 BC), the mother of Alexander the Great. She briefly ruled in Macedon in the interregnum between Eurydike and Kassandros. Her rule was a Reign of Terror. She was killed in a Biblical-style Stoning by the relatives of those she had put to death.
- Peithon, staff officer of Alexander, later of Perdikkas.
- Peukestes, Satrap of Persia.
- Philip II, king of Macedon, father of Alexander, of Kleopatra, of Ptolemy, of Kynna, and of Arrhidaios. He is also grandfather of Alexander IV.
- Polyperchon, Macedonian general who served under both Philip and Alexander. Appointed by Antipater to succeed him as regent of Macedon.
- Ptolemy, also known as Ptolemaios, a general of Alexander who has the gift of knowing his own limitations and resists the temptation of contending for the Imperial Throne. Instead, he gets himself appointed Satrap of Egypt. When the time is ripe, he becomes Pharaoh, founding a new dynasty.
- Roxane, Princess of Bactria (Afghanistan). First wife of Alexander the Great, mother of Alexander IV. Murderer of Stateira and Drypetis.
- Seleukos or Seleucos, staff general of Alexander. Later a king, and founder of the Seleucid Empire.
- Sisygambis, mother of Darius III, whom she disowned because of his cowardice. Adoptive mother of Alexander the Great.
- Theophrastos, successor of Aristotle as director of the Lyceum in Athens. A client of Kassandros, he accepts all the slanderous lies against Alexander that the usurper tells him.

== Reception ==
Writing in The Boston Phoenix, Andy Gaus noted that "Renault's critics would say that the most invented thing in her books is the tone and prevailing attitude, that she describes ancient life as a constant high drama, whose personages, though historical in name, are tailored to fit romantic descriptions, but not to real human proportions. Her critics are not wrong. Her relentlessly one-sided characterizations would be ridiculous if the setting were not so distant and legendary, and the panoramic sweep of the action between exultation and destruction reminds you of those paperback romances with embossed covers and names like Chalice of Passion...Yet it all works and it's hard to say why. On the one hand it seems that the very grandeur of her subject matter elevates her undistinguished narrative voice. On the other hand, her extensive knowledge of all aspects of ancient life--clothing, customs, warfare, trades, religion, language--enables her to create complete, thoroughly detailed scenes out of the bare accounts furnished by Quintus Curtius and Diodorus Siculus."
