= Eurydice II of Macedon =

Macedonian queen (c. 337–317 BC)

Eurydice II Εὐρυδίκη

Queen consort of Macedonia
- Reign: c. 323–317 BC
- Born: Adea c. 337 BC
- Died: 317 BC (aged c. 20)
- Spouse: Philip III
- Father: Amyntas IV
- Mother: Cynane

Eurydice (Greek: Εὐρυδίκη Eurydikē; c. 337–317 BC), often referred to as Adea Eurydice, was the Queen consort of Macedon, wife of Philip III and daughter of Amyntas IV and Cynane.

== Early life ==
The exact year of Eurydice's birth is unknown, but as her uncle Alexander the Great killed her father shortly after Philip II's assassination, it is unlikely that she was born after 335 BCE. There are varying arguments surrounding Cynane's age and year of marriage, with the earliest possible year of Eurydice's birth being 342 BC. Eurydice's birth name was Adea. She was brought up by her mother Cynane.

She accompanied her mother on her daring expedition to Asia to meet Alexander the Great's troops after his death, with the hope of marrying Eurydice to Philip III. Although Cynane was successful in swaying the troops to follow her instead of Alcetas, either he or Perdiccas murdered her. However, the discontent expressed by the troops, and the respect with which they looked on Eurydice as one of the surviving members of the royal house, induced the imperial regent, Perdiccas, not only to spare her life, but to give her in marriage to King Philip Arrhidaeus, Alexander the Great's half-brother and successor to the throne of Macedon. Sources hint that this was an unequal marriage, because the king was disabled mentally. Furthermore, although Philip Arrhidaeus was king of Macedon, this did not make him the imperial successor to Alexander; Alexander had won his empire by law of conquest, and the Asian portion of the empire (more than nine-tenths of the whole) was not part of the people of Macedon. Upon her marriage, Adea changed her name to Eurydice, possibly as a sort of royal title. This name references her maternal grandmother, Audata Eurydice, Philip II's mother, Eurydice I of Macedon, and Perdiccas's mother, reminding the Macedonians of her strong Argead heritage.

== Queen consort of Macedon ==
The sources are again silent as to Eurydice during the life of Perdiccas. After his death in 321 BC, Eurydice, likely still a teenager, again bid for power: she demanded that the new regents of Macedon, Peithon and Arrhidaeus, grant her a share of the regency. Eurydice established herself as the representative of the legitimate line of succession, due to her descent from Philip II and Perdiccas and marriage to Philip III. Her ties to the Macedonian army, and her status as king's wife, helped her gain influence and succeeded briefly in becoming a sort of de facto regent. She may have spoken to the troops in military attire. She took an active part in the proceedings at the Treaty of Triparadisus in 321 BC.

It was at this point, however, that a new adversary, Alexander the Great's general Antipater, returned to the king's court and laid claim to the vacant regency. In an attempt to forestall this and retain command over the Macedonian army, Eurydice spoke in public to the assembled soldiery, who were restless due to Antipater's inability to pay them. Eurydice's speech failed; the Macedonian army decided in favor of Antipater, and the general was appointed regent and guardian of the king.

Eurydice, once again relatively powerless, accompanied her husband and Antipater to Macedon. But the death of Antipater in 319 BC, the more feeble character of Polyperchon, who succeeded him as regent, and the failure of his enterprises in Greece, and above all, the favourable disposition he evinced towards Olympias, determined her again to take an active part: she concluded an alliance with Cassander.

In 317 BC, she deposed Polyperchon. It is possible that she appointed Cassander regent, but she often acted as regent herself. However, Polyperchon joined forces with Olympias. As Cassander was still fighting in the Peloponnese, Eurydice assembled an army and Polyperchon advanced against her from Epirus, accompanied by Aeacides, the king of that country, Olympias, Roxana and the young Alexander IV of Macedon. But the presence of Olympias was alone sufficient to decide the contest: the Macedonian troops refused to fight against the mother of Alexander the Great, and went over to her side. Eurydice fled to Amphipolis, but was seized and made prisoner.

== Imprisonment and execution ==
She was at first confined, together with her husband, in a narrow dungeon, and scantily supplied with food; but soon Olympias, becoming alarmed at the compassion excited among the Macedonians, determined to get rid of her rival. Diodorus provides a dramatic – though perhaps historically inaccurate – narrative surrounding Eurydice's death. In it, Olympias sent the young queen in her prison a sword, a rope, and a cup of hemlock, with orders to choose her mode of death. The spirit of Eurydice remained unbroken to the last; she still breathed defiance to Olympias, and prayed that she might soon be requited with the like gifts. Having given proper burial rite to her husband to the best of her ability, she put an end to her own life by hanging herself with her own girdle, without giving way to a tear or word of lamentation. Some scholars use her murder to explain why the Macedonians betrayed Olympias.

Her body was later removed by Cassander. In 316 BC, he organized a splendid funeral, complete with funeral games, for Eurydice, Philip, and Cynane, who had been killed six years earlier. Eurydice's body was interred, together with that of her husband, in Aegae.

== Discovery of Tomb II ==
In 1977, Manolis Andronikos discovered the Great Tumuli and excavated the tombs there. Tomb II is generally considered to be the burial site of Philip II of Macedon and Cleopatra Eurydice of Macedon. However, certain scholars argue that it is actually the tomb of Eurydice and Philip III. This is supported by the presence of 4th century ceramic objects in the tomb and Asian architectural and artistic features in Tomb II suggesting a date after Alexander's conquests, as well as evidence that Philip II, Cleopatra, and their daughter Europa were buried in Tomb I. Additionally, the presence of military items and Amazonian imagery near the female's burial site imply that she was buried as a warrior, though some scholars argue that the weaponry is in honor of the male and there is no evidence that Eurydice ever fought on the battlefield.
