= The Charioteer =

1953 novel by Mary Renault

- First edition cover
- Author: Mary Renault
- Language: English
- Genre: War novel Gay literature
- Publisher: Longman
- Publication date: 1953
- Publication place: United Kingdom
- Media type: hardback
- Pages: 399

The Charioteer is a romantic war novel by Mary Renault (pseudonym for Eileen Mary Challans) first published in London in 1953. Renault's US publisher (Morrow) refused to publish it until 1959, after a revision of the text, due to its generally positive portrayal of homosexuality. The Charioteer is significant because it features a gay protagonist and romantic story with a happy ending, the first book traditionally published in England to do so. It quickly became a bestseller – particularly within the gay community, and remains a cult classic.

== Plot summary ==
This romance novel is primarily set in 1940 during the immediate post-Dunkirk period of World War II at a military hospital in England during nightly bomb raids and blackouts. The story's protagonist, Laurie (Laurence) 'Spud' Odell, is a young soldier wounded at Dunkirk who must decide if his affections lie with a younger conscientious objector working at his hospital or a naval officer whom he had 'worshiped' when they had both been pupils at an all-boys boarding school and with whom he has suddenly been reconnected.

The conscientious objector, Andrew Raynes, is a young Quaker, as yet unaware of his own sexuality, who is working as an orderly at the military hospital where Laurie is being treated. Ralph Lanyon, who commanded the Merchant Navy ship which evacuated Laurie from Dunkirk, was Laurie's boyhood hero at school, but he was expelled for a sexual incident with another boy (Hazell). He is sexually experienced and an established member of the homosexual sub-culture of the nearby city.

Laurie must come to terms with his own nature as well as the two different aspects of love characterised by Andrew and Ralph: the 'pure', asexual nature of his love for Andrew; and the sexual satisfaction of his love for Ralph. The novel derives its title from the Chariot Allegory employed by Plato in his dialogue Phaedrus, in which the soul (the charioteer) must learn to manage the two aspects of love, the black horse representing the lustful side of love, and the white horse representing the altruistic side of love.

Circumstances eventually force Laurie to choose Ralph over Andrew, giving Andrew up rather than force him into conflict with his religious beliefs and his still-unresolved sexuality. There is altruism on Ralph's side too as he is prepared to sacrifice himself rather than stand in Laurie's way and force him into his own lifestyle of covert sexuality and 'specialisation'. (Note: Chapter 6: "The party had warmed up by this time. A momentary detachment came upon Laurie as he looked on. After some years of muddled thinking on the subject, he suddenly saw quite clearly what it was he had been running away from; why he had refused Sandy‘s first invitation, and what the trouble had been with Charles. It was also the trouble, he perceived, with nine-tenths of the people here tonight. They were specialists. They had not merely accepted their limitations, as Laurie was ready to accept his, loyal to his humanity if not to his sex, and bringing an extra humility to the hard study of human experience. They had identified themselves with their limitations; they were making a career of them. They had turned from all other reality, and curled up in them snugly, as in a womb.")

== Characters ==
- Laurence "Laurie" Patrick ("Spud") Odell: the main character, aged 23; injured at Dunkirk and sent to a temporary hospital in the country – obviously near Bristol (called Bridstow in the novel)
- Ralph Ross Lanyon: A couple of years older than Laurie and formerly the head prefect at Laurie's boarding school; he was expelled following a 'sex scandal', joins the merchant navy, and then the Royal Naval Volunteer Reserve during the war where he loses several fingers on one hand while captaining the boat that brought the wounded Laurie back from Dunkirk; one of Laurie's love interests
- Andrew Raynes: Laurie's other love interest; a young Quaker and conscientious objector who works at the hospital at which Laurie is a patient
- Reg Barker: Laurie's friend – another wounded soldier at the hospital
- Madge Barker: Reg's wife who has an affair
- Nurse Adrian: a nurse at the hospital at which Laurie and Reg are patients
- Lucy Odell: Laurie's mother
- Michael Odell: Laurie's father, deceased. An Irish reporter who died of alcoholism and pneumonia when Laurie was 6.
- Gareth Straike: the man Laurie's mother re-marries
- Bunny: Ralph's partner and former flatmate
- Alec Deacon: a trainee doctor, friend and ex-partner of Ralph
- Sandy Reid: also a trainee doctor and Alec's current partner
- Dave: an older Quaker who also works at the hospital and is the unofficial leader of the conscientious objectors working as orderlies; long-time family friend of Andrew. He had, at least, an 'infatuation' with Andrew's father (Bertie) before both of them got married

== Reception and critical analysis ==
Renault is concerned that homosexual men be fully integrated members of society and do not try to exist in a ghetto of their own making, as exemplified by the party ("part-brothel, part lonely hearts club") (Note: Chapter 14: "I don‘t just mean that queers would be there. A queer party: something between a lonely hearts club and an amateur brothel.") at which Ralph and Laurie are reunited. In Ralph, Renault creates a tarnished hero with the potential to be a noble warrior (she alludes to Plato's Symposium, in which a character philosophizes about an army composed of male lovers), whom Laurie, who has not yet lost his youthful idealism, can redeem. The hope is that Laurie and Ralph can build a meaningful long-term relationship rather than a life of only sexual gratification.

During the war Renault had been trained as a nurse and worked for several months at the Winford Emergency Hospital in Winford just outside Bristol (which had a fairly large contingent of conscientious objectors working as orderlies). The story's wartime setting enabled Renault to consider issues such as how gay men could be valued and useful members of society, to 'make out as a human being' (Note: Chapter 16: "Good luck to you, Spud. We always agreed that right, left or centre, it is still necessary to make out as a human being. I haven't done it but you will.") as she expresses it, whilst still remaining true to their nature. Renault's other earlier novels also had gay themes (primarily lesbian) but in her subsequent novels, Renault turned away from the 20th century and focused on stories about male lovers in the warrior societies of ancient Greece. Thus she no longer had to deal with modern gay issues and prejudices, and was free to examine the nature of male love and heroes as the object of love.

David Sweetman, Renault's biographer, notes that some reviewers linked the book to the growing movement for reform of the laws against homosexuality in Britain and 'even drew the support of the Church of England's official newspaper'. Anthony Slide noted that The Charioteer was a bestseller within the gay community. Michael Bronski called the novel "an outright plea for the tolerance of homosexuals" and praised it as "sincere and well-written."

The Charioteer was not ranked among the top 100 gay and lesbian novels compiled by The Publishing Triangle in 1999. However, the site's visitors voted it their Number 3 (out of 100).

The Charioteer has been almost constantly in print since its publication and continues to influence readers even after over 60 years. and

In 2013 the book was re-issued by Virago Press as one of their Modern Classics series with an introduction by Simon Russell Beale.

The Charioteer was published in Spanish in 1989 – translated by María José Rodellar – with the title El Auriga and into Greek in 1990 with the title Ο Ηνίοχος.

In 2008, a fan created their impression of the trailer for a (never made) movie of the novel.
