= North Face (novel) =

1948 British romance novel

North Face: A Novel
- First edition
- Author: Mary Renault
- Language: English
- Genre: Romance
- Set in: Cornwall
- Publisher: William Morrow & Co. (US); Longmans Green and Co (UK)
- Publication date: 1948 (US); 1949 (UK)
- Publication place: New York City, New York (US); London, England (UK)
- Media type: Print (hardcover)
- Pages: 280 (US); 317 (UK)
- OCLC: 1320731

North Face is a contemporary heterosexual romance novel by Mary Renault, published in 1948. It was her fifth novel. Renault became famous for historical novels set in ancient Greece and featuring homosexual love between male characters.

== Plot summary ==
The novel is set in the period immediately after the end of World War II. The protagonists are Neil Langton and Ellen Shorland, both of whom have tragic pasts and both of whom are staying at a boarding house in Cornwall. They both have a passion for mountain climbing, which is what first brings them together. Neil is in the process of obtaining a divorce from an adulterous wife, whilst mourning the death of his young daughter, and Ellen is mourning the loss of her first love Jock, a pilot who died in the war, believing herself incapable of loving again.

== Reception ==
Donald Barr in a 1948 review for The New York Times, after criticizing modern romance novels, says that "North Face, however, has moments when one feels that one is witnessing love in its tenderest and purest form—how old-fashioned those adjectives are!—and at the same time it is treated in a rigorously analytical manner. Never does the name do service for the thing. It is marvelous that Miss Renault's analysis does not destroy its subject, but it does not." He also observed that "The minor characters... are superbly done... these figures of envy and jealousy are not treated as mere appurtenances to the main story, but one feels that they might easily, with a suitable change of emphasis, become the central figures of a novel themselves."

From the Introduction by Sarah Dunant (2014) in the Virago Modern Classics edition:

In her fifth novel North Face (1949) nursing becomes character rather than plot. Inside a love story between two guests in a Yorkshire [sic] boarding house after the war, Renault uses two women in their thirties as a kind of sparring Greek chorus, ruminating on the morality (or not) of the affair. Already very much professional spinsters, one is a desiccated prissy academic, while the other is a blowzy, more down-to-earth professional nurse. Though the satire is at the expense of them both (at times they are more entertaining than the rather laboured love story), the nurse at least feels in touch with life. If Mary Renault had ever considered academia, this is surely her verdict on the choice she made.
