= The Persian Boy =

1972 novel by Mary Renault

- First US edition
- Author: Mary Renault
- Illustrator: Michelangelo (cover detail)
- Language: English
- Series: Alexander the Great
- Genre: Historical novel
- Publisher: Longman (UK); Pantheon Books (US)
- Publication date: 23 October 1972 (UK); 15 November 1972 (US)
- Publication place: United Kingdom
- Media type: Print (Hardback and Paperback)
- Pages: 410 (UK), 419 (US)
- ISBN: [[Special:BookSources/0-582-10542-0 (UK); 0-394-48191-7 (US)|0-582-10542-0 (UK)<br />0-394-48191-7 (US)]]
- OCLC: 369921
- Dewey Decimal: 823/.9/12
- LC Class: PZ3.R2913 Pe PR6035.E55
- Preceded by: Fire from Heaven
- Followed by: Funeral Games

The Persian Boy is a 1972 historical novel by Mary Renault. It is the second book in her trilogy about Alexander the Great, following Fire from Heaven (1969) and preceding Funeral Games (1981). The story is narrated by Bagoas, a Persian noble who is enslaved and castrated as a boy and later becomes a courtier to Darius III and lover to Alexander during the Macedonian conquest of the Persian Empire.

The book was a commercial success and became a bestseller within the gay community after its release.

== Plot ==
Bagoas is born into an aristocratic Persian family. After his father is killed in a political plot, Bagoas is captured, castrated, and sold into slavery. He is bought for the court of King Darius III, where he is trained in courtly manners and becomes the king's favourite. After Alexander defeats Darius, the Persian nobleman Nabarzanes presents Bagoas to Alexander as a gift.

At 16, Bagoas enters a relationship with the 25-year-old Alexander and stays with him until Alexander dies seven years later. Through Bagoas's eyes, the novel covers the later part of Alexander's campaigns. These events include the conquest of Bactria, disputes with Macedonian officers over Alexander's adoption of Persian court customs such as proskynesis, his marriage to Roxana, the invasion of India, and the march across the Gedrosian Desert. The novel also follows the relationship between Alexander, Bagoas, and Alexander's close companion Hephaistion, ending with Hephaistion's sudden death and Alexander's own fatal illness in Babylon.

== Historical background ==
The historical Bagoas is mentioned briefly in surviving classical texts. The Roman historian Quintus Curtius Rufus describes him as a handsome eunuch who was intimate with both Darius and Alexander. Plutarch also records an occasion when Alexander's soldiers cheered and shouted until Alexander embraced and kissed Bagoas during a festival.

In her author's note, Renault discusses how she built Bagoas's character from these sources and addresses conflicts in the ancient accounts. Curtius depicts Bagoas as a spiteful schemer who framed a Persian noble named Orsines for robbing royal tombs after Orsines failed to give him gifts. Renault rejects Curtius's version as "muddled sensationalism", citing other classical accounts that describe Orxines as corrupt and arguing that royal Persian tombs did contain rich offerings. She also connects Plutarch's story of the army cheering Bagoas to the period just after the Gedrosian Desert crossing, suggesting that Bagoas had won the troops' respect by helping wounded men during the march.

== Reception ==
Upon release in 1972, Kirkus Reviews called The Persian Boy "a superb historical novel" and praised Renault for balancing historical detail with personal intimacy. Writing in The Guardian in 2014, Sam Jordison described the book as an accessible classic that successfully uses a Persian narrator to examine Alexander's rule.

In a review of Renault's Alexander trilogy, historian Jeanne Reames praised Renault's knowledge of ancient geography and her ability to make Greek and Persian perspectives understandable to modern readers. However, Reames criticized Renault's overly idealized portrait of Alexander, arguing that it relied too heavily on the early 20th-century historian William Woodthorpe Tarn. She also noted that while Alexander's attraction to Bagoas is historically recorded, there is no evidence that Bagoas held the level of personal or political influence over Alexander shown in the novel, a role historians usually assign to Hephaistion.

== Sequel ==
Bagoas returns in a smaller role in Funeral Games (1981), the final novel in Renault's Alexander trilogy. In that book, an older Bagoas helps Ptolemy divert Alexander's funeral procession to Egypt to support the founding of the Ptolemaic dynasty in Alexandria.
