= Demaratus (hetairos) =

Demaratus (Greek: Δημάρατος) was a Corinthian prominent amongst the pro-Macedonians and connected by hospitality with the family of Philip II of Macedon. It was through the mediation of Demaratus that Alexander was able to return home from Illyria. (Alexander had left Macedon for Illyria following his quarrel with his father after the marriage of Philip to Cleopatra Eurydice.)

Demaratus was almost certainly present in Aegae when Philip was assassinated in 336 BC, and in 334 BC he accompanied Alexander on the Asiatic expedition as one of his hetairoi. He is said to have wept with joy to see Alexander seated on Darius' throne at Susa. Demaratus died shortly before the Indian campaign; his remains were sent back to Corinth with appropriate honours.
