= Alcetas =

4th-century BC Macedonian general

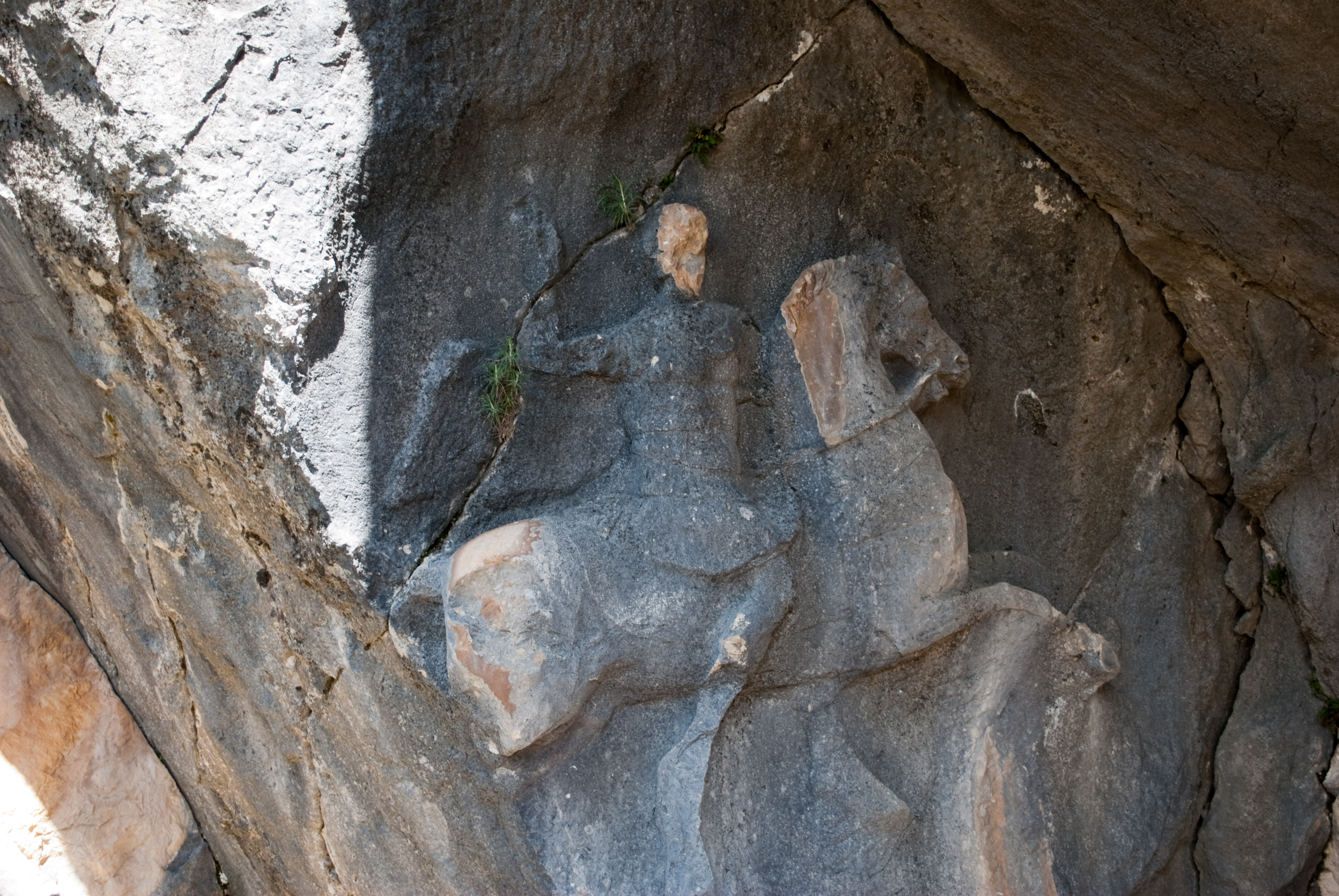
Relief of a horseman from the so-called "Tomb of Alcetas" in Termessos (modern Turkey)

Alcetas (Greek Ἀλκέτας; died 320 BC) was the brother of Perdiccas and the son of Orontes from Orestis. He is first mentioned as one of Alexander the Great's generals in his Indian expedition.

On the death of Alexander, Alcetas was a strong supporter of his brother Perdiccas. At Perdiccas' orders, in 323 BC Alcetas murdered Cynane, the half-sister of Alexander the Great, as she wished to marry off her daughter Eurydice to Philip Arrhidaeus, the nominal king of Macedon.

At the time of Perdiccas' murder by his own troops in Egypt in 321 BC, Alcetas was with Eumenes in Asia Minor engaged against Craterus. The Perdiccas' army revolted from him and joined Ptolemy. They condemned Alcetas and all of Perdiccas' supporters to death.

The war against Alcetas, who had now left Eumenes and united his forces with those of Attalus, was waged by Alexander's general Antigonus. Alcetas and Attalus were defeated at the Battle of Cretopolis in Pisidia in 320 BC and Alcetas retreated to Termessos. At this time, Antigonus came and set up camp in front of the city, seeking delivery of his rival. Not wanting their city to be dragged into disaster for the sake of a Macedonian foreigner, the elders of the city decided to hand Alcetas over to Antigonus. However, the youths of Termessos wanted to keep their word and refused to go along with the plan. The elders sent Antigonus an envoy to inform him of their intent to surrender Alcetas. According to a secret plan to continue the fight, the youth of Termessos managed to leave the city. Learning of his imminent capture and preferring death to being handed over to his enemy, Alcetas killed himself. The elders delivered his corpse to Antigonus. After subjecting the corpse to all manner of abuse for three days, Antigonus departed Pisidia leaving the corpse unburied. The youth, greatly resenting what had happened, recovered Alcetas' corpse, buried it with full honours, and erected a beautiful monument to his memory.
