= Nabarzanes =

Persian commander (died c. 330 BC)

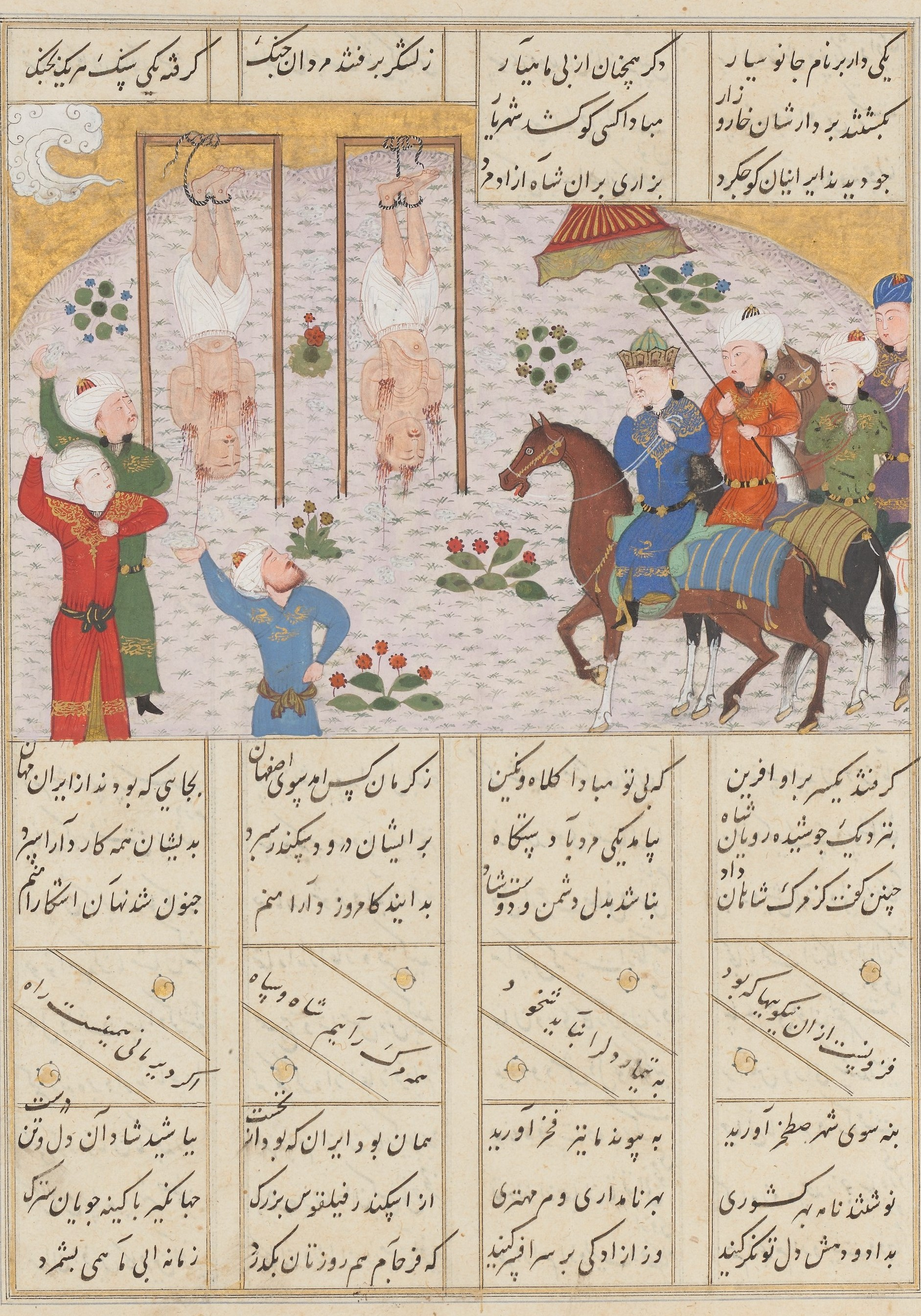
Alexander Executes Janusiyar and Mahiyar (Nabarzanes).

Nabarzanes (died c. 330 BC) was a high-ranking Persian commander, who served as the chiliarch of the royal cavalry of the Achaemenid King of Kings Darius III (r. 336–330 BC).

Following the Persian defeat against the Macedonian king Alexander the Great (r. 336–323 BC) at the Battle of Gaugamela in 331 BC, Nabarzanes conspired against Darius III with other Persian grandees, such as Bessus, the satrap of Bactria, and Barsaentes, the satrap of Arachosia-Drangiana. Together they arrested Darius III in mid-330 BC, with Bessus being chosen as the leader of the Achaemenid forces, probably due to his Achaemenid descent. The arrest of Darius III gave Alexander the pretext of avenging him. Fleeing from the pursuing Macedonian forces, Bessus and the rebels carried Darius III in a covered wagon, reportedly in golden chains. In order to buy some time for their escape, Bessus and his co-conspirators killed Darius III and left his body by the road. Bessus then appointed Nabarzanes the satrap of Hyrcania and Parthia, which were under one administrative unit. When Alexander approached Nabarzanes, he surrendered and was pardoned with the help of Bagoas. Nabarzanes then went back to Hyrcania, but was arrested by Phrataphernes, who had him sent to Alexander, where he was seemingly executed.

The 2nd-century Greek historian Arrian describes a "Barzanes" as the person appointed satrap of Parthia by Bessus. Modern scholars consider this a corruption of the text, and believe he is describing Nabarzanes.

Nabarzanes appears in the 11th-century Persian epic Shahnameh under the name of Mahyar. Seeing as they are in a hopeless position, Mahyar along with Janusipar/Janushyar (Bessus) murders Dara II (Darius III) and then attempt to negotiate with Iskandar (Alexander), eventually meeting up with him. Following the funeral of Dara, Iskandar has Mahyar and Janusipar executed.

== Sources ==
- Briant, Pierre (2015), Darius in the Shadow of Alexander, Harvard University Press, ISBN 978-0674493094
- Heckel, Waldemar (2006). Who's Who in the Age of Alexander the Great: Prosopography of Alexander's Empire. Blackwell Publishing.
- Heckel, Waldemar (2020). In the Path of Conquest: Resistance to Alexander the Great. Oxford University Press. ISBN 978-0190076689.
- Weiskopf, Michael (1989). "Bessos". In Yarshater, Ehsan (ed.). Encyclopædia Iranica. Vol. IV/2: Behruz–Bibliographies II. London and New York: Routledge & Kegan Paul. pp. 174–175. ISBN 978-0-71009-125-3.
- Wiesehöfer, Josef (2006). "Nabarzanes". In Salazar, Christine F.; Landfester, Manfred; Gentry, Francis G. (eds.). Brill's New Pauly. Brill Online.
