= Lysimachus of Acarnania =

Lysimachus of Acarnania (Greek: Λυσίμαχος, Lysimachos) was one of the tutors of Alexander the Great. Though a man of very slender accomplishments, he ingratiated himself with the royal family by calling himself Phoenix, and Alexander Achilles, and Philip Peleus; and by this sort of flattery, according to Plutarch, he obtained the second place among the young prince's tutors.
