= Bagoas (courtier) =

Eunuch in the court of the Persian Empire

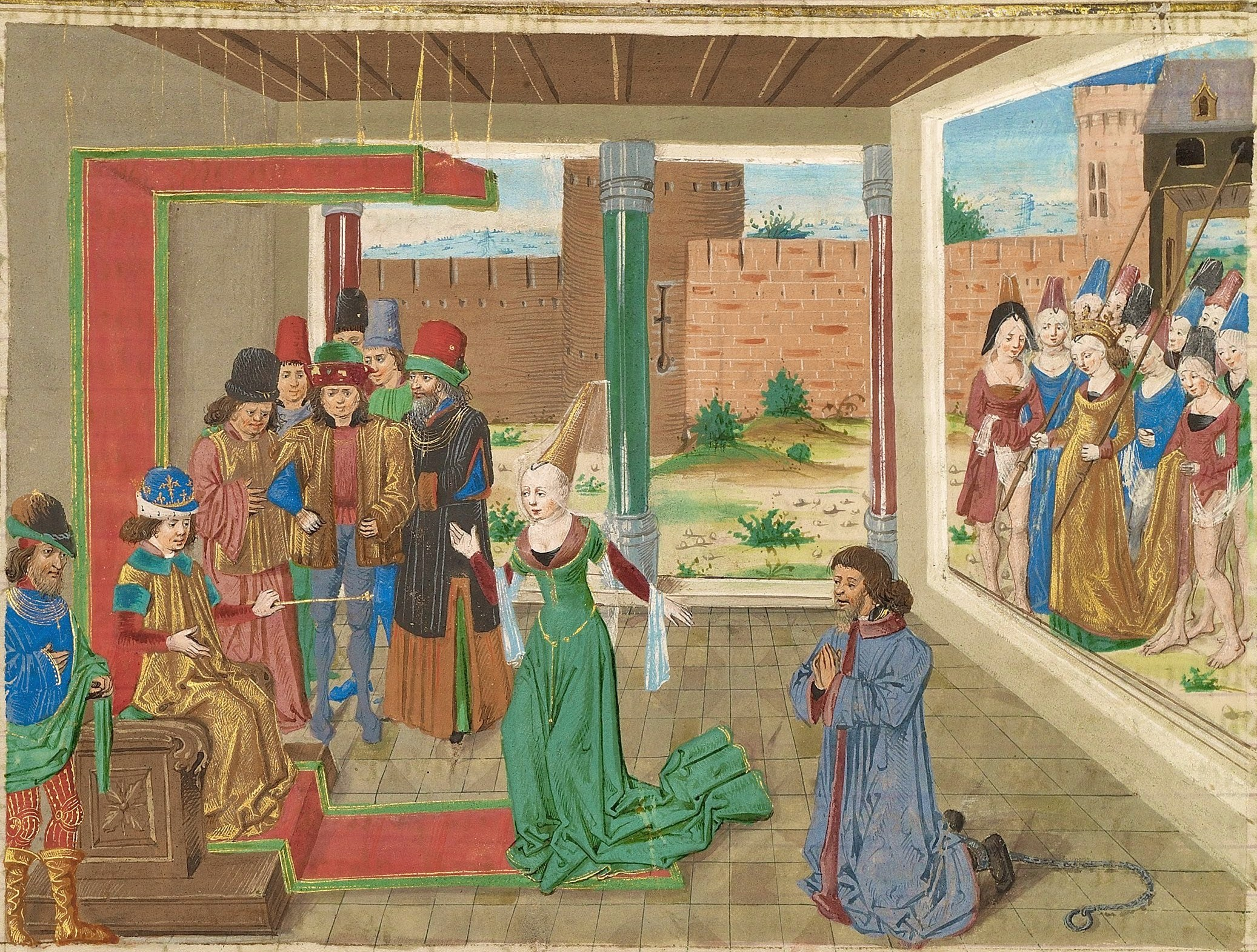
Bagoas pleads on behalf of Nabarzanes, by Master of the Jardin de vertueuse consolation and assistant (Flemish, active 3rd quarter of 15th century). (1450–1475)

Bagoas (Old Persian: Bagāvahyā; Ancient Greek: Βαγώας, Bagōas) was a eunuch in the court of the Persian Empire in the 4th century BC. According to ancient sources, Bagoas was a courtier and lover of Darius III, (Note: "Bagoas, an Eunuch, who was in the flower of his Youth, and had been familiarly us'd by Darius formerly, and was now by Alexander..."Rufus 1714, p. 331, Book VI, Chapter V) and subsequently of Alexander the Great.

== Historiography ==
Bagoas is mentioned in three surviving sources and is distinct from Bagoas the Elder, who attempted to assassinate Darius III. In Plutarch's Parallel Lives, he is only briefly mentioned during a dance competition, but in the Histories of Alexander the Great by Quintus Curtius Rufus he is given a more elaborate role in Alexander's court. The 2nd-3rd century CE Egyptian Greek writer Athenaeus mentions Bagoas as well in the context of the same dance competition mentioned by Plutarch, and cites as his source the work of Dicaearchus from 4th century BC; both sources present him as Alexander's lover, and Plutarch refers to him as the King's eromenos ("beloved" or subordinate lover). Only the elder Bagoas is elaborated upon in the source by Diodorus Siculus.

Historian William Woodthorpe Tarn rejected the stories of Bagoas as fabricated in ancient times to defame Alexander, mainly referring to Rufus's fairly fictionalized biography of Alexander that criticized the Macedonian's "degeneration" in embracing foreign Persian customs. In 1958, Ernst Badian rejected Tarn's analysis, suggesting that Alexander was more of a ruthless dictator and that Tarn was blinded by bias. Author Mary Renault, though not questioning Bagoas' existence, also recognized Rufus's biased animosity towards Alexander, stating: "[Rufus's account of Alexander] is bent that way by recourse to Athenian anti-Macedonian agitprop, written by men who never set eyes on him, and bearing about as much relation to objective truth as one would expect to find in a History of the Jewish People commissioned by Adolf Hitler."

Daniel Ogden asserts there is "no strong reason to doubt the actuality of sexual relationship" between the pair. However, he acknowledges that "the most sustained representation of Bagoas' relationship with Alexander, Curtius', was shown to be structured primarily by artificial moral arcs (...) and by a will to play games with notions of effeminancy and power."

== Life ==
=== Dance competition ===
According to Plutarch, Bagoas won a dancing contest after the crossing of the Gedrosian Desert and the Macedonian troops applauded and demanded that drunk Alexander kiss Bagoas, and he did so.

… one day after [Alexander] had drunk pretty hard, it is said, he went to see a prize of dancing contended for, in which his favourite Bagoas, having gained the victory, crossed the theatre in his dancing habit, and sat down close by him, which so pleased the Macedonians, that they made loud acclamations for him to kiss Bagoas, and never stopped clapping their hands and shouting till Alexander put his arms round him and kissed him.

— Plutarch, Parallel Lives (second century AD)

=== Rufus account ===
The fullest surviving account of Bagoas is given in the Latin Histories of Alexander the Great by Rufus, a first century Roman historian. Rufus focuses on the degeneration of Alexander, and illustrates this with an account of the machinations of his eunuch, Bagoas. Bagoas is described as "in the flower of his youth," and was appointed first by Darius III and later given to Alexander by Nabarzanes. In this account, Bagoas weaponizes his inherited place in Alexander's court to destroy his enemies. The Persian satrap Orxines earns the enmity of Bagoas by refusing to pay him respect in court, claiming it is not Persian custom to pay respect to men used as women, and refers to Bagoas as a whore. Bagoas then manoeuvres to have Orxines accused of plundering the tomb of Cyrus the Great, and the satrap is executed for this crime. In his final words, Orxines decries the state of affairs: "I had heard that women were once rulers in Asia but this really is something new – a eunuch a king!".

== In media ==
- Bagoas is the narrator and title character of The Persian Boy, the historical novel by Mary Renault, which portrays him sympathetically. He reappears in a smaller but still significant role in the sequel Funeral Games.
- He appears in Les Conquêtes d'Alexandre by Roger Peyrefitte. Peyrefitte's Bagoas rides to battle by the side of Darius. (Note: Un jeune cavalier de seize ans, d’une radieuse beauté, paré d’or et de perles, portait l’insigne royal, une aigle d’or aux ailes déployées, fixée sur une pique d’argent: c’était Bagoas, l’eunuque et mignon favori de Darius. - A young rider of sixteen, of radiant beauty, adorned with gold and pearls, wore the royal insignia, a golden eagle with outstretched wings, fixed on a silver pike: it was Bagoas, the eunuch and favourite mignon of Darius.)
- He is played by Francisco Bosch in the Oliver Stone film Alexander (2004), which is based in part on Renault's writings, and contains the dancing scene, although a love scene was cut from the film.
- He is also a major character in Jo Graham's novel Stealing Fire, part of her Numinous World series.

== Sources ==
- Athenaeus of Naucratis (1854). "Chapter 80". The Deipnosophists, or Banquet of the Learned. Vol. XIII. Translated by Charles Duke Yonge. London: Bohn's Classical Library. LCCN 2002554451. OCLC 49415755 – via Perseus Digital Library.
- Aelianus, Claudius (1670) [1665]. Various Histories (Varia Historia). Translated by Thomas Stanley (2nd ed.). London, United Kingdom: Thomas Basset.
- Athenaeus of Naucratis (1854). The Deipnosophists, or Banquet of the Learned. Translated by Charles Duke Yonge. London, United Kingdom: Bohn's Classical Library. LCCN 2002554451. OCLC 49415755 – via Perseus Digital Library.
- Badian, E. (November 1958). "The Eunuch Bagoas". The Classical Quarterly. 8 (3–4): 144–157. doi:10.1017/S0009838800021765.
- Badian, Ernst (12 March 2012). Collected Papers on Alexander the Great. Routledge. ISBN 978-1-136-44934-5.
- Baynham, Elizabeth; Ryan, Terry (26 April 2018). ""The Unmanly Ruler": Bagoas, Alexander's Eunuch Lover, Mary Renault's the Persian Boy, and Alexander Reception". Brill's Companion to the Reception of Alexander the Great. Brill. pp. 615–639. doi:10.1163/9789004359932_026. ISBN 978-90-04-35993-2.
- "Livre des fais d'Alexandre le grant (The J. Paul Getty Museum Collection)". The J. Paul Getty Museum Collection.
- McIlvain, Lynnie (20 November 2020). "Bagoas the Younger: Who Was Alexander the Great's Little-Known Lover?". TheCollector.
- Peyrefitte, Roger (1979). Les conquêtes d'Alexandre (in French). A. Michel. ISBN 978-2-226-00878-7. "Un jeune cavalier de seize ans, d'une radieuse beauté, paré d'or et de perles, portait l'insigne royal, une aigle d'or aux ailes déployées, fixée sur une pique d'argent: c'était Bagoas, l'eunuque et mignon favori de Darius."
- Plutarch (1865) [1859]. Clough, Arthur Hugh (ed.). Parallel Lives. Translated by John Dryden (2nd ed.). London, United Kingdom: University College, London – via Wikisource.
- Roisman, Joseph (2003). Brill's companion to Alexander the Great. Leiden: Brill. ISBN 9789004124639.
- Rufus, Quintus Curtius; et al. (Foreword by Johann Freinsheim) (1714). Histories of Alexander the Great. Vol. I. Translated by John Digby. London, United Kingdom: W.B. for Bernard Lintott – via Archive.org.
- Siculus, Diodorus (1935). Library of History: Loeb Classical Library. Translated by Oldfather, C. H. Cambridge, MA.: Harvard University Press.
- Tougher, Sean (2008). "The Renault Bagoas: The Treatment of Alexander the Great's Eunuch in Mary Renault's The Persian Boy" (PDF). New Voices in Classical Reception Studies (3): 77–89.
