= The Last of the Wine =

Novel by Mary Renault

- First US edition
- Author: Mary Renault
- Language: English
- Genre: Historical novel
- Publisher: Longmans, Green & Co (UK); Pantheon Books (US)
- Publication date: 1956
- Publication place: South Africa
- Media type: Print (Hardback)
- Pages: 350pp (1958 hardback)
- OCLC: 47781915
- Dewey Decimal: 823/.912 21
- LC Class: PR6035.E55 L37 2001

The Last of the Wine is Mary Renault's first novel set in ancient Greece, the setting that would become her most important arena. The novel was published in 1956 and is the second of her works to feature male homosexuality as a major theme. It was a bestseller within the gay community. The book is a portrait of Athens at the close of the Golden Age and the end of the Peloponnesian War with Sparta, and includes Socrates as a character.

== Plot summary ==
The novel is narrated by Alexias, a noble Athenian youth, who becomes a noted beauty in the city and a champion runner. The novel suggests that young male Athenians were treated almost like modern debutantes and wooed by older men seeking to be their lovers; in fact, in a memorable passage, Alexias' father, Myron, himself a former beauty and champion athlete, writes to his son before leaving Athens for the Sicilian Expedition. The father imparts to the son the traits he should seek in a lover – qualities like honour, loyalty and courage. However, the father also warns the son not to become involved with women as he is much too young. (See Athenian pederasty.)

As an ephebe (adolescent male), Alexias falls in love with Lysis, a man in his 20s – a champion wrestler and a student of Socrates. The novel follows their relationship through the Peloponnesian War, the surrender of Athens, the establishment of the Thirty Tyrants rule over Athens, the democratic rebellion of Thrasybulus. The story ends with first hints of the eventual trial of Socrates for teaching blasphemy and sowing social disorder.

From the beginning of the novel, Socrates figures prominently; both Alexias and Lysis become his students in their youth. Socrates was very prominent around the city, always talking to new people. Also characterised in the novel are Plato and several figures from his Dialogues who were Socrates' students, including Xenophon, Crito and Phaedo. Another historical figure who features in the story, albeit mostly off-stage, is Alcibiades, the Athenian general who flees Athens on a charge of sacrilege and functions as a military adviser to Sparta until he is recalled by a resurgent democracy in Athens. Alexias and Lysis serve under Alcibiades' command until his carelessness leads the fleet to disaster and he once again goes into exile.

In the course of the novel, Lysis marries a girl who sees Alexias favourably and encourages the continuation of her husband's relationship with him. Not long after this, Athens is defeated by Sparta in the Peloponnesian War. Alexias' conservative father is murdered under the Spartan-installed tyranny known as the Thirty Tyrants. Alexias and Lysis go to Thebes, joining Thrasybulus when he leads a force of exiles to liberate Athens. Lysis is killed in the battle between the Long Walls running from the port of Piraeus to Athens (the Battle of Munychia). Shortly after the victory, Alexias takes Lysis' widow under his protection, marries her and continues his family line. The book ends with the postscript that this story (incomplete and long-forgotten) has been found by Alexias' grandson (also named Alexias), a commander of Athenian cavalry in the service of Alexander the Great.

== Major themes ==
The Last of the Wine engages the mores and culture of Classical Greece, including symposia (drinking parties), the treatment of women, the importance of athletic, military and philosophical training among young men, marriage customs, and daily life in war and peace.

== Reception ==
Myke Cole wrote for Tor.com that "This gorgeous and elegiac exploration of the Peloponnesian War is remarkable for its honest and intimate treatment of homosexuality in Ancient Greece."
