= Mary Renault =

British novelist (1905–1983)

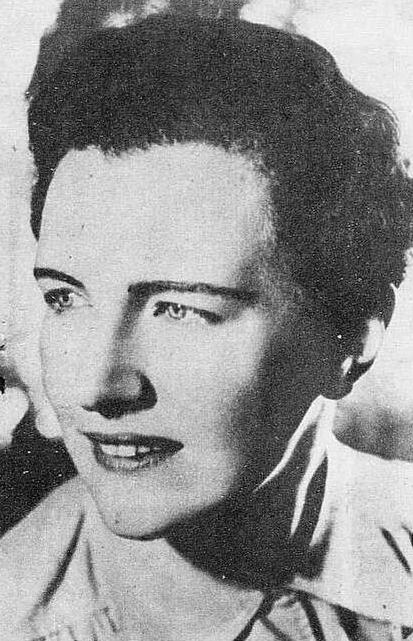
- Renault c. 1946
- Born: Eileen Mary Challans; 4 September 1905; Forest Gate, Essex, England
- Died: 13 December 1983 (aged 78); Cape Town, South Africa
- Education: St Hugh's College, Oxford
- Occupation: Writer
- Partner: Julie Mullard (1933–1983)
- Writing career
- Period: 1939–1981
- Genres: Historical fiction, contemporary romance, war novel, gay literature
- Notable works: The King Must Die; The Charioteer; The Last of the Wine; Fire from Heaven; The Persian Boy; Funeral Games

Eileen Mary Challans (4 September 1905 – 13 December 1983), known by her pen name Mary Renault (/ˈrɛnoʊlt/), was a British writer best known for her historical novels set in ancient Greece.

Born in Forest Gate in 1905, she attended St Hugh's College, Oxford, from 1924 until 1928. After graduating from St Hugh's with a Third Class in English, she worked as a nurse and began writing her first novels, which were contemporary romances. In 1948, she moved to Durban, South Africa with her partner, Julie Mullard, and later to Cape Town, where she spent the rest of her life. Living in South Africa allowed her to write about openly gay characters without fearing the censorship and homophobia of England. She devoted herself to writing historical fiction in the 1950s, which were also her most successful books. She is best known for her historical fiction today.

Renault's works are often rooted in themes related to love, sexuality and relationships. Her books attracted a large gay following at the time of their publication, when few mainstream works depicted homosexuality in a positive light. Her work has had a generally positive reception by critics. She has received numerous awards and honours, both during her lifetime and posthumously.

== Biography ==
=== Youth and education ===
Eileen Mary Challans was born on 4 September 1905 at Dacre Lodge, 49 Plashet Road, Forest Gate, Essex. She was the elder daughter of physician Frank Challans and (Mary) Clementine Newsome, daughter of dentist John Baxter, who claimed descent from the Puritan church leader Richard Baxter. Her mother was "a desperately aspirational housewife, whose favourite word was 'nice'". She had one younger sister, (Frances) Joyce, who Challans always felt was the favourite daughter. She had a comfortable yet strained childhood; her parents had a contentious relationship, and her father was neglectful of his children. When she was 15, her mother's sister Bertha paid for her to be sent to a boarding school in Bristol, and then to attend the University of Oxford. As a result of entering boarding school later than most of her peers, Challans struggled to catch up in mathematics and Latin. She relied on the Loeb Classical Library to read Greek and Latin texts with English translation.

Challans was educated first at Levick Family School and Clifton Girls School in Bristol. She began attending St Hugh's College, Oxford, then an all-women's college, in 1924. While at St Hugh's, she studied history, mythology, philosophy and ancient literature. Although her studies included classical languages such as Latin, her Ancient Greek language skills were self taught. She graduated with an undergraduate degree in English in 1928. One of her tutors was J.R.R. Tolkien, who encouraged her to write a novel set in medieval times, but she burned the manuscript because she felt it lacked authenticity.

=== Nursing and early writing ===
Challans' mother encouraged her to take an interest in marriage. Following her degree, when her father refused to support her career as a writer, she left home and, to support herself, trained as a nurse. She began her training in 1933 at the Radcliffe Infirmary in Oxford. During her training she met Julie Mullard, a fellow nurse with whom she established a lifelong romantic relationship. Despite the mores of the time and the fact that Mullard had received an offer of marriage from one of her male lovers, they were determined to be a couple. They sneaked into each other's rooms at night, and on one occasion had to hide beneath the sheets when a matron burst in.

Challans worked as a nurse while writing her first novel, Purposes of Love, using the pseudonym Mary Renault to keep her writing secret should it meet with disapproval. She chose this pseudonym from Froissart's Chronicles and used it for the entirety of her professional literary career. The novel was published in 1939 by Longman in the United Kingdom, and by William Morrow and Company in the United States. After receiving a cash advance from Morrow, Challans bought an MG sports car. Although Challans had failed her driving test, she decided to drive the car anyway along with Mullard, who also did not have a driving licence. In June 1939, they were in a car crash. Mullard was hospitalized for facial injuries. A few weeks later, the two women retreated to a small cottage in Cornwall where they lived off the income from Purposes of Love. Challans had nearly completed her second novel when World War II began. By May 1940, both Challans and Mullard had been called in to treat patients at Winford Emergency Hospital in Bristol. There, they briefly treated evacuees from the Battle of Dunkirk. Renault worked in the Radcliffe Infirmary's brain surgery ward until 1945.

Her novel The Friendly Young Ladies (1943), about a lesbian relationship between a writer and a nurse, is thought to be inspired by her relationship with Mullard. It is the only lesbian novel written by Renault.

=== Academic and writing career ===
In 1948, after winning an MGM prize worth £37,000 for Return to Night, Challans was able to leave nursing and devote herself to writing full time. Challans and Mullard emigrated to Durban, South Africa, which was home to a community of gay and lesbian expatriates who had left the more sexually repressive environments of Britain and the United States. Because of this, Challans and Mullard were able to live together as a couple without causing much controversy. Challans worked successfully as an author after the couple's arrival in South Africa in 1948, and continued to write until her death in 1983. In 1964, she became president of the South African chapter of International PEN, an association of writers, a position which she held until 1981. Both women were critical of the less liberal aspects of their new home, and participated in the Black Sash movement against apartheid in the 1950s. Challans became disillusioned with Black Sash, however, when it refused to protest against new anti-homosexuality laws in 1968.

Challans travelled in Africa, Greece and Crete, but never returned to Britain. She had a mutual admiration for the novelist Patrick O'Brian, with whom she exchanged letters. Her earlier British reputation as a writer of sensationalist bestsellers faded, and in 1983 she was listed as one of the famous alumnae who had brought honour to the Radcliffe Infirmary Nurses' Home. Challans became ill in August 1983, and was diagnosed with lung cancer and pneumonia. In her final days she tried to complete a final novel, which remained unfinished after she went into residential hospice care. She died in Cape Town on 13 December 1983. She directed her papers, including correspondence and the partially finished manuscript, were to be burned upon her death. Mullard died in 1996.

== Chronology of writing ==
Beginning with Purposes of Love, Challans' first six novels had a contemporary setting. She published Return to Night in 1947. This was followed by North Face in 1948.

Challans' last contemporary romance novel, The Charioteer (1953), marked a change in theme. It tells the story of two young gay servicemen in the 1940s who try to model their relationship on the ideals expressed in Plato's Phaedrus and Symposium. It echoed themes which Challans later revisited with her historical novels.

Between 1956 and 1981, Challans turned to historical fiction, all of which was set in ancient Greece. Challans, by then in her mid-fifties, made her first foray into historical fiction with The Last of the Wine. The novel was her greatest financial and critical success to date, and she followed it with several other historical novels. Her historical novels include a pair of novels about the mythological hero Theseus and a trilogy about the career of Alexander the Great.

== Themes ==
=== Relationships ===
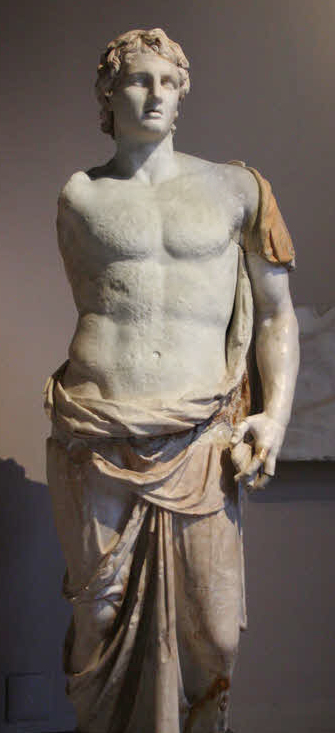
Marble statue of Alexander the Great

A central theme in Challans' work, both contemporary and historical, is the presentation of love as a struggle between the pursuer and the pursued. This dynamic was greatly influenced by the philosophy of Plato, in particular Phaedrus, his dialogue on love. Hierarchical relationships, involving age gaps or differences in social status, are frequently explored in Challans' novels. In her novels featuring same-sex couples, these hierarchies serve as an alternative to traditional gender roles. Fire from Heaven centres on the relationship between Alexander and his lover Hephaestion, while The Persian Boy is about the relationship between the enslaved Bagoas and Alexander. The novelist Linda Proud described Purposes of Love as "a strange combination of Platonism and hospital romance". Challans' Return to Night, another hospital romance, explores the power dynamics between Hillary, a doctor, and a younger man with whom she has an affair.

=== Sexuality ===
Many of Challans' contemporary romance novels explored same-sex love and desire through their characters. For example, Colanna, an openly lesbian character, features in Purposes of Love. The Charioteer has been noted as an early example of the "gay novel". It was written during a period of time when male homosexuality was illegal in the United Kingdom, particularly under the policies implemented by David Maxwell Fyfe, 1st Earl of Kilmuir, who was Home Secretary from 1951 to 1954. Simon Russell Beale described its contemporary context as "that sombre, twilit world of the early 1950s, when so much of homosexual life was threaded through with fear of exposure." The protagonists of the novel, Ralph and Laurie, look to Greek ideals as a template for how to understand their own masculinity and homosexuality. The society of Classical Greece acts as a more tolerant and liberating alternative to contemporary British society.

Challans' American publishers refused to publish The Charioteer for fear of prosecution. Renault attributed this hesitancy to the rise of McCarthyism in the United States. It was not published in the United States until 1959, which made it a somewhat later addition to homosexual literature in the United States because American readers and critics had accepted serious gay love stories in such works as Djuna Barnes' Nightwood (1936), Carson McCullers' Reflections in a Golden Eye (1941), Truman Capote's Other Voices, Other Rooms (1948) and Gore Vidal's The City and the Pillar (1948).

Her Alexander Trilogy was one of the first mainstream literary works to feature homosexual relationships prominently. By turning away from the twentieth century and writing stories about male lovers in the warrior societies of ancient Greece, Renault no longer had to deal with homosexuality and anti-gay prejudice as social "problems". Instead, she was free to consider larger ethical and philosophical concerns while examining the nature of love and leadership.

=== Role of women ===
According to Filippo Carlà-Uhink and Anja Wieber, Challans' women behave in stereotypical ways, being simultaneously helpless and ruthless. Critics have remarked on the negative portrayal of women, particularly mothers, in her work. This is often attributed to the fraught relationship Challans had with her own mother. David Sweetman remarks in his biography of Challans that her novels generally portray mothers in a poor light and that, particularly in her later novels, this is extended to women in general. Daniel Mendelsohn said that both her "contemporary and the Greek novels feature unsettling depictions of bad marriages and, particularly, of nightmarishly passive-aggressive wives and mothers." Her generally negative depiction of women has also been noted by the critic Carolyn Gold Heilbrun. By contrast, in The Bull from the Sea, Challans depicts the Queen of the Amazons Hyppolyta as the co-equal of her consort Theseus, the Greek Hero, second only to Heracles, where Hippolyta 'represents Theseus's ideal of femininity, embodying courage and honesty'.

== Views ==
Challans was a Platonist, which influenced her personal views on love and relationships.

=== Gay liberation ===
Though Challans appreciated her gay following, she was uncomfortable with the "gay pride" movement that emerged in the 1970s after the Stonewall riots, and she was reluctant to identify as a lesbian. Like Laurie Odell, the protagonist of The Charioteer, she was suspicious of identifying oneself primarily by one's sexual orientation. Late in her life she expressed hostility to the gay rights movement, troubling some of her fans. Her views on the gay rights movement were elaborated upon in an afterword to The Friendly Ladies written shortly before her death in 1983.

Congregated homosexuals waving banners are really not conducive to a goodnatured 'Vive la difference!' ... People who do not consider themselves to be, primarily, human beings amongst their fellow humans, deserve to be discriminated against, and ought not to make a meal of it.

=== Apartheid ===
After relocating to South Africa in the late 1940s, Challans was involved in the anti-apartheid movement, although not as actively as many of her contemporaries. In a 1979 interview, Challans said that although she signed petitions and written protests against apartheid, she did not "pass [herself] off as a heroine. You don't get locked up for writing protests." According to Challans, she did not feel strongly compelled to write about apartheid in her novels because it made no major impact on her life, saying, "I have never profited from apartheid and I have never been segregated."

== Reception and legacy ==
=== Reception ===
Challans' work was generally well received during her lifetime, and has enjoyed a continuously positive reception in retrospective reviews. The historian Tom Holland said, "No other novelist has so successfully evoked the beauty, the charisma and the terror of ancient Greece." Peter Parker of The Telegraph described The Charioteer as a "classic" in a 2014 review. Her novels, both historical and contemporary, have been republished by Virago.

Fire from Heaven, her novel about Alexander the Great, was one of the six books shortlisted for the Lost Man Booker Prize in 2010.

Noël Coward's reception of Challans' work and her portrayal of homosexual relationships in particular was less warm:

I have also read The Charioteer by Miss Mary Renault. Oh dear, I do, do wish well-intentioned ladies would not write books about homosexuality. This one is turgid, unreal and so ghastly earnest. It takes the hero – soi-disant – three hundred pages to reconcile himself to being queer as a coot, and his soul-searching and deep, deep introspection is truly awful. There are 'queer' parties in which everyone calls everyone 'my dear' a good deal, and over the whole book is a shimmering lack of understanding of the subject. I'm sure the poor woman meant well but I wish she'd stick to recreating the glory that was Greece and not fuck about with dear old modern homos.

=== Historical accuracy ===
Although not a classicist by training, Challans was admired in her day for her scrupulous recreations of the ancient Greek world. Her work was critically acclaimed for the meticulously researched historical detail she included. Some of the history presented in her fiction and in her nonfiction work, The Nature of Alexander, has been called into question, however. Her novels about Theseus rely on the controversial theories of Robert Graves and take liberties in depicting the society of ancient Crete. Mary Beard and John Henderson observed Challans' novels create "in mythical prehistoric Crete [...] a weird 'other world', where a society free from 'our' inhibitions (particularly sexual) can be realized."

Some of her portrayals of individual historical figures have also been criticized. Her portrait of Alexander has been criticized as uncritical and romanticised. Kevin Kopelson, Professor of English at the University of Iowa, felt that Challans "mischaracterise[d] pederastic relationships as heroic." Defying centuries of admiration for Demosthenes as a great orator, Challans portrayed him as a cruel, corrupt and cowardly demagogue.

=== Legacy and influence ===
Challans' work drew a wide readership. When asked who his favourite author was, John F. Kennedy replied, "Mary Renault".

At the time they were published, Challans' works were among the few novels to present love between persons of the same sex as a natural part of life rather than a problem. Daniel Mendelsohn discussed the impact that Challans' work and their correspondence had on him as young boy. The Charioteer has been described as "a historical gay document", providing guidance and comfort to gay men through classical literature in an essentially hostile world. Her sympathetic treatment of love between men won her a wide gay readership and led to rumours that Challans was a gay man writing under a female pseudonym. Challans found these rumours amusing but also sought to distance herself from being labelled a "gay writer".

Challans' work has influenced historical fiction and classical literature. The historian Bettany Hughes credited Renault with capturing the "hardcore, drug-saturated sensuality of the ancient world." Hughes later wrote the introduction to reprints of her work, including The King Must Die and The Bull From the Sea.

She has been cited as an inspiration by novelists such as Douglas Stuart and Kate Forsyth. Suzanne Collins said that The Hunger Games was partly inspired by The King Must Die, which reimagined Minos' Labyrinth as an arena where Athenian tributes had to fight for their lives to entertain the Cretan elite.

Bernard Dick wrote The Hellenism of Mary Renault (1972), which analyzed the classical influences reflected in her corpus of work. Dick corresponded with Challans from 1969 until her death in 1983. The letters were eventually donated to the St Hugh's College archive, which also holds other letters and transcriptions of interviews with Challans before her death.

An hour-long documentary about her life titled Mary Renault – Love and War in Ancient Greece was aired on BBC Four in 2006. The documentary included contributions from Hughes, filmmaker Oliver Stone, and broadcaster Sue MacGregor. The Mary Renault Prize is offered at St Hugh's College, Challans' alma mater. It awards cash prizes to the best essays on the Classical reception, funded by royalties from Challans' work.

=== Adaptations of her work ===
The King Must Die and its sequel The Bull from the Sea were adapted by Michael Bakewell into a single 11-part BBC Radio 4 serial entitled The King Must Die. It was directed by David Spenser and broadcast between 5 June 1983 and 14 August 1983. It starred Gary Bond (Theseus), John Westbrook (Pittheus), Frances Jeater (queen of Eleusis), Carole Boyd (Aithra), Alex Jennings (Amyntor), Sarah Badel, David March and Christopher Guard.

The Charioteer was adapted into a ten-episode serial for BBC Radio 4's Book at Bedtime, read by Anton Lesser and produced by Clive Brill, which was broadcast over two weeks from 25 November 2013.

== Publications ==
=== Contemporary fiction ===
- Purposes of Love (1939) (US title: Promise of Love)
- Kind Are Her Answers (1940)
- The Friendly Young Ladies (1944) It was published in the US as The Middle Mist, 1945
- Return to Night (1947) A French translation was published in Paris in 1948 by A. Michel, under the title Recours à la nuit.
- North Face (1948) (UK 1949)
- The Charioteer (1953) (US 1959) The Charioteer was published in Spanish in 1989 – translated by María José Rodellar – with the title El Auriga, and into Greek in 1990 with the title O ηνίοχος.

=== Novels about Ancient Greece ===
- The Last of the Wine (1956) — set in Athens during the Peloponnesian War; the narrator is a student of Socrates
- The King Must Die (1958) — the mythical Theseus up to his father's death
- The Bull from the Sea (1962) — the remainder of Theseus' life
- The Mask of Apollo (1966) — an actor at the time of Plato and Dionysius the Younger
- Fire from Heaven (1969) — Alexander the Great from the age of four up to his father's death
- The Persian Boy (1972) — from Bagoas' perspective; Alexander the Great after the conquest of Persia
- The Praise Singer (1978) — the poet Simonides of Ceos (UK 1979)
- Funeral Games (1981) — Alexander's successors

=== Non-fiction ===
- The Lion in the Gateway: The Heroic Battles of the Greeks and Persians at Marathon, Salamis, and Thermopylae (1964) — about the Persian Wars
- The Nature of Alexander (1975) — a biography of Alexander the Great

== See also ==
- Classical reception studies
- LGBT history

== General and cited sources ==
- Alderson, Brian (1990). "Challans, (Eileen) Mary". Dictionary of National Biography. Supplement, 1980–1989. Oxford: Oxford University Press.
- Sweetman, David (1993). Mary Renault: A Biography. London: Chatto & Windus. ISBN 0-7011-3568-9.
- Zilboorg, Caroline (2001). The Masks of Mary Renault: A Literary Biography. Columbia, Mo.: University of Missouri Press. ISBN 0-8262-1322-7.
