= Cynane =

Half-sister of Alexander the Great (c.357–323 BC)

- Kυνάνη
- Born: c. 357 BC
- Died: 323 BC
- Burial place: Vergina
- Title: Princess of Macedon
- Spouse: Amyntas IV of Macedon
- Children: Eurydice
- Parents: Philip II of Macedon (father); Audata (mother)
- Family: Argead

Cynane (Greek: Kυνάνη, Kynane or Κύνα, Cyna or Κύννα, Cynna; 357 – 323 BC) was half-sister to Alexander the Great, and daughter of Philip II by Audata, an Illyrian princess. She is estimated to have been born in 357 BC.

== Biography ==
According to Polyaenus, Audata trained her daughter in "the arts of war" in the Illyrian tradition. Cynane's father gave her in marriage to her cousin Amyntas, by whom she had a daughter and by whose death she was left a widow in 336 BC. In the following year Alexander promised her hand, as a reward for his services, to Langarus, king of the Agrianians, but the intended bridegroom became ill and died.

Cynane continued unmarried and employed herself in the education of her daughter, Adea or Eurydice, whom she is said to have trained, after the manner of her own education, in martial exercises. It was Eurydice who took command of Cynane's troops after her death. When her half-brother Philip Arrhidaeus was chosen king in 323 BC, Cynane determined to marry Eurydice to him, and crossed over to Asia accordingly.

Out of all royal Macedonian women in the Hellenistic Period, Cynane was one of only three to fight on the front lines. Macurdy claims that Cynane killed an Illyrian queen in battle and is, in fact, one of the only women recorded to have killed an enemy in battle. She also defeated an army of the now dead Alexander the Great when facing Alcetas, brother of Perdiccas (the regent).

Cynane's ambition to marry her daughter Adea to Philip III alarmed Perdiccas, who sent his brother Alcetas to intercept her march into Asia. She was killed, the circumstances of which are unknown, but this shocked the Macedonian troops accompanying him for whom murdering a daughter of Philip II was a profound violation of their loyalties. The resulting mutiny effectively forced Perdiccas to capitulate, and Adea's marriage to Philip III proceeded. Adea and Philip III were eventually killed by Olympias in 317 BC. Following his defeat of Olympias, Cassander gave them proper royal burial at Aegae alongside Cynane herself, reuniting mother and daughter in death.

Polyaenus, half a millennium later, in the second century C.E., wrote:

Cynane, the daughter of Philip was famous for her military knowledge: she conducted armies, and in the field charged at the head of them. In an engagement with the Illyrians, she with her own hand slew Caeria their queen; and with great slaughter defeated the Illyrian army. She married Amyntas, son of Perdiccas; and, soon after losing him, never would take a second husband. By Amyntas she had an only daughter named Eurydice: to whom she gave a military education, and instructed her in the science of war. Upon Alexander’s death, in exclusion of the royal family, his generals parceling out his dominions among themselves, she crossed the Strymon; forcing her way in the face of Antipater, who disputed her passage over it. She then passed the Hellespont, to meet the Macedonian army: when Alcetas with a powerful force advanced to give her battle. The Macedonians at first paused at the sight of Philip’s daughter, and the sister of Alexander: while after reproaching Alcetas with ingratitude, undaunted at the number of his forces, and his formidable preparations for battle, she bravely engaged him; resolved upon a glorious death, rather than, stripped of her dominions, accept a private life, unworthy of the daughter of Philip.

== Bibliography ==
=== Modern sources ===
- Loman, Pasi (2004). "No Woman No War: Women's Participation in Ancient Greek Warfare". Greece & Rome. 51 (1): 34–54. doi:10.1093/gr/51.1.34. ISSN 0017-3835. JSTOR 3567878.
- Smith, William, ed. (1870). "Cynane". Dictionary of Greek and Roman Biography and Mythology.

=== Ancient sources ===
- Aelian, Varia Historia, xiii. 36
- Arrian, Anabasis Alexandri, i. 5
- Athenaeus, Deipnosophistae, xiii. 5
- Diodorus Siculus, Bibliotheca, xix. 52
- Photius, Bibliotheca, cod. 92
- Polyaenus, Stratagemata, viii. 60
