= Audata =

Wife of Philip II of Macedon

Audata Αὐδάτη
- Queen Consort of Macedonia

Queen Consort of Macedonia
- Tenure: c. 359 – c. 336 BC
- Predecessor: Cynane
- Successor: Phila of Elimeia
- Died: 336 BC
- Spouse: Philip II
- Issue: Cynane
Regnal name
- Eurydice
- Dynasty: Argead (by marriage)

Audata (Ancient Greek Αὐδάτη; ruled c. 359 – c. 336 BC) was an Illyrian princess and the first attested wife of Philip II of Macedon.

== Biography ==
She was the daughter or granddaughter of the Illyrian king Bardyllis. In order to concentrate on the internal struggle necessary to secure his crown, Philip II reaffirmed the treaty the Illyrians had imposed on Macedonia by force of arms and sealed the alliance with Bardyllis by his marriage of Audata. This action undoubtedly deterred a full-scale Illyrian invasion of Macedonia at a time when the country was most vulnerable. (Note: The time of this marriage is somewhat disputed while some historians maintain that the marriage happened after the defeat of Bardyllis. (Carney, 2000)) Philip II immediately consolidated his power as a result, so much that he defeated Bardylis in a decisive battle in 358 BC.

Audata was the first attested wife of Philip II. Their marriage has been estimated to have taken place during the events between 360 and 359 BCE. She took the name Eurydice, the name of Philip's mother, after the wedding. This name change was probably due to dynastic reasons, because she was briefly the official queen of Philip II. Calling her Eurydice could easily be a mistake of either Arrian or Photius, but it could also signify that Philip chose to change Audata's Illyrian name to something more Greek, or it could speak to his filial piety or simply to indicate that her status had changed. Soon after, Olympias became the main wife of Philip II.

Her granddaughter was also named Eurydice. Audata probably lived into her daughter's teens and may still have been alive at the time of her daughter's marriage to Philip's nephew Amyntas IV. The assignment of the name Eurydice to Cleopatra, the niece of Attalus in 337/336 BC may suggest that Audata was no longer alive or at the court at that time, but Alexander the Great would certainly have encountered her in Pella as a child.
