= Alexandropolis Maedica =

Ancient Greek town in Thrace

Alexandropolis (Ancient Greek: Ἀλεξανδρόπολις, romanized: Alexandrópolis, lit. 'Alexander's city') in the Thracian region of Maedians, was the first town founded by Alexander the Great after he defeated a local Thracian tribe as a regent (Ancient Greek: έπίτροπος, epitropos) of Macedon in 340 BC. Its name was chosen by analogy with Philippopolis, the town of Thrace founded by Alexander's father, Philip II. He expelled the locals and settled a mixed population. The location of Alexandropolis is unknown, suggesting that a Thracian raid may have caused its disappearance from history (See Zopyrion). Tarn claims Alexandropolis was a military colony rather than a polis.

== See also ==
- List of cities founded by Alexander the Great
