= Roumlouki =

Historical region in Macedonia, Greece

Coordinates: 40°39′N 22°27′E

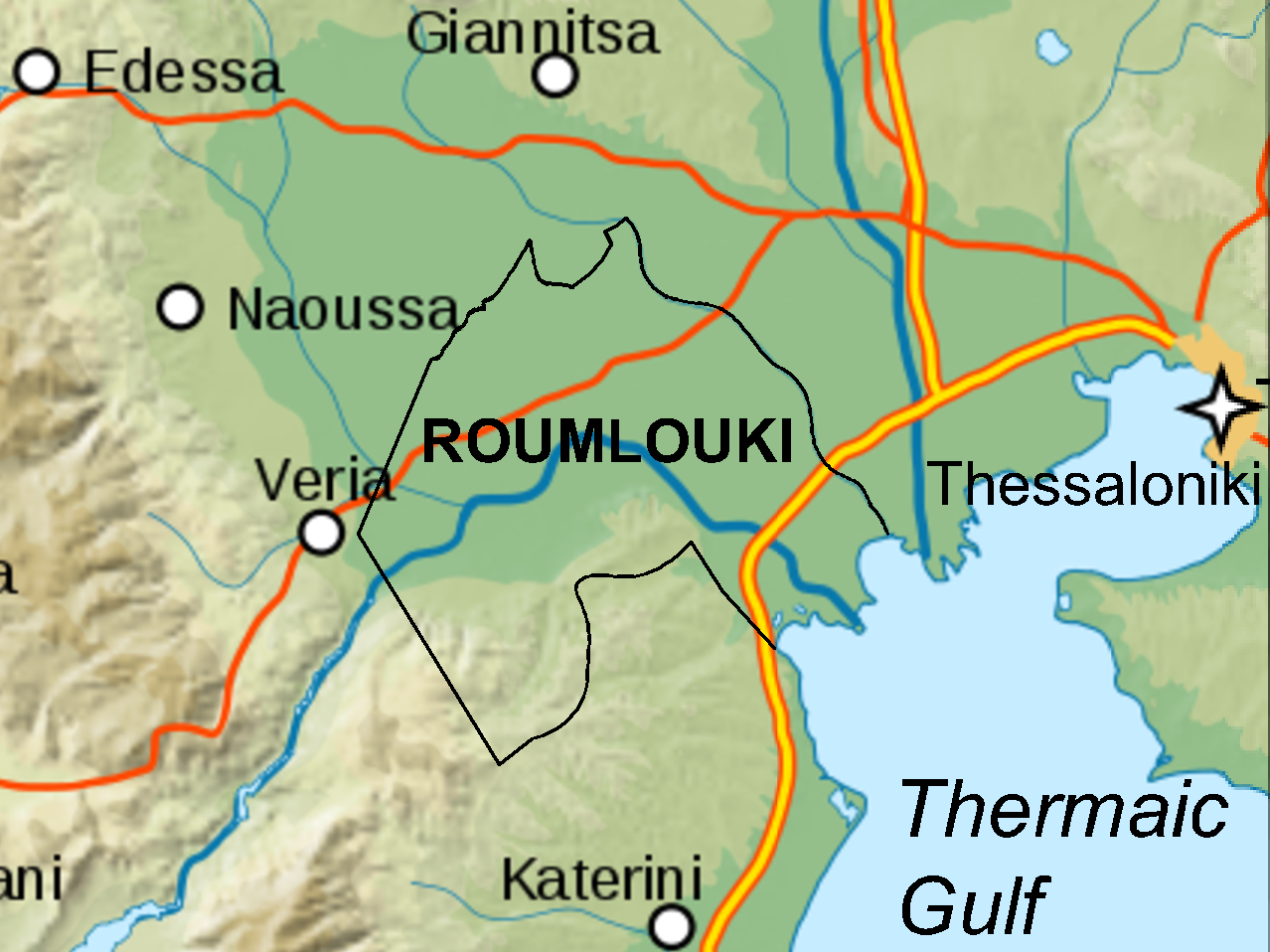
The area of Roumlouki

Roumlouki (Greek: Ρουμλούκι, from the Ottoman Turkish Rûmlık, "place of the Rûm") or Kampania (Καμπανία), is the traditional name of the northeastern part of Imathia located in Macedonia, Greece, specifically the plain of the lower Aliakmon River.

== Location ==
The term refers to the lowlands between the Pierian Mountains in the south to the wetlands of the Giannitsa Lake (now drained) in the north, and from the heights east of Veroia to the mouths of the rivers Aliakmon and Loudias (Ottoman Kara Asmak) in the Thermaic Gulf. According to some accounts, the name extended up to the Axios River in the northeast.

== Settlements ==
The villages that traditionally were accounted as part of the region were Gidas (modern Alexandreia), Meliki, Koryfi, Nichori (Neochori), Reshina (Vrysaki), Nisi, Katafygi, Trichovista, Skylitsi, Kavasila, Stavros, Xechasmeni, Rapsomaniki, Pozarites (Kefalochori), Episkopi, Loutros, Kapsochora, Paliochora, Niseli and Niseloudi, Trikala, Karya, Aidonochori, Platy, Lianovergi, Paliochori, Gritzali (Agathia), Niochoropoulo, Prodromos, Niokastro, Voultista, Mega Alamboro (Prasinada) and Mikro Alamboro, Mylovos, Kouloura, Diavatos, Mikrogouzi (Makrochori), Metsi (Mesi), Ammos, Santena, Geraki, Mavrangeli, Barbesh or Koutlesh (Vergina), Palatitsia, Trichlevo (Trilofo), Sfinista, Kleidi, Kaliani (Aloro), Tsinaforo (Platanos). The actual number of settlements fluctuated, however, as some were abandoned and new ones founded because of the floods of the Aliakmon.

== Gallery ==
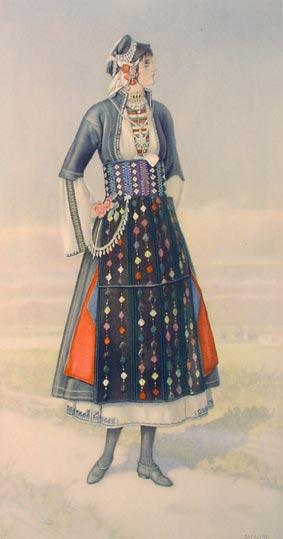
Traditional dress of a woman from the Roumlouki, by Nicolas Sperling

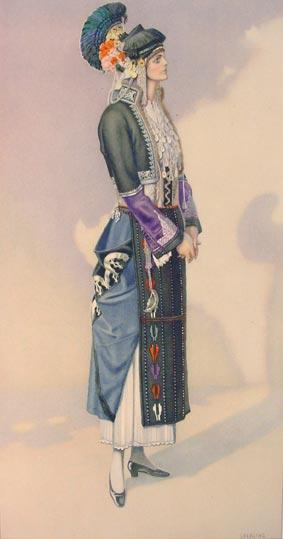
Traditional dress of a woman from the Roumlouki, by Nicolas Sperling

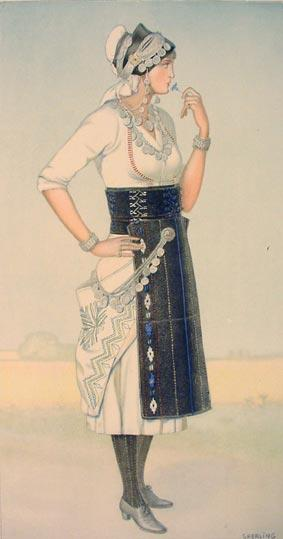
Traditional dress of a woman from the Roumlouki, by Nicolas Sperling
