= List of settlements in Imathia =

This is a list of settlements in Imathia, Greece.

- Agia Marina
- Agia Varvara
- Agios Georgios
- Agkathia
- Alexandreia
- Ammos
- Angelochori
- Arachos
- Arkochori
- Asomata
- Chariessa
- Daskio
- Diavatos
- Episkopi, Alexandreia
- Episkopi, Naousa
- Fyteia
- Georgianoi
- Giannakochori
- Kampochori
- Kastania
- Kato Vermio
- Kavasila
- Kefalochori
- Kleidi
- Kopanos
- Koryfi
- Kouloura
- Koumaria
- Kypseli
- Lefkadia
- Lianovergi
- Loutros
- Lykogianni
- Makrochori
- Marina
- Meliki
- Metochi Prodromou
- Monospita
- Naousa
- Nea Nikomideia
- Neochori
- Neokastro
- Nisi
- Palaio Skyllitsi
- Palatitsia
- Patrida
- Platanos
- Platy
- Polydendro
- Polyplatanos
- Prasinada
- Prodromos
- Profitis Ilias
- Rachi
- Rizomata
- Rodochori
- Sfikia
- Stavros
- Stenimachos
- Sykia
- Trikala
- Trilofo
- Tripotamos
- Vergina
- Veria
- Vrysaki
- Xechasmeni
- Xirolivado
- Zervochori

== See also ==
- List of towns and villages in Greece
