= Lianovergi =

Lianovergi Λιανοβέργι
- Community
- Location within Greece
- Coordinates: 40°38′N 22°30′E
- Country: Greece
- Administrative region: Central Macedonia
- Regional unit: Imathia
- Municipality: Alexandreia
- Municipal unit: Platy
- Elevation: 9 m (30 ft)

Population (2021)
  - Community: 1,345
- Time zone: UTC+2 (EET)
  - Summer (DST): UTC+3 (EEST)
- Postal code: 590 32
- Area code: 2330
- Vehicle registration: HM

Lianovergi (Greek: Λιανοβέργι) is a village in Platy municipal unit in eastern Imathia, Greece. Since the 2011 local government reform it is part of the municipality Alexandreia, of which it is a local community.

== Transport ==
The village is served by a railway station with services to Thessaloniki, Platy, Edessa, and Alexandria.

== Population ==
Historical population
Year	Pop.	±%
1981	1,770	—
1991	1,652	−6.7%
2001	1,623	−1.8%
2011	1,593	−1.8%
2021	1,345	−15.6%

== See also ==
- List of settlements in Imathia
