= Prasinada =

Prasinada Πρασινάδα
- Community
- Location within Greece
- Coordinates: 40°34′N 22°31′E
- Country: Greece
- Administrative region: Central Macedonia
- Regional unit: Imathia
- Municipality: Alexandreia
- Municipal unit: Platy

Population (2021)
  - Community: 498
- Time zone: UTC+2 (EET)
  - Summer (DST): UTC+3 (EEST)

Prasinada (Greek: Πρασινάδα) is a village in the municipality of Alexandreia, Imathia, Greece.
