= Trikala, Imathia =

Trikala Τρίκαλα
- Community
- Location within Greece
- Coordinates: 40°36′N 22°33′E
- Country: Greece
- Administrative region: Central Macedonia
- Regional unit: Imathia
- Municipality: Alexandreia
- Municipal unit: Platy

Population (2021)
  - Community: 1,124
- Time zone: UTC+2 (EET)
  - Summer (DST): UTC+3 (EEST)
- Vehicle registration: HM

Trikala (Greek: Τρίκαλα) is a town in the eastern part of Imathia, Greece. The town is in the municipal unit of Platy. It is situated between the Aliakmon and Loudias rivers, southeast of Alexandreia.

== Population ==
Year	Population
1981	1,653
1991	1,725
2001	1,710
2011	1,415
2021	1,124

== History ==
The origins of Trikala can be traced back to the late 18th century. The church of Agios Dimitrios (St. Demetrius) was built in 1750. The original name of the town, before the first refugees from Northern Thrace in Bulgaria arrived in 1925, was Karyes (meaning walnut trees), the current name, Trikala, means "thrice good".

Trikala was in Ottoman Empire until the Balkan Wars of 1913, afterwards, it became part of Greece. The majority of the population of Trikala to this day is made up by immigrants arriving from the Northern Thrace region of Bulgaria after a mutual population exchange between the two countries and their descendants. In 1935, Trikala saw an influx of Sarakatsani settlers. Some refugees from Pontus arrived before 1940.

== Notable people ==
=== Sports ===
- Dimitrios Itoudis, Basketball coach
- Dimitrios Manos, Football player
- Sokratis Dioudis, Football player
- Georgios Koutsias, Football player

== See also ==
- List of settlements in Imathia
