= Koumaria, Imathia =

Koumaria Κουμαριά
- Community
- Location within Greece
- Coordinates: 40°31′N 22°5.3′E
- Country: Greece
- Administrative region: Central Macedonia
- Regional unit: Imathia
- Municipality: Veria
- Municipal unit: Veria

Area
  - Community: 139.132 km^{2} (53.719 sq mi)
- Elevation: 808 m (2,651 ft)

Population (2021)
  - Community: 189
  - Density: 1.36/km^{2} (3.52/sq mi)
- Time zone: UTC+2 (EET)
  - Summer (DST): UTC+3 (EEST)
- Postal code: 591 00
- Area code: +30-2331
- Vehicle registration: ΗΧ

Koumaria (known as Doliani, Δόλιανη, until 1926; Greek: Κουμαριά, Aromanian: Doljani) is an Aromanian (Vlach) village and a community of the Veroia municipality. Since the 2011 local government reform it was part of the municipality Veroia, of which it was a municipal district. The 2021 census recorded 189 residents in the community. The community of Koumaria covers an area of 139.132 km^{2}.

== Administrative division ==
The community of Koumaria consists of two separate settlements:

- Koumaria (population 163 in 2021)
- Xirolivado (Aromanian: Ksirulivadi; population 26)

== See also ==
- List of settlements in Imathia
