= Naoussa railway station =

Greek railway station

Νάουσα Naoussa
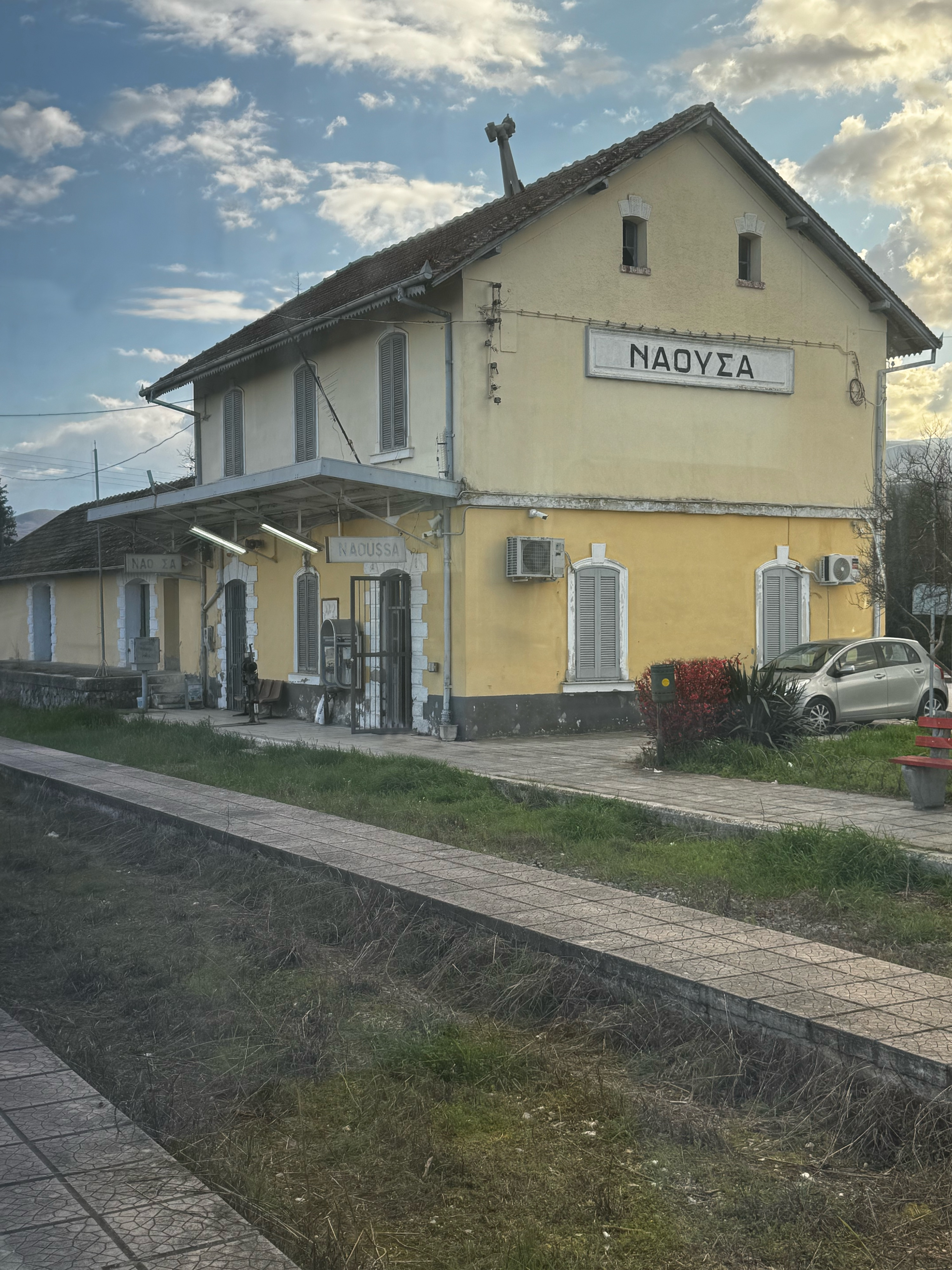
- Naousa railway station building, March 2024

General information
- Location: 592 00, Naousa; Imathia; Greece
- Coordinates: 40°37′17″N 22°08′02″E
- Owner: GAIAOSE
- Operator: Hellenic Train
- Line: Thessaloniki–Bitola railway
- Platforms: 3 (1 non-regular use)
- Tracks: 6 (with sidings)

Construction
- Structure type: at-grade
- Platform levels: 1
- Parking: Yes
- Cycle facilities: No

Other information
- Website: http://www.ose.gr/en/

History
- Opened: 1894 (Reopened Dec 2023)
- Closed: 2021
- Rebuilt: 1916
- Former names: Agoustos

Services
Preceding station	Regional Rail	Following station
Episkopi towards Florina	Line T2	Veria towards Thessaloniki
Location
- Location within Greece

The Naoussa railway station (Greek: Σιδηροδρομικός σταθμός Νάουσα, romanized: Sidirodromikós stathmós Naoussa) is the railway station of Skydra in Central Macedonia, Greece. The station is located near the center of the settlement, on the Thessaloniki–Bitola railway, and is severed by the Thessaloniki Regional Railway (formerly the Suburban Railway).

== History ==
Naousa (Agoustos) Railway station in 1894

Opened in June 1894 in what was then the Ottoman Empire at the completion of the Société du Chemin de Fer ottoman Salonique-Monastir, a branchline of the Chemins de fer Orientaux from Thessaloniki to Bitola. During this period Northern Greece and the southern Balkans where still under Ottoman rule, and Naoussa was known as Agoustos. Naoussa was annexed by Greece on 18 October 1912 during the First Balkan War. On 17 October 1925 The Greek government purchased the Greek sections of the former Salonica Monastir railway and the railway became part of the Hellenic State Railways, with the remaining section north of Florina seeded to Yugoslavia. During this period, the station became an important entry point for supplies and materials

In 1970 OSE became the legal successor to the SEK, taking over responsibilities for most of Greece's rail infrastructure. On 1 January 1971 the station, and most of Greek rail infrastructure where transferred to the Hellenic Railways Organisation S.A., a state-owned corporation. Freight traffic declined sharply when the state-imposed monopoly of OSE for the transport of agricultural products and fertilisers ended in the early 1990s. Many small stations of the network with little passenger traffic were closed down.

In 2001 the infrastructure element of OSE was created, known as GAIAOSE; it would henceforth be responsible for the maintenance of stations, bridges and other elements of the network, as well as the leasing and the sale of railway assists. In 2003, OSE launched "Proastiakos SA", as a subsidiary to serve the operation of the suburban network in the urban complex of Athens during the 2004 Olympic Games. In 2005, TrainOSE was created as a brand within OSE to concentrate on rail services and passenger interface.

Since 2007, the station is served by the Thessaloniki Regional Railway. In 2008, all Proastiakos were transferred from OSE to TrainOSE. In 2009, with the Greek debt crisis unfolding OSE's Management was forced to reduce services across the network. Timetables were cut back and routes closed as the government-run entity attempted to reduce overheads. In 2017 OSE's passenger transport sector was privatised as TrainOSE, currently, a wholly owned subsidiary of Ferrovie dello Stato Italiane infrastructure, including stations, remained under the control of OSE. In July 2022, the station began being served by Hellenic Train, the rebranded TranOSE.

In May 2020, TrainOS introduced an electronic ticketing system to support social distancing on rail services to prevent Covid-19 infection. In 2021, with funding cuts, a decade of crisis and the restrictions during the COVID-19 pandemic, the station was downgraded to a simple stop on the already limitedly served network. In December 2023 coordinated inspection and repair actions on the line, the Naoussa station reopened, while the line received the first pairs of routes to Edessa, after a 3-year hiatus.

The station is owned by GAIAOSE, which since 3 October 2001 owns most railway stations in Greece: the company was also in charge of rolling stock from December 2014 until October 2025, when Greek Railways (the owner of the Thessaloniki–Bitola railway) took over that responsibility.

== Facilities ==
The station is still housed in the original brick-built station building; however, as of (2020) it is closed and rundown. There is no ticket office or waiting rooms. There is no footbridge over the lines, so passengers must walk across the rails. There is a payphone on platform 1. There are extensive sidings at the station, but these are unused and overgrown with abandoned rolling stock left to rust. A restored yellow railcar is also across the road from the station building.

== Services ==
As of September 2026, Line T2 of the Thessaloniki Regional Railway calls at this station: service is currently limited compared to October 2012, with three trains per day to Thessaloniki, two trains per day to Florina (via Edessa), and one train per day to Edessa.

There are currently no services to Bitola in North Macedonia, because the international connection from Mesonisi to Neos Kafkasos is currently disused.

== Station Layout ==
L Ground/Concourse	Customer service	Tickets/Exits
Επίπεδο; Ε1	Side platform, doors will open on the right/left
Επίπεδο; Ε1	Platform 1Α	towards Thessaloniki (Veria) ←
Επίπεδο; Ε1	Platform 1Β	towards Florina (Episkopi) →
Επίπεδο; Ε1	Island platform, doors will open on the right
Επίπεδο; Ε1	Platform 2	towards Thessaloniki (Veria) ←
Επίπεδο; Ε1	Island platform, doors will open on the right
Επίπεδο; Ε1	Platform 3	non-regular use
