= Makedonida =

Makedonida Μακεδονίδα
- Municipal unit
- Location within the regional unit

- Location within Greece
- Coordinates: 40°21′N 22°13′E
- Country: Greece
- Administrative region: Central Macedonia
- Regional unit: Imathia
- Municipality: Veroia

Area
  - Municipal unit: 199.9 km^{2} (77.2 sq mi)

Population (2021)
  - Municipal unit: 1,263
  - Municipal unit density: 6.318/km^{2} (16.36/sq mi)
- Time zone: UTC+2 (EET)
  - Summer (DST): UTC+3 (EEST)
- Vehicle registration: ΗΜ

Makedonida (Greek: Μακεδονίδα) is a former municipality in Imathia, Greece. Since the 2011 local government reform it is part of the municipality Veroia, of which it is a municipal unit. The municipal unit has an area of 199.926 km^{2}. Population 1,263 (2021). The seat of the municipality was in Rizomata.
