= Anthemia =

Anthemia Ανθέμια
- Municipal unit
- Location within the regional unit

- Location within Greece
- Coordinates: 40°38′N 22°08′E
- Country: Greece
- Administrative region: Central Macedonia
- Regional unit: Imathia
- Municipality: Naousa

Area
  - Municipal unit: 74.6 km^{2} (28.8 sq mi)

Population (2021)
  - Municipal unit: 6,864
  - Municipal unit density: 92.0/km^{2} (238/sq mi)
- Time zone: UTC+2 (EET)
  - Summer (DST): UTC+3 (EEST)
- Vehicle registration: ΗΜ

Anthemia (Greek: Ανθέμια) is a former municipality in Imathia, Greece. Since the 2011 local government reform it is part of the municipality Naousa, of which it is a municipal unit. The municipal unit has an area of 74.638 km^{2}. Population 6,864 (2021). The seat of the municipality was in Kopanos.
