= Alexandreia Airport =

Alexandreia Airport Αερολιμένας Αλεξάνδρειας
- IATA: none; ICAO: LGAX

Summary
- Airport type: Military
- Location: Alexandreia, Greece
- Elevation AMSL: 8 m / 27 ft
- Coordinates: 40°39′04″N 022°29′19″E

Map
- Location of airport in Greece

Runways
Direction	Length		Surface
Direction	m	ft	Surface
13/31	1,800	5,906	Asphalt

Alexandreia Airport (Greek: Αερολιμένας Αλεξάνδρειας) (ICAO: LGAX) is a military airport located near Alexandreia, a city in the regional unit of Imathia in Greece.

== Facilities ==
The airport is 8 metres (26 ft) above mean sea level. It has one runway designated 13/31 with an asphalt surface measuring 1,800 by 30 metres (5,906 ft × 98 ft).

== Nearest airports ==
The three other nearest airports are:

- Polykastro Airport – 38 km (21 NM) north-northeast
- Thessaloniki International Airport – 43 km (23 NM) east-southeast
- Sedes Airport – 47 km (25 NM) east-southeast
