= Kato Vermio =

Kato Vermio Κάτω Βέρμιο Selia de Jos, Selia
- Community
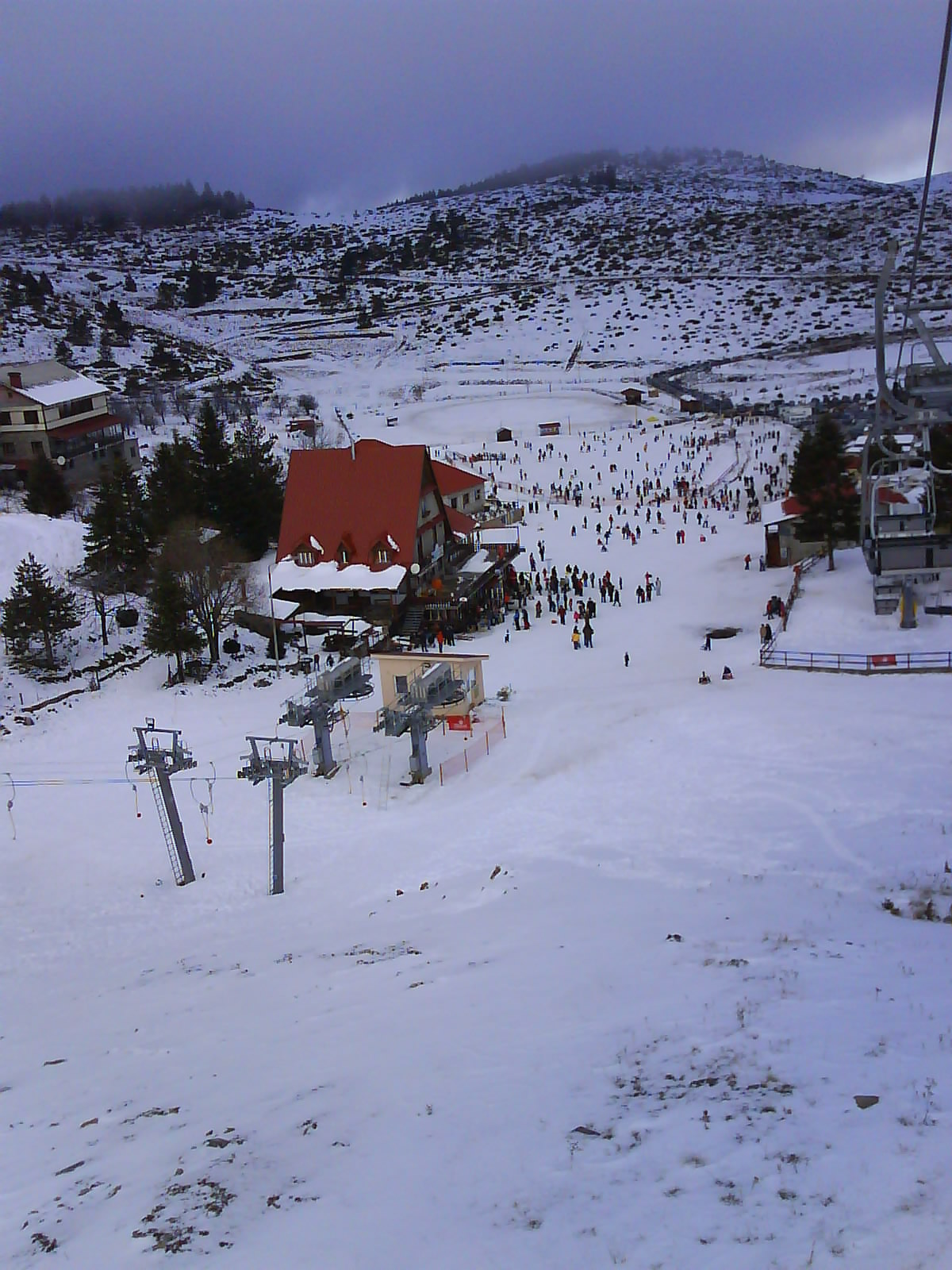
- Seli ski resort

- Location within Greece
- Coordinates: 40°33′N 22°1.6′E
- Country: Greece
- Administrative region: Central Macedonia
- Regional unit: Imathia
- Municipality: Veria
- Municipal unit: Veria

Area
  - Community: 38.915 km^{2} (15.025 sq mi)
- Elevation: 1,450 m (4,760 ft)

Population (2021)
  - Community: 268
  - Density: 6.89/km^{2} (17.8/sq mi)
- Time zone: UTC+2 (EET)
  - Summer (DST): UTC+3 (EEST)
- Postal code: 591 00
- Area code: +30-2331
- Vehicle registration: ΗΧ

Kato Vermio (Greek: Κάτω Βέρμιο, before 1926: Κάτω Σέλι – Kato Seli, Aromanian: Selia de Jos or just Selia) is, primarily, an Aromanian (Vlach) Greek village and a community of the Veria municipality. Since the 2001 local government reform it is part of the municipality of Veria, of which is a municipal district. The 2021 census recorded 268 residents in the village. The altitude of the village is 1450 meters, making it the highest populated village in Greece. There are about 1250 households in the village. The community of Kato Vermio-Seli covers an area of 38.915 km^{2}.

== Geography ==
Seli is located at a distance of 20 km from Veria and 90 km from Thessaloniki, in Imathia, Central Macedonia. The altitude of the village is about 1400 meters, making it, probably, the highest populated village in Greece.

== Climate ==
Seli has a humid continental climate (Dfb). Summers consist of mild to warm days with cool nights. Winters are very cold by Greek standards and snowy. The climate of Seli is somewhat moderated by the Mediterranean Sea, making extreme minimum and maximum temperatures rare.

Climate data for Seli Ski Center (2010-2019) Elevation: 1520m
Month	Jan	Feb	Mar	Apr	May	Jun	Jul	Aug	Sep	Oct	Nov	Dec	Year
Record high °C (°F)	13.2 (55.8)	17.9 (64.2)	16.1 (61.0)	22.9 (73.2)	26.4 (79.5)	29.4 (84.9)	30.6 (87.1)	30.0 (86.0)	27.3 (81.1)	22.0 (71.6)	18.3 (64.9)	14.6 (58.3)	30.6 (87.1)
Mean daily maximum °C (°F)	1.9 (35.4)	3.3 (37.9)	6.2 (43.2)	11.0 (51.8)	14.7 (58.5)	19.1 (66.4)	21.8 (71.2)	22.0 (71.6)	17.8 (64.0)	12.6 (54.7)	8.5 (47.3)	4.1 (39.4)	11.9 (53.5)
Daily mean °C (°F)	−1.4 (29.5)	0.1 (32.2)	2.4 (36.3)	6.5 (43.7)	10.4 (50.7)	14.5 (58.1)	16.9 (62.4)	16.9 (62.4)	13.2 (55.8)	8.4 (47.1)	4.9 (40.8)	0.5 (32.9)	7.8 (46.0)
Mean daily minimum °C (°F)	−4.4 (24.1)	−2.9 (26.8)	−1.0 (30.2)	2.7 (36.9)	6.4 (43.5)	10.3 (50.5)	12.0 (53.6)	12.2 (54.0)	9.1 (48.4)	4.8 (40.6)	1.7 (35.1)	−2.9 (26.8)	4.0 (39.2)
Record low °C (°F)	−26.0 (−14.8)	−22.3 (−8.1)	−18.6 (−1.5)	−12.4 (9.7)	−3.8 (25.2)	3.2 (37.8)	6.9 (44.4)	5.3 (41.5)	−6.1 (21.0)	−14.8 (5.4)	−17.2 (1.0)	−23.6 (−10.5)	−26.0 (−14.8)
Average precipitation mm (inches)	58.7 (2.31)	82.3 (3.24)	109.6 (4.31)	81.3 (3.20)	116.3 (4.58)	76.7 (3.02)	70.8 (2.79)	54.8 (2.16)	71.5 (2.81)	69.9 (2.75)	111.7 (4.40)	64.6 (2.54)	968.2 (38.11)
Average precipitation days	8.9	12.1	12.9	9.0	10.6	8.6	6.0	5.0	6.7	8.2	9.7	8.6	106.3
Source: National Observatory of Athens

== Tourism ==
Seli is a winter sports resort located in the Vermion Mountains of northern Greece. There are many restored and newly built vacation homes, mountain cottages and chalets in the village, and the climate consists of cool summers and snowy winters. Most of the residents are native Greek-speaking Vlachs. The village has many inns & hotels and a few cafe-bars and restaurants or tavernas. During the summer months the population rises to 3000 people.

The ski lift in Seli village was the first one built in the entire country in 1934, making Seli the oldest ski resort in Greece.

== Notable people ==
- Cola Nicea (1886–?), Aromanian armatole during the Macedonian Struggle

== See also ==
- List of settlements in Imathia
