= Sykia, Imathia =

Sykia Συκιά
- Community
- Location within Greece
- Coordinates: 40°27′16″N 22°22′29″E
- Country: Greece
- Administrative region: Central Macedonia
- Regional unit: Imathia
- Municipality: Veroia
- Municipal unit: Vergina
- Lowest elevation: 340 m (1,120 ft)

Population (2021)
  - Community: 136
- Time zone: UTC+2 (EET)
  - Summer (DST): UTC+3 (EEST)

Sykia (Greek: Συκιά) is a village in northern Greece, part of the Veroia municipality in Imathia, Central Macedonia.
