= Eirinoupoli =

Eirinoupoli Ειρηνούπολη
- Municipal unit
- Location within the regional unit

- Location within Greece
- Coordinates: 40°41′N 22°12′E
- Country: Greece
- Administrative region: Central Macedonia
- Regional unit: Imathia
- Municipality: Naousa

Area
  - Municipal unit: 50.0 km^{2} (19.3 sq mi)
- Elevation: 25 m (82 ft)

Population (2021)
  - Municipal unit: 3,484
  - Municipal unit density: 69.7/km^{2} (180/sq mi)
- Time zone: UTC+2 (EET)
  - Summer (DST): UTC+3 (EEST)
- Vehicle registration: ΗΜ

Eirinoupoli (Greek: Ειρηνούπολη) is a former municipality in Imathia, Central Macedonia, Greece. Since the 2011 local government reform it is part of the municipality Naousa, of which it is a municipal unit. The municipal unit has an area of 49.962 km^{2}. Population 3,484 (2021). It has 5 villages (Angelochori, Ano Zervochori, Kato Zervochori, Polyplatanos and Archangelos). Its elevation is 25 meters (82 feet).
