= Giannitsa Lake =

Former lake of Greece

- Loudias Lake
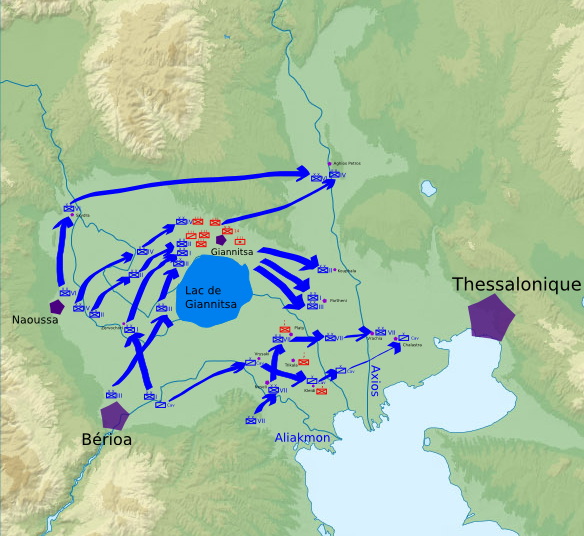
- Map depicting the Battle of Giannitsa around the lake.

- Location within Greece Location within North Macedonia
- Interactive map of Giannitsa Lake
- Location: Macedonia (Greece)
- Coordinates: 40°42′31″N 22°25′07″E
- Type: Post-glacial lake
- Etymology: Named after the town of Giannitsa.
- Primary inflows: Loudias River
- Primary outflows: Loudias River
- Surface area: c. 40.5 km^{2} (15.6 sq mi)
- Settlements: Giannitsa

Giannitsa Lake (Greek: Λίμνη Γιαννιτσών), also known as Loudias Lake (Greek: Λίμνη Λουδία) is a former post-glacial lake in Central Macedonia, Greece, south of the town of Giannitsa and north of Gidas (later renamed Alexandreia). It or the surrounding marshland were sometimes called Borboros 'slime' or Borboros Limen. Shallow, swampy, and variable-sized, it was drained from 1928 to 1932 and became agricultural land.

== History ==
It was fed by the Loudias River and the plain of Roumlouki stretched to its south.

In Bulgarian the lake was called Enidzhevardarsko Lake (Ениджева̀рдарското езеро) or Pazarsko Swamp (Пазарското блато).

The Lake played a major role in the Macedonian Struggle between the Greeks and Bulgarians, as it provided hiding places for the armed bands of both sides. The conflict for control of the Lake is the central historical event of Penelope Delta's 1937 novel The Secrets of the Swamp.

The lake was drained in 1928-1932 by the New York Foundation Company.

== Gallery ==
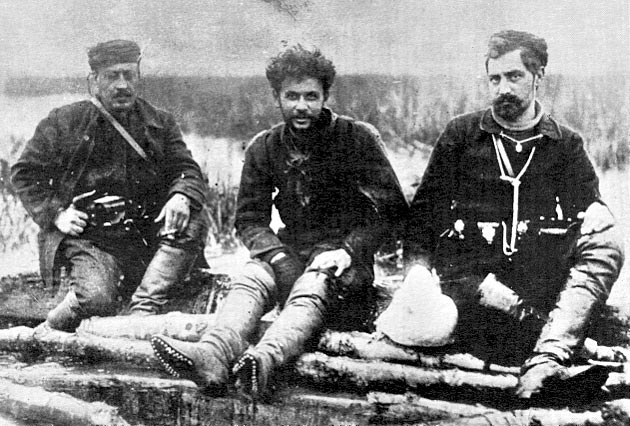
Greek revolutionaries Tellos Agras and Ioannis Demestichas at Giannitsa Lake c. 1906

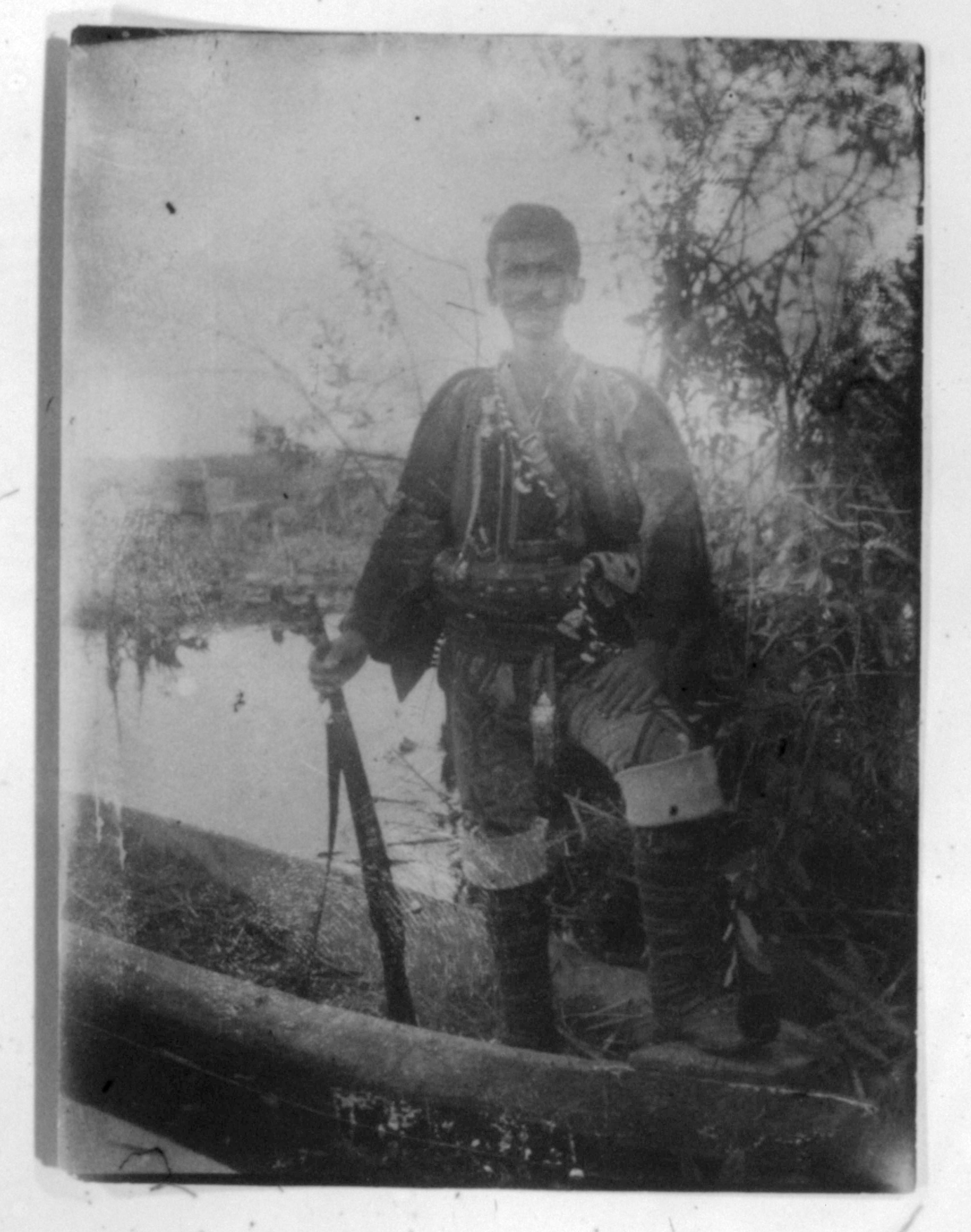
Bulgarian revolutionary Apostol Petkov at Giannitsa Lake c. 1906
