= Antigonides =

Antigonides Αντιγονίδες
- Municipal unit
- Location within the regional unit

- Location within Greece
- Coordinates: 40°36′N 22°20′E
- Country: Greece
- Administrative region: Central Macedonia
- Regional unit: Imathia
- Municipality: Alexandreia

Area
  - Municipal unit: 57.9 km^{2} (22.4 sq mi)

Population (2021)
  - Municipal unit: 3,836
  - Municipal unit density: 66.3/km^{2} (172/sq mi)
- Time zone: UTC+2 (EET)
  - Summer (DST): UTC+3 (EEST)
- Vehicle registration: ΗΜ

Antigonides (Greek: Αντιγονίδες) is a former municipality in Imathia, Greece. Since the 2011 local government reform it is part of the municipality Alexandreia, of which it is a municipal unit. The municipal unit has an area of 57.874 km^{2}. Population 3,836 (2021). The seat of the municipality was in Kavasila.
