= Selia =

Selia may refer to:

- Selja, an island in Norway known as Selia in Latin
- Ano Seli, a village in Greece known as Selia de Sus ("Upper Selia") in Aromanian
- Kato Vermio, a village in Greece known as Selia de Jos ("Lower Selia") or simply Selia in Aromanian
