= Pierian Mountains =

Mountain range in Central Macedonia, Greece

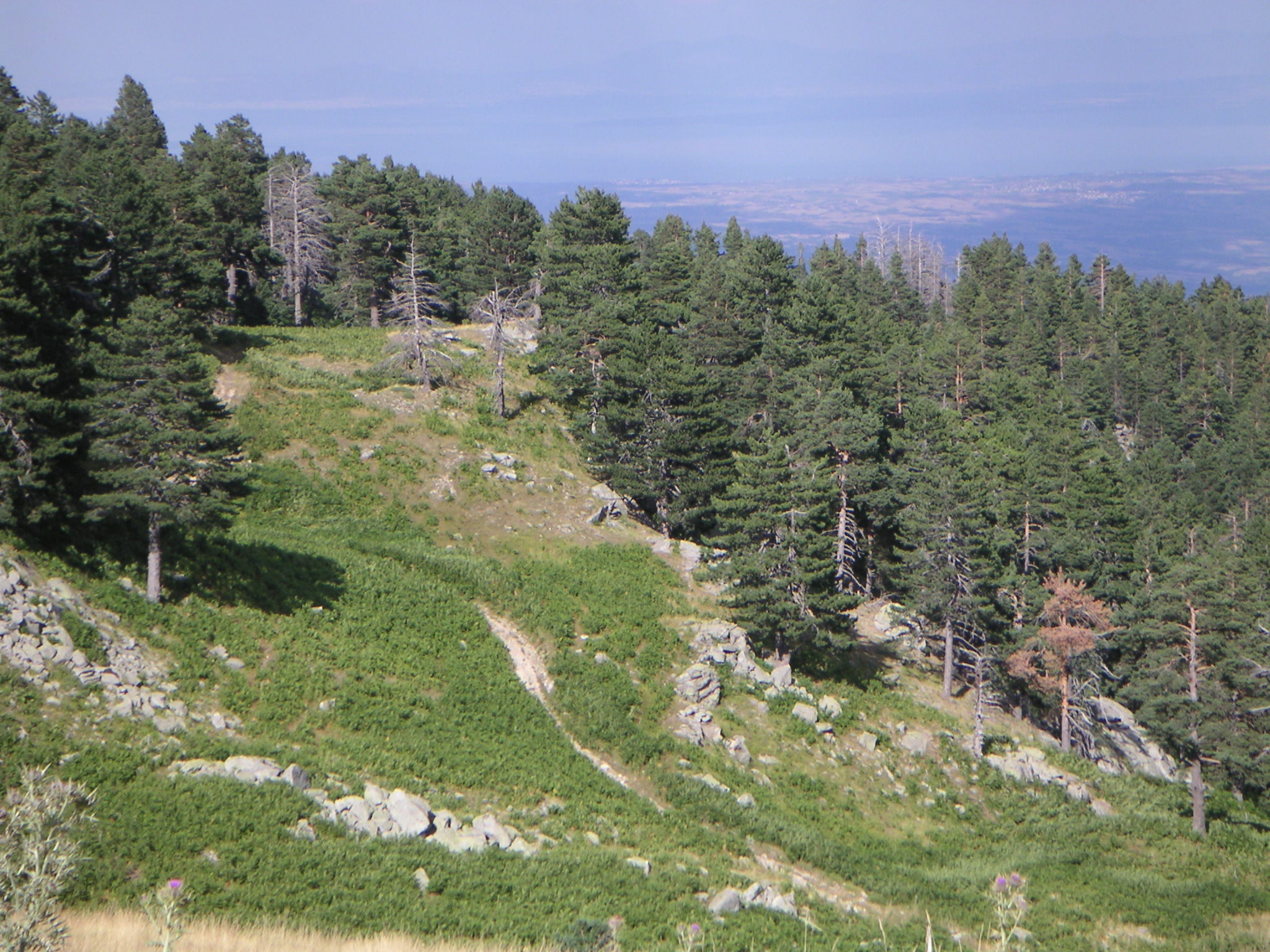
- Sarakatsana location on the Pierian Mountains

Highest point
- Elevation: 2,193 m (7,195 ft)
- Coordinates: 40°14′06″N 22°10′39″E

Geography
- Location within Greece
- Location: Greece
- Parent range: Natural border between Central Macedonia and West Macedonia

The Pierian Mountains (or commonly referred to as Piéria) are a mountain range between Imathia, Pieria and Kozani Region, south of the plain of Kampania in Central Macedonia, Greece. The village of Vergina, where the archaeological site of ancient Aigai lies, is built at the foot of these mountains. The highest point in the range is Flampouro at 2,193m (7,195 feet). The Pierian Mountains are the site of the ski resort of Elatochori. They also have two mountaineering refuges, at 1000m and 1680m.

== Flora ==
Pierian Mountains are known for their rich flora, mainly for their deciduous forests as well as for some rare species of wild flowers. The mountains are lush with rich and diverse vegetation made of dense forests of beech, oak and chestnut, black and red pines; while shrubs and deciduous trees are found at the lowest levels.

== Accidents ==
On 17 December 1997, a Yakovlev Yak-42 of Aerosvit Airlines, operating the route from Odesa, Ukraine to Thessaloniki, lost contact with the airport's air traffic control and during the second attempt the aircraft crashed in the Pierian mountains, near Mount Olympus. A total of 70 people, passengers and crew, 41 of which were Greeks, were killed.

== Gallery ==
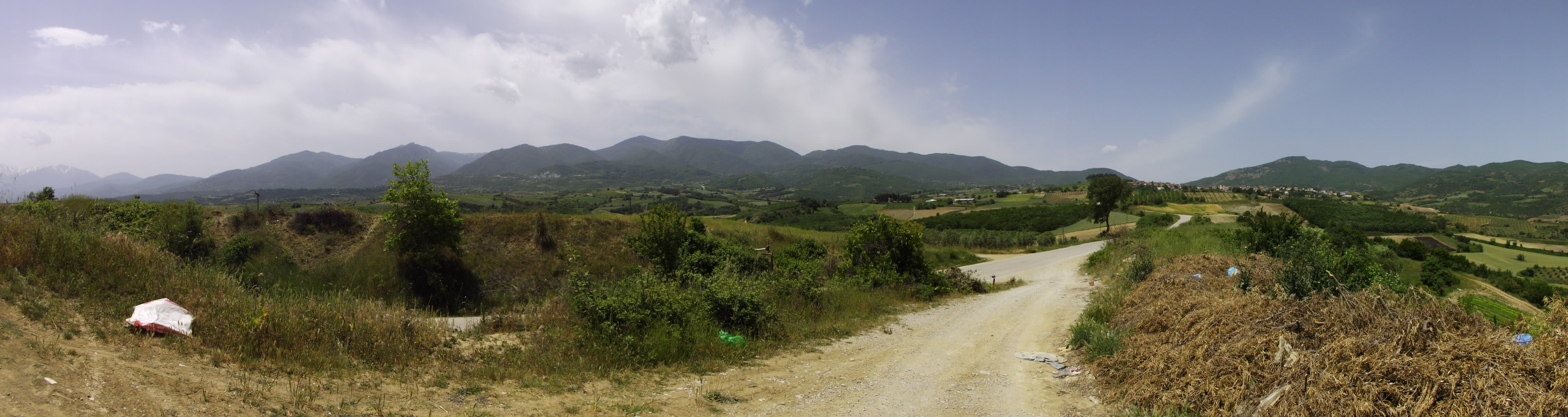
Panorama of the Pierian Mountains looking South West to West.
