= Vermio Mountains =

Mountain range in northern Greece

Vermio
- Βέρμιο
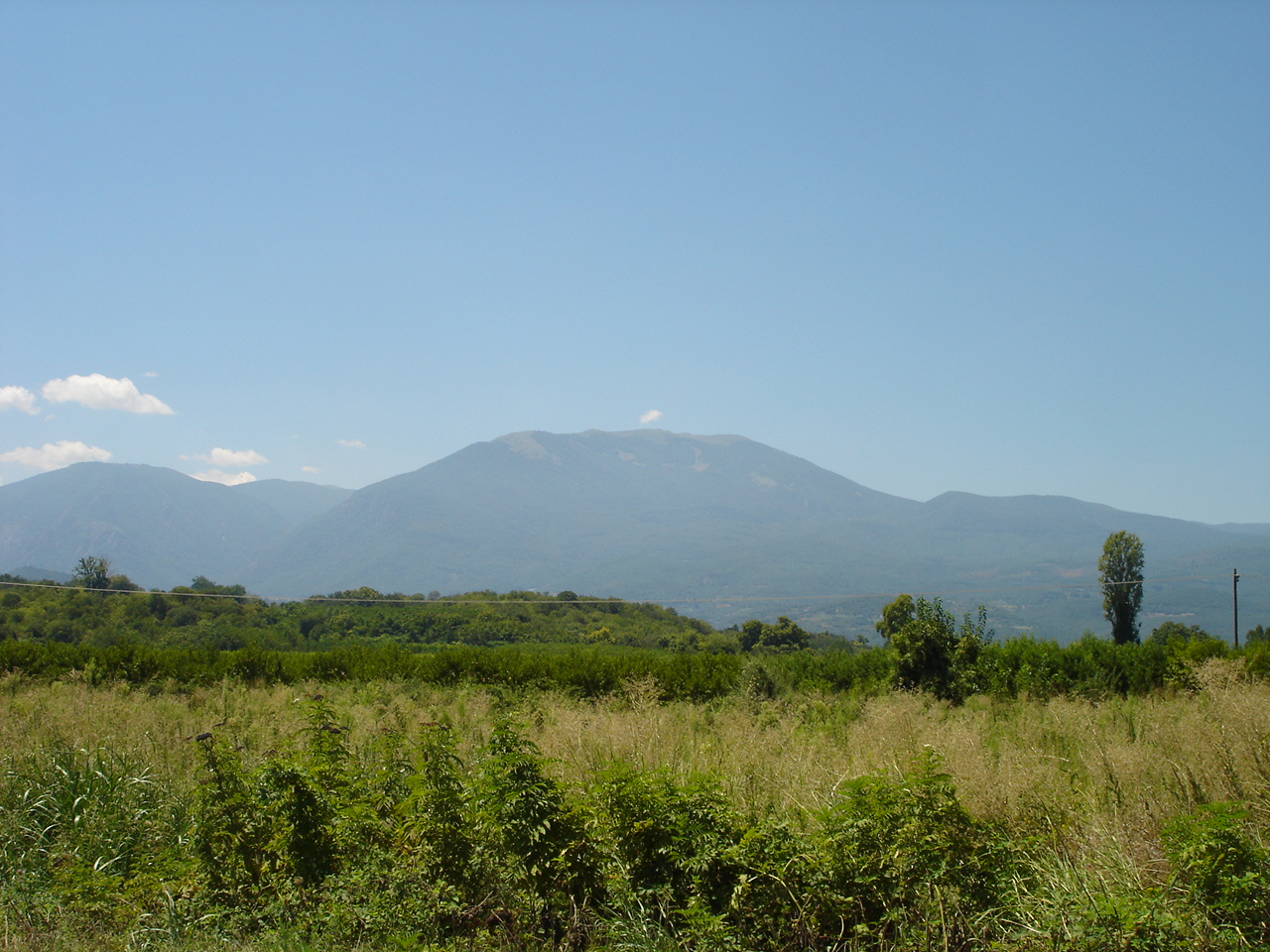

Highest point
- Elevation: 2,067 m (6,781 ft)
- Prominence: 1,361 m (4,465 ft)
- Listing: Ribu
- Coordinates: 40°37′39″N 21°56′15″E

Geography
- Location within Greece
- Location: Imathia, Greece

The Vermio Mountains (Greek: Βέρμιο), known in antiquity as the Bermion (Greek: Βέρμιον), is a mountain range in northern Greece. It lies between the Imathia Regional Unit of the Central Macedonia Region and the Kozani Regional Unit of the Western Macedonia Region. The range is west of the plain of Kampania. The town of Veria, which is the capital of Imathia, is at the base of these mountains. The highest point in the range is Chamitis peak (Greek: Χαμίτης), 2,065 metres (6,775 ft) elevation, west of Naousa.In Turkish the mountain is known as Karatash (Karataş), and in the Bulgarian it is known as Karakamen (Каракамен).

The Vermio Mountains are the site of ski resorts such as Seli and Tria Pente Pigadia.

It was mentioned in antiquity by Pliny, Strabo, Stephen of Byzantium, Hierocles, Ptolemy, and Thucydides and Herodotus. In classical times the mountain was thought by Herodotus to be impassible and according to tradition, paradise was on the other side. During Hellenistic times was an internal boundary of the Macedonian state.

== Gallery ==
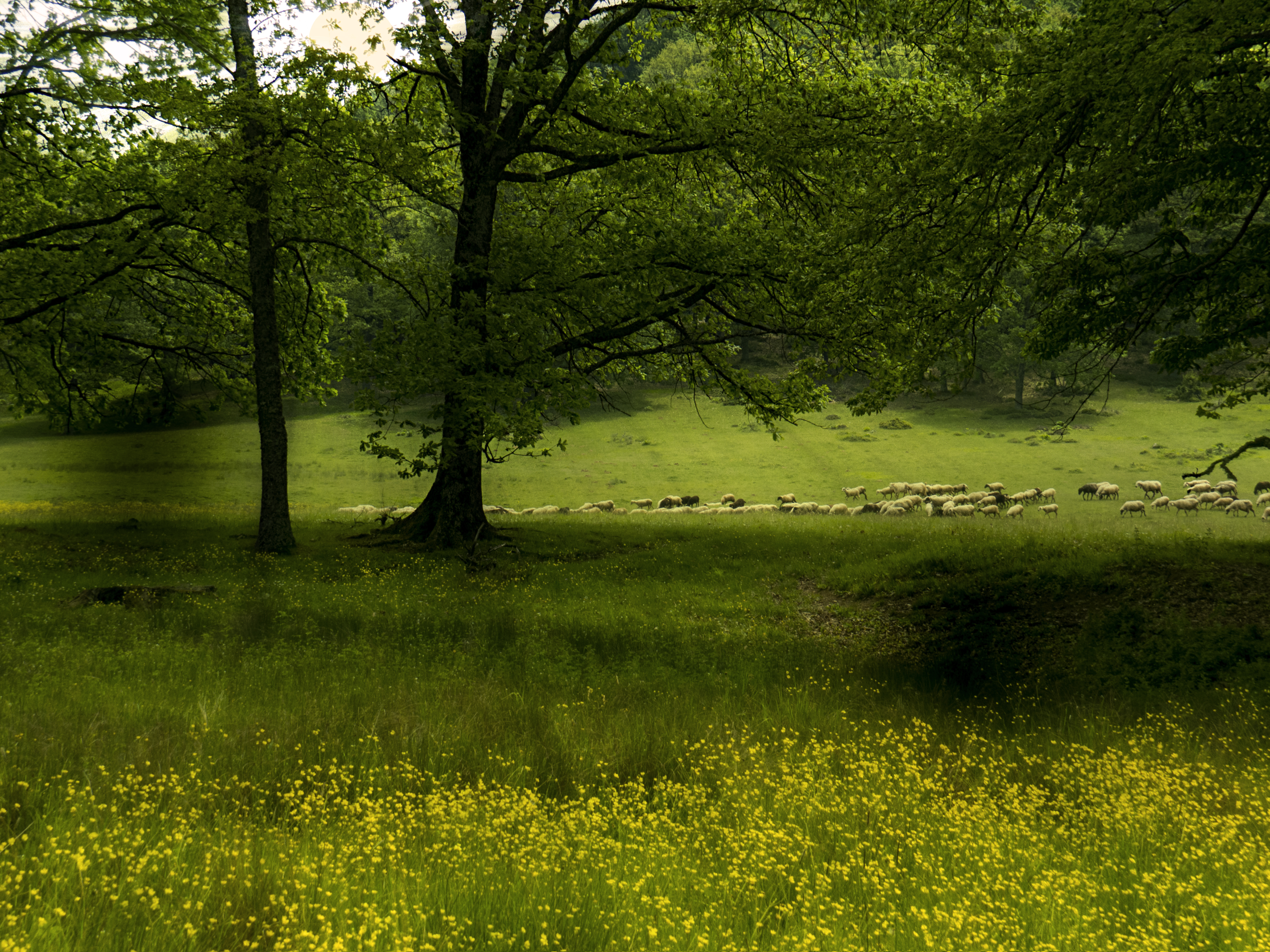
Landscape
