= Imathia Province =

Former province in Greece

Imathia Province Επαρχία Ημαθίας
- Province of Greece
- 2006
- Capital: Veroia

Imathia Province was one of the provinces of the Imathia Prefecture, Greece. Its territory corresponded with that of the current municipalities Alexandreia and Veroia. It was abolished in 2006.
