= Meliki =

Meliki Μελίκη
- Municipal unit
- Location within the regional unit

- Location within Greece
- Coordinates: 40°31′N 22°24′E
- Country: Greece
- Administrative region: Central Macedonia
- Regional unit: Imathia
- Municipality: Alexandreia

Area
  - Municipal unit: 99.0 km^{2} (38.2 sq mi)

Population (2021)
  - Municipal unit: 6,350
  - Municipal unit density: 64.1/km^{2} (166/sq mi)
  - Community: 2,838
- Time zone: UTC+2 (EET)
  - Summer (DST): UTC+3 (EEST)
- Vehicle registration: ΗΜ

Meliki (Greek: Μελίκη) is a village and a former municipality in Imathia, Greece. Since the 2011 local government reform it is part of the municipality Alexandreia, of which it is a municipal unit. The municipal unit has an area of 98.962 km^{2}. Population 6,350 (2021). Meliki is near Vergina, the place where the tomb of Philip II of Macedon was discovered.
