= Platy, Imathia =

Platy Πλατύ
- Municipal unit
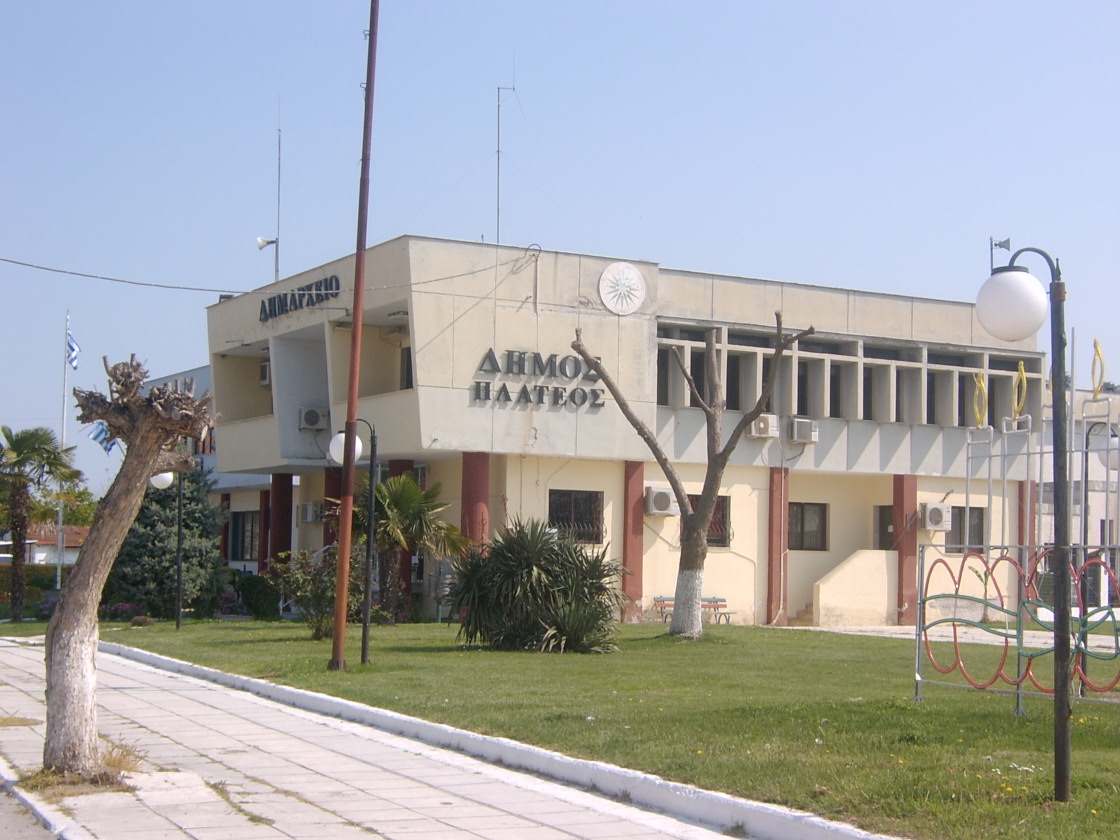
- Town hall of Plati

- Location within the regional unit

- Location within Greece
- Coordinates: 40°38′N 22°31′E
- Country: Greece
- Administrative region: Central Macedonia
- Regional unit: Imathia
- Municipality: Alexandreia

Area
  - Municipal unit: 181.4 km^{2} (70.0 sq mi)
- Elevation: 10 m (33 ft)

Population (2021)
  - Municipal unit: 7,978
  - Municipal unit density: 43.98/km^{2} (113.9/sq mi)
  - Community: 1,658
- Time zone: UTC+2 (EET)
  - Summer (DST): UTC+3 (EEST)
- Postal code: 590 32
- Area code: 23330
- Vehicle registration: HM

Platy (Greek: Πλατύ) is a town and a municipality in eastern Imathia, Greece. Since the 2011 local government reform it is part of the municipality Alexandreia, of which it is a municipal unit. The municipal unit has an area of 181.375 km^{2}.

== History ==
Platy was founded in 1924 by Greek refugees from Turkey after the Asia Minor Catastrophe. They came from the villages of the Farassa area in Cappadocia (today the village in Turkey is called Çamlıca (Faraşa) in Yahyalı Province of Kayseri). After many stops on their journey, their final destination was Platy. Before Platy was founded, there was a small village strategically near a railway station. It was 35 km from Veria, 40 from Thessaloniki and 512 from Athens. When Platy was founded it remained a small village with 2,300 inhabitants (as a separate community) but with a very important role in the area of Imathia. In the industrial area of Platy until the mid-1990s there were over 1,500 workers from Platy, Veria and Thessaloniki. However, after the economic crisis of 1999-2002, many of the factories based in the industrial zone of Platy were closed. Today there are only three factories, one of them being of national importance (the sugar state-owned factory "EBZ" or the Hellenic Sugar Industry S.A.). Some other small factories are based in the same industrial zone. In 1994, Platy absorbed three smaller communities and in 1998 another nine. Today, Platy is the centre of the municipal unit of Platy (about 8,000 inhabitants). The town has a population of about 1,700.

== Subdivisions ==
The municipal unit Platy is subdivided into the following communities (constituent villages in brackets):

- Platy (Platy, Ergotaxio Loudia)
- Arachos
- Kleidi
- Koryfi (Koryfi, Neochoropoulo, Palaiochora)
- Lianovergi (Palaiochori)
- Platanos
- Prasinada (Prasinada, Kydonia, Niselloudi)
- Trikala

== Population ==
Year	Community	Municipal unit
1951	2,315	10,350
1961	2,063	10,410
1971	1,970	10,206
1981	2,367	11,064
1991	2,498	11,304
2001	2,299	11,128
2011	2,084	9,614
2021	1,658	7,978

== Transport ==
=== Road ===
Platy can be accessed by bus or car (following the A1/E75 or A2/E90 motorways).

=== Rail ===
The settlement is served by Platy railway station at the junction of the Piraeus–Platy Line and Thessaloniki–Bitola Line. The station is served by intercity trains between Athens and Thessaloniki, and by Proastiakos Thessaloniki services to Katerini and Larissa, Edessa, Florina and Thessaloniki.

=== Air ===
There have been recent discussions about upgrading the old military airport 2 km NW of Platy for civil use.

== See also ==
- List of settlements in Imathia
