= Loudias =

River of Macedonia, Greece

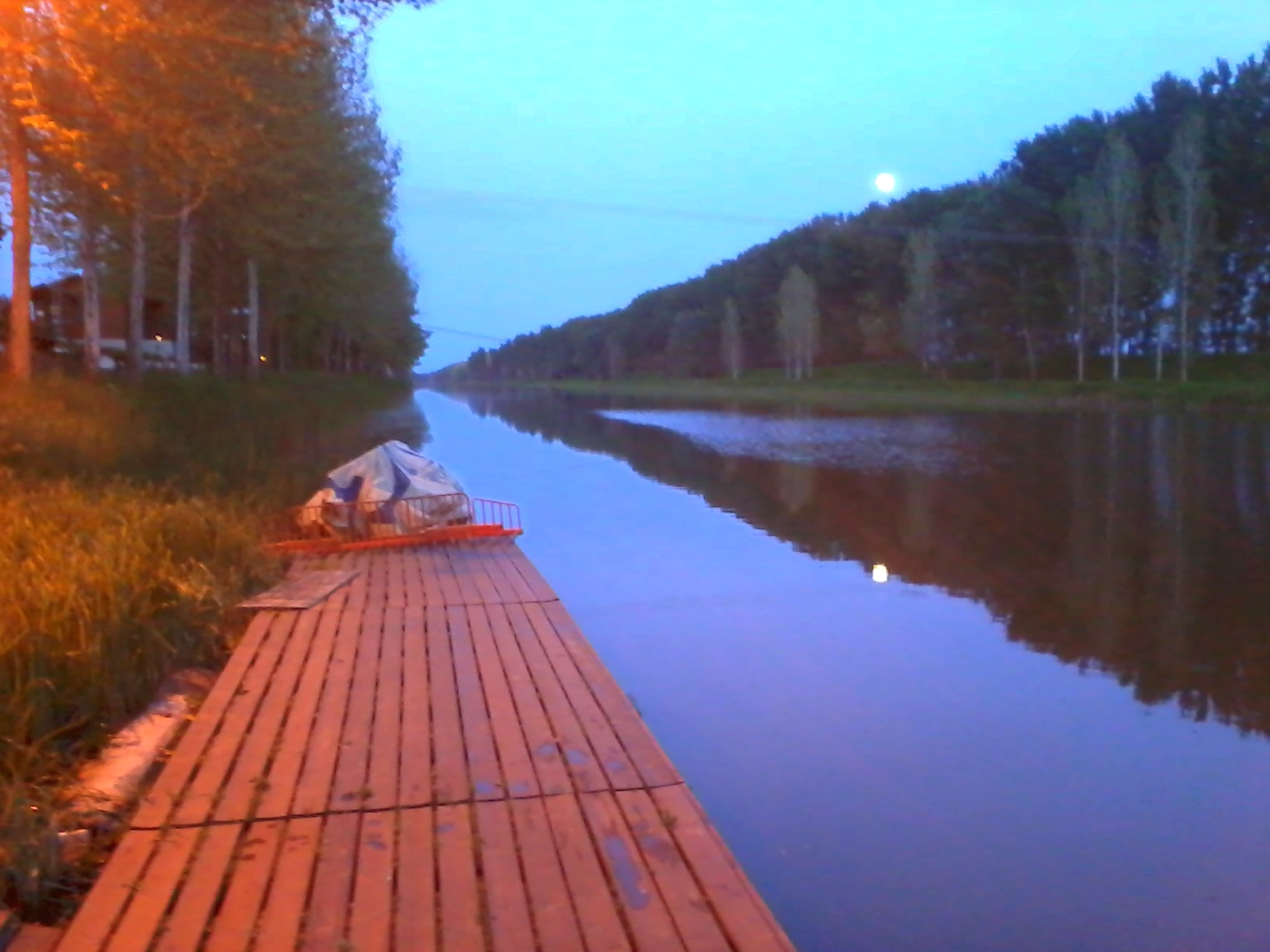
- Native name: Λουδίας (Greek)

Location
- Country: Greece

Physical characteristics
- Mouth
  - location: Thermaic Gulf
  - coordinates: 40°31′50″N 22°40′49″E
- Basin size: 1,251 km^{2} (483 sq mi)

The Loudias (Greek: Λουδίας) or Lydias (Λυδίας), popularly called Mavroneri (Μαυρονέρι, "Blackwater", from its Ottoman Turkish name Kara Asmak قره آصماق) is a river in Central Macedonia that flows through the regional units of Pella and Thessaloniki draining into the Thermaic Gulf through the Axios Delta National Park. Its drainage basin is 1,251 km^{2} (483 sq mi).

== Changes in river flow ==
In the past water from the Voras, Vermio and Paiko mountains, flowed into Giannitsa Lake and from there flowed to the Thermaic Gulf. The Loudias now collects water that comes mainly from Mount Paiko and the main source is close to Aravissos. A section of the river has been converted into an artificial channel (Channel 66-Moglenitsas), thus enabling the draining of Lake Giannitsa and its marshlands. Throughout the length of about 60 km, the region is fertile. At the city of Giannitsa there is a rowing centre. In 1912, during the First Balkan War, this area became the site of the Battle of Giannitsa.

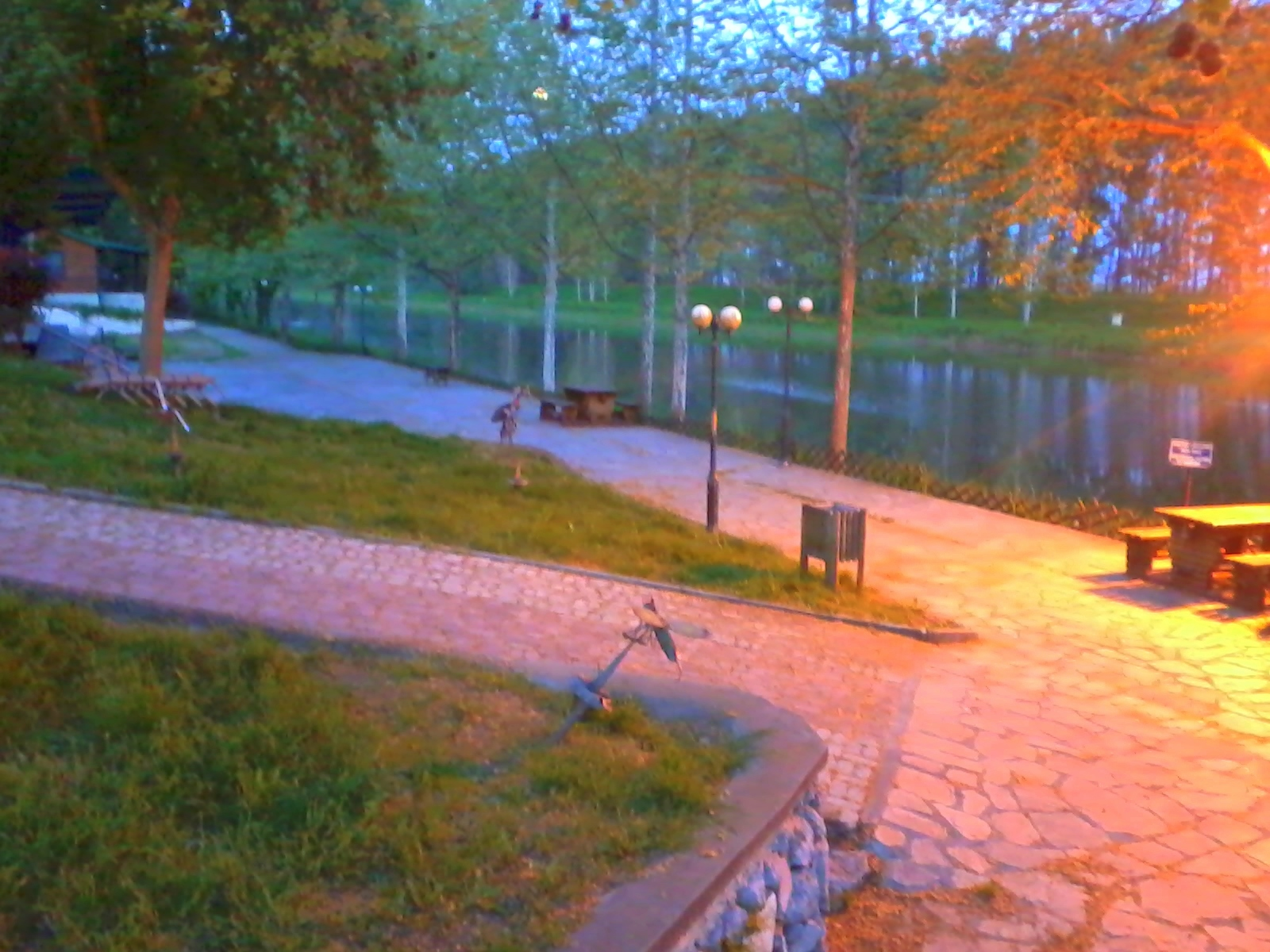
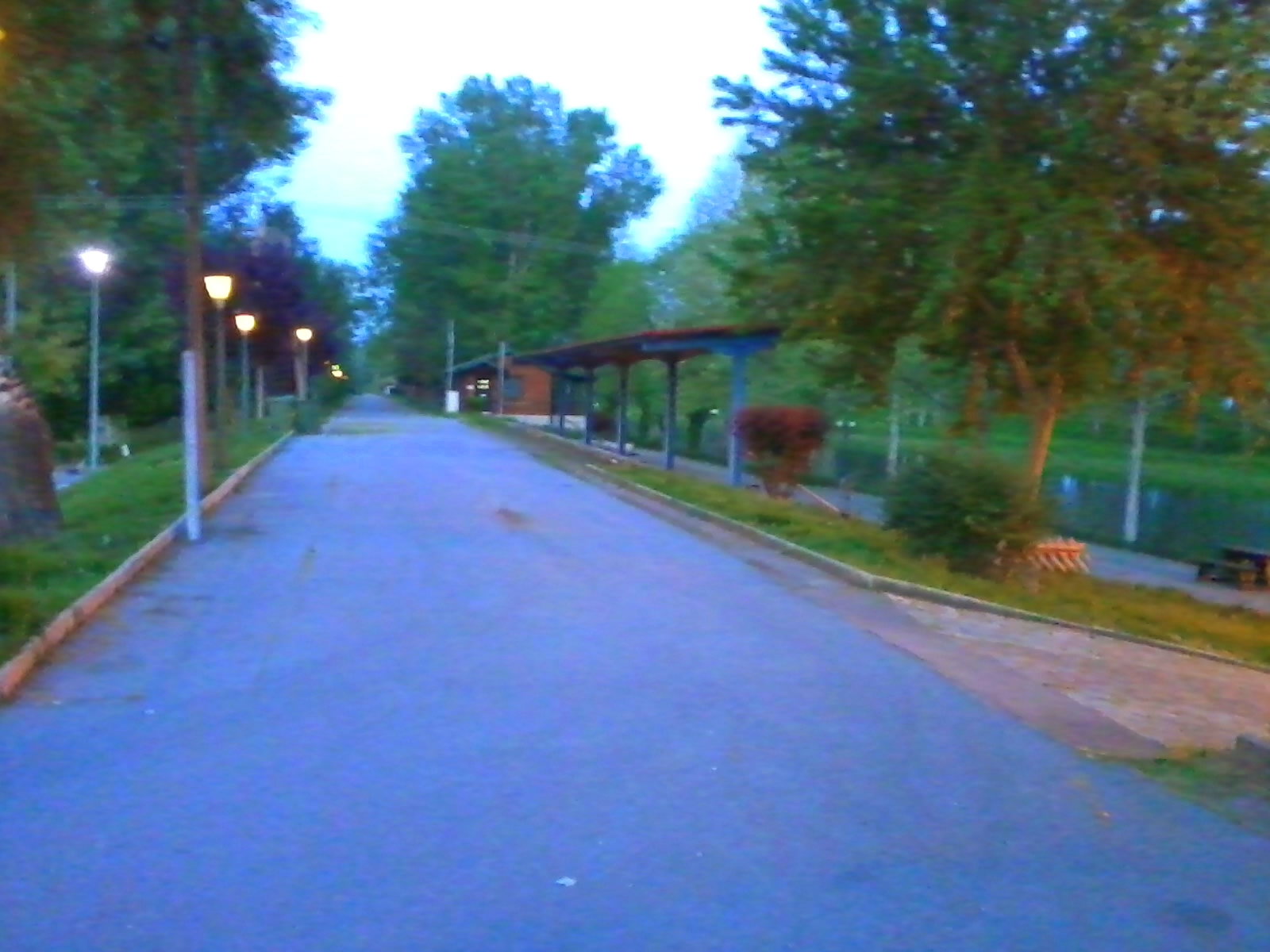
