= Alexandreia, Greece =

City in Macedonia, Greece

Alexandreia Αλεξάνδρεια
- Municipality
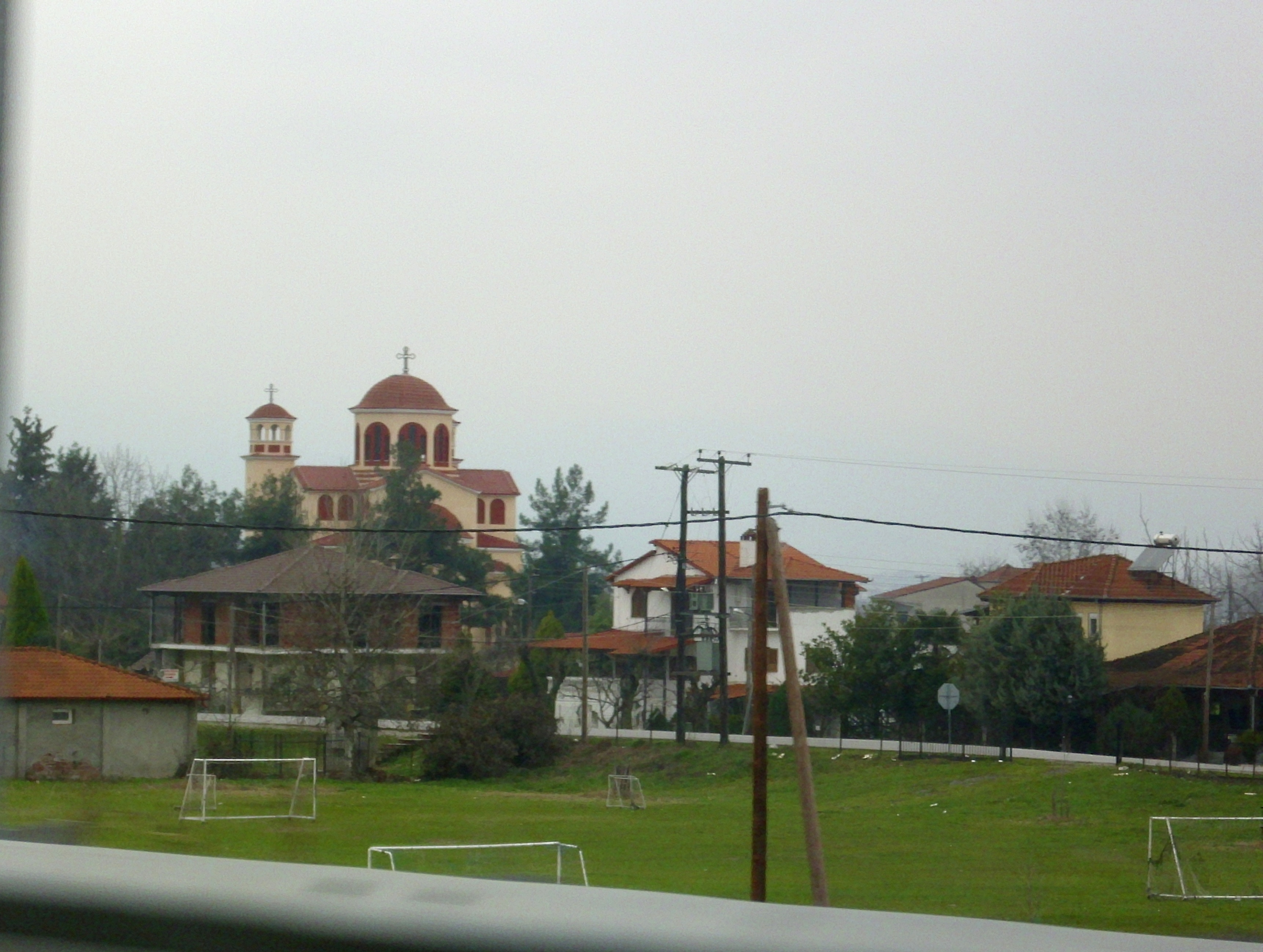

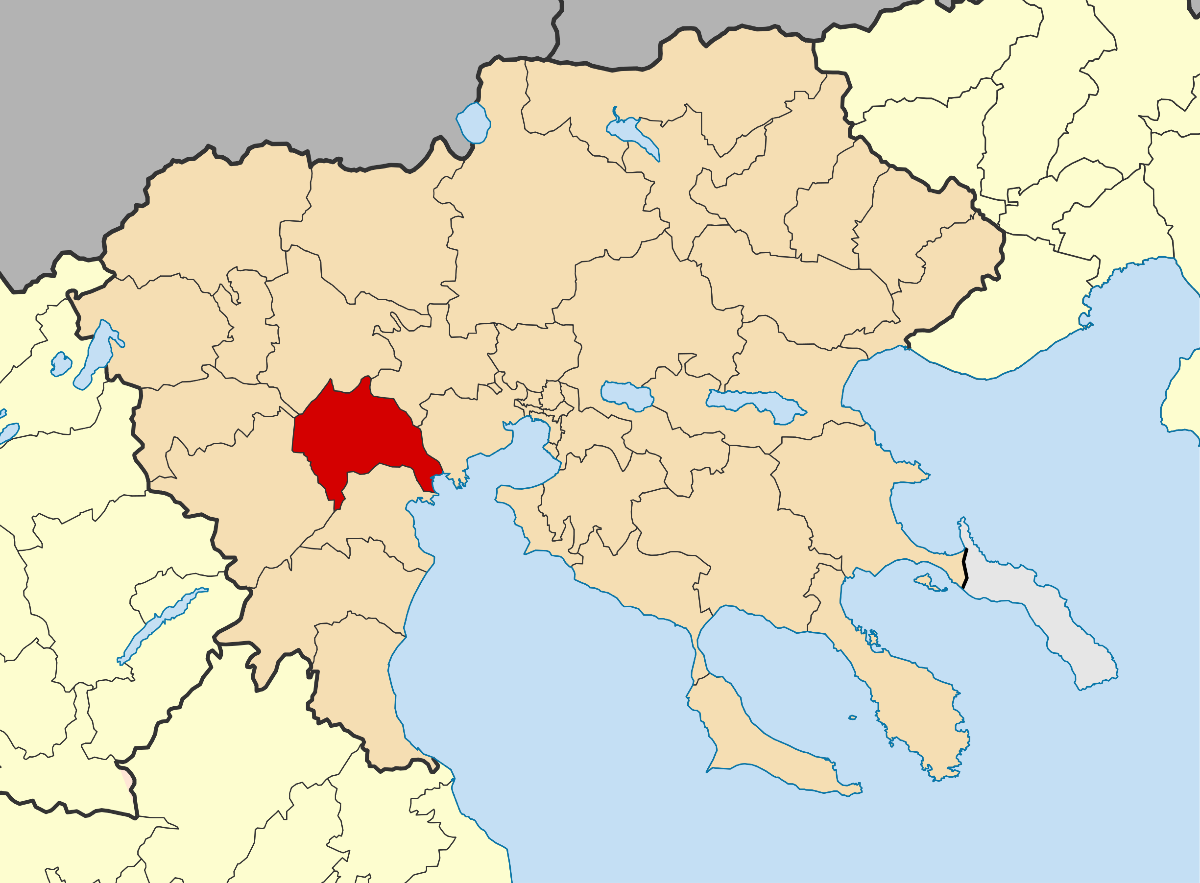
- Location within the region

- Location within Greece
- Coordinates: 40°38′N 22°27′E
- Country: Greece
- Administrative region: Central Macedonia
- Regional unit: Imathia

Government
  - Mayor: Panagiotis Gyrinis

Area
  - Municipality: 478.8 km^{2} (184.9 sq mi)
  - Municipal unit: 140.6 km^{2} (54.3 sq mi)
- Elevation: 10 m (33 ft)

Population (2021)
  - Municipality: 38,292
  - Density: 79.97/km^{2} (207.1/sq mi)
  - Municipal unit: 20,128
  - Municipal unit density: 143.2/km^{2} (370.8/sq mi)
  - Community: 15,906
- Time zone: UTC+2 (EET)
  - Summer (DST): UTC+3 (EEST)
- Postal code: 59300
- Area code: 23330
- Vehicle registration: ΗΜ
- Website: www.alexandria.gr

Alexandreia or Alexandria (Greek: Αλεξάνδρεια, Alexándreia, IPA: [ale'ksaŋðria]), known as Gidas before 1953 (Γιδάς, Gidàs, IPA: [ʝi'ðas]), is a city in the Imathia regional unit of Macedonia, Greece. Its population was 15,906 at the 2021 census. Alexandreia is a rapidly developing city focusing to boost its economy through agriculture, merchandising, alternative tourism and other alternative actions.

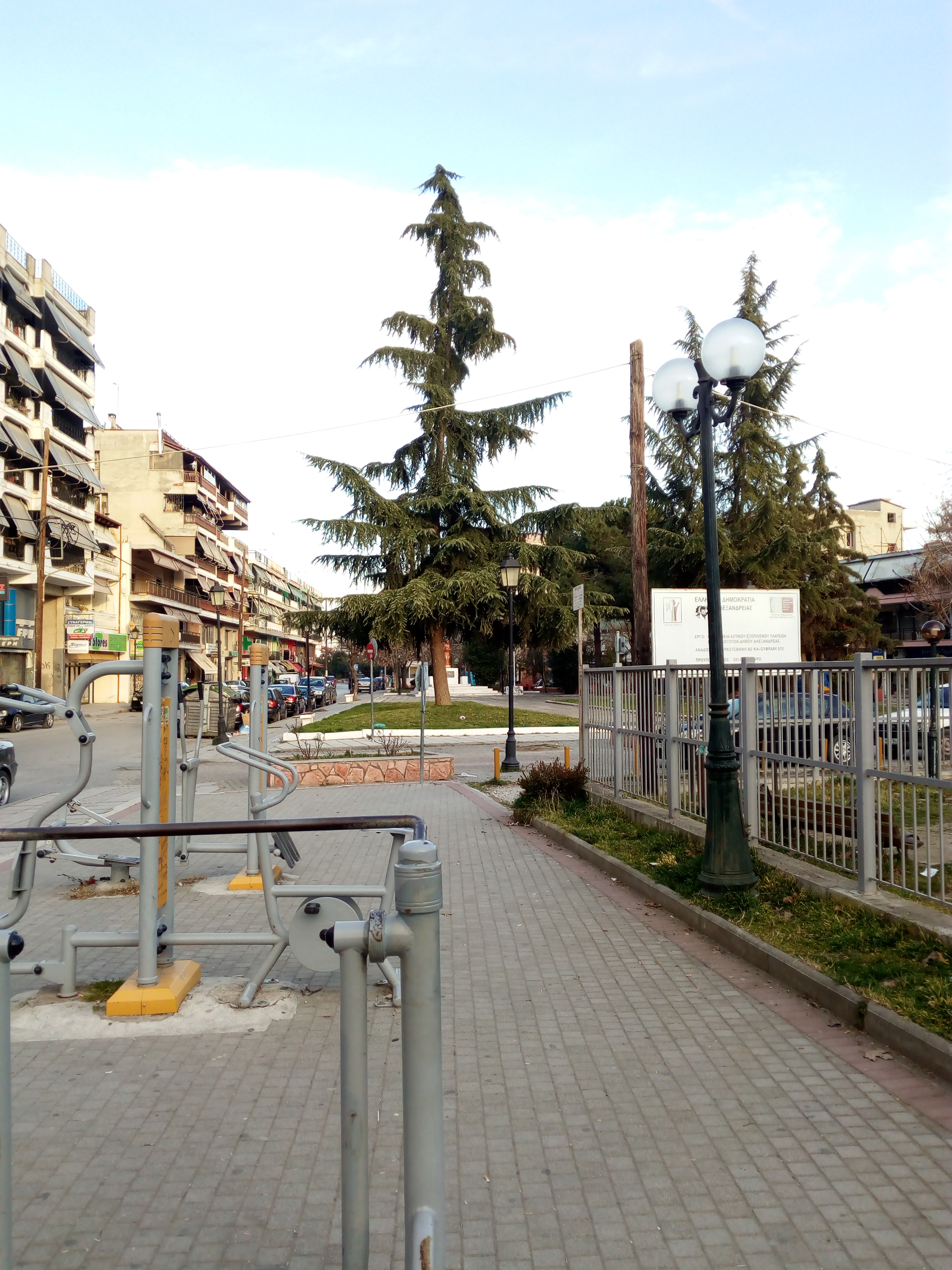
A park in Alexandreia

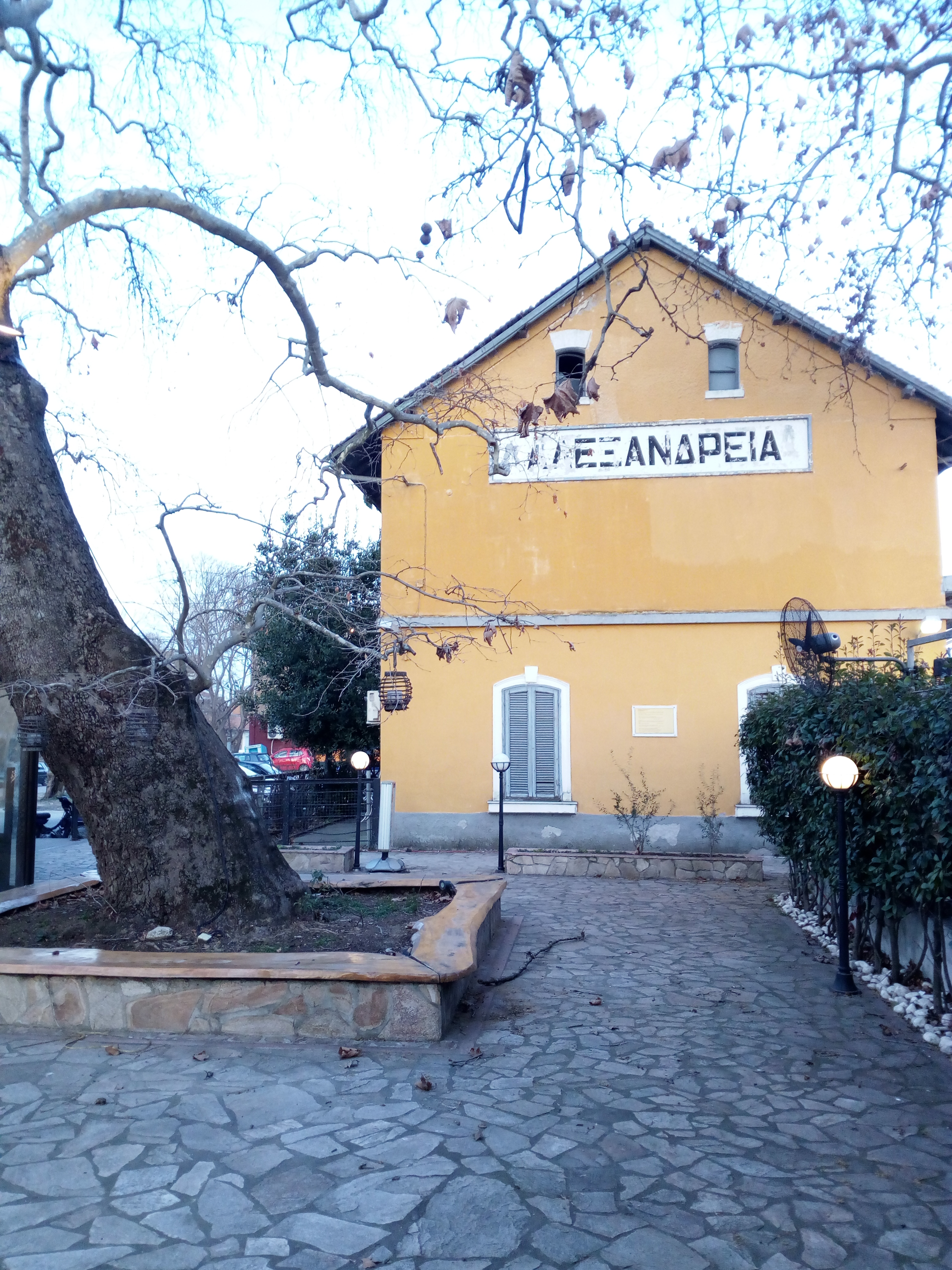
Railway station

== Geography ==
Alexandreia is a located in the vast plain north of the river Aliakmonas and west of the river Axios, named Kampania or also Roumlouki. Its economy is chiefly based on the agricultural utilization of the surrounding fields. The area around Alexandreia has the greatest production of peaches in Greece and apples, pears, tobacco, and cotton are also grown at large. Its elevation is 10 m above mean sea level. Alexandreia is 19 km south of Giannitsa, 23 km northeast of Veroia and 42 km west of Thessaloniki.

=== Municipality ===
The municipality Alexandreia was formed at the 2011 local government reform by the merger of the following 4 former municipalities, that became municipal units:

- Alexandreia
- Antigonides
- Meliki
- Platy

The municipality has an area of 478.825 km^{2}, the municipal unit 140.614 km^{2}.

== History ==
=== Ottoman era: 14th–20th centuries ===
The area where Alexandreia is located today is called Imathia, which is also the name of the prefecture, but it is also known as Kampania or Roumlouki. The area was conquered by the Ottoman Empire during the late 14th century and was then called Roumlouki by the Ottomans. The first possible mention of Alexandreia as a settlement in history was on a Tapu Tahrir of 1530 under the name of Kato-Gode. However, the same name is absent from a map of the area from 1650.

The first solid evidence of a settlement is in an Ottoman tax list (tahrir defterleri) of 1771, which records the settlement of Gidas as the feudal estate of the family of Gazi Evrenos. According to this tax list, Gidas would be charged with 1900 aspers, which would render it the largest village in the area at that time with a probable population of 400 people. There are numerous mentions of Gidas in the following centuries, including the visit of the local Church of St. Athanasios by Cosmas the Aetolian in 1775 as a part of his missionary tours.

Gidas was the largest village in the area of Roumlouki, although the area was generally sparsely populated throughout the centuries. Under Ottoman rule, they paid heavy taxes, and as a consequence there was a general resentment towards the Ottomans. The local people were allowed to keep their religion and language, that is they were mostly Orthodox Christians and spoke the Greek language, although many people converted to Islam to gain the privileges granted to Muslims. As a rural area and feudal property, Gidas's people were mostly peasants and animal husbandmen, although there were also merchants trading all local kinds of commodities, and there was a school.

==== 19th century – 1912 ====
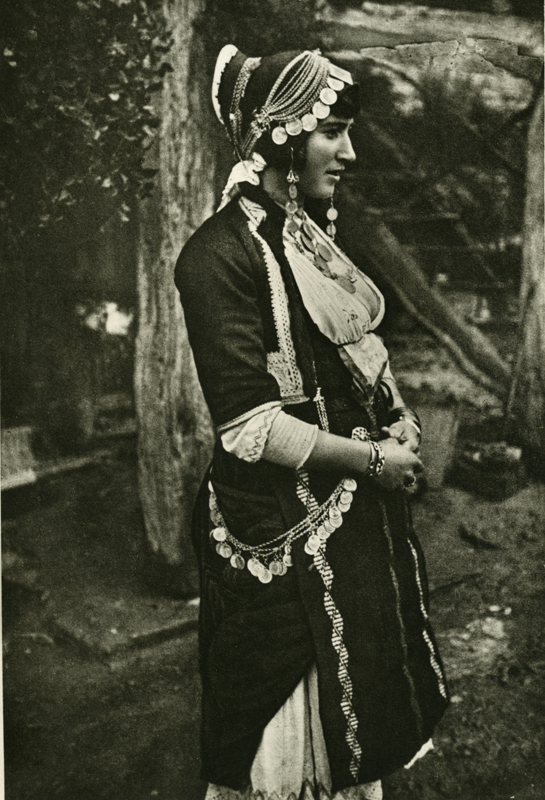
Married woman from Alexandreia, early 20th century (Collection of the Peloponnesian Folklore Foundation, Nafplio).

In 1821, the Greek War of Independence broke out in the Peloponnese, and by 1832, Greece was independent. However, Macedonia was not annexed to Greece until the First Balkan War in 1912–1913. During the 19th century, the economic ascent of Thessaloniki and of the other urban centers of Macedonia coincided with the cultural and political renaissance of the Greeks. The ideals and patriotic songs of liberated Greece had made a profound impression upon the Macedonians. However, it was not until the end of the century that the revolutionary fervor of the southern Greeks started spreading to these parts.

Meanwhile, the Ottomans had resorted to military rule, which provoked further resistance, and also led to economic dislocation and accelerated population decline. Ottoman landholdings, previously fiefs held directly from the Sultan, became hereditary estates (Chifliks), which could be sold or bequeathed to heirs. The new class of Ottoman landlords reduced the Greek farmers to serfdom, leading to depopulation of the plains, to the escape of many people to the mountains, and to usury, in order to escape poverty.

Despite the general agitations in Greece and Macedonia as well as the redeployment of Slavic and Albanian forces and populations in the area, the Greeks living in Roumlouki were isolated and secured from the outer conflicts, and as thus they preserved their traditional lifestyle, their morals and customs and their costumes. As far as Gidas is concerned, in the first half of the 19th century, reports of Gidas are rare. In his work Travels in Northern Greece (1835), Topographer William Martin Leake mentioned travelling from Thessaloniki, through Jedha (Gidas), on his way to Veroia in 1806, setting Gidas as a location within the route Thessaloniki-Veroia. In 1812, physician Sir Henry Holland confirmed the existence of Gidas as a settlement, while travelling over the same route.

Reports of Gidas are richer at the end of the century. The 1875's Ottoman cadastre refers to the Chiflik of Gidahor (Gidas) with an area of 19.328 acres (7.822 ha). The owner of the chiflik from 1875 to 1898 was Pasha Mehmed Şefik, who was also a distant descendant of Gazi Evrenos. From that cadastre, it is known that at least 150 families, of mostly farmers and shepherds, resided in Gidas, and there were also a few shops and an inn, meeting the needs of the dwellers and travelers.

In the years that followed, especially after the foundation of the Supreme Macedonian Committee in 1895, the Bulgarian committees, located in Macedonia, were in turmoil with the Greek freedom fighters over the dominance of Macedonia, when it was realized that this part would be the next territorial loss of the Ottoman empire. These conflicts led to the events of the Macedonian Struggle that lasted for four years (1904-1908), in which the area of the Roumlouki played an important role at the outcome of the Struggle. More particularly, many guerrillas born or living in Gidas, called Macedonomachoi, participated actively in those conflicts, most notably including Koungas Theocharis (chieftain), Koukouloudis Thomas (second-class spy), Matopoulos Apostolos (chieftain), Moschopoulos Antonios (priest-teacher) and Perifanos Georgios (soldier).

The Young Turk revolution ended the Macedonian Struggle, however skirmishes among the Greeks, the Bulgarians and the Young Turks continued in following years. On 9 October 1912, the first Balkan War was officially declared and very soon after, the Greek Army released the town of Gidas from the Ottoman domination on 18 October. More particularly, in the previous morning, on 17 October, the 3rd infantry half-company marched from Veroia to Gidas with the aid of the local Makedonomachos Koungas Theocharis and camped outside Gidas, intimidating that way the Turk soldiers, who fled the town. The next day, on October 18, the VII Cavalry Division of the Greek Army entered the town freeing the people of Gidas. Because of these two-day events, there has been conflict whether the town was freed on 17 or 18 October. However, the official day of the Liberation of Gidas is considered to be 18 October 1912.

=== Modern period: after the war 1912 ===
After Greece conquered Gidas in 1912, the town constituted an autonomous community for the first time on 9 September 1918, under the Provisional Government of National Defence based in Thessaloniki, and was appended to the prefecture of Thessaloniki. The liberation was also followed by a general confusion about the spatial arrangement of the newly acquired land. In 1919, the former chiflik of Gidas was expropriated for the first time and re-distributed to the people of the town. After the Greco-Turkish War of 1919–1922 and the population exchange between Greece and Turkey, 40 refugee families settled in Gidas and the need for their rehabilitation led to a second distribution of the land to the people. In 1932, the lake of Giannitsa, near which Gidas was located, was drained by the New York Foundation Company and, in 1936, a third re-distribution of land followed. The on end spatial arrangement led to the continuously unfair dispersion of land to the people, which was resolved with the fair distribution of 3 acres (1 ha) to each dweller in 1937. Finally, in 1950, a second expropriation of 1400 fields took place with the following allocation of 14 acres (6 ha) to new farmers residing in Gidas.

After the draining of the lake of Giannitsa in 1932, thousands of fertile fields became available, which supported the local people and led to the general development of the area. Soon, an extended irrigation network was constructed, which allowed the cultivation of a large variety of agricultural products. In addition to the local development, the all along current location of the Roumlouki fields, serving as a junction between Thessaloniki and the Western Macedonia as well as the Southern Greece, constituted an attraction for internal migration and a push for strong economic progress.

In the census of 1920, Gidas had a population of 844 people, and a rapid population growth is being observed ever since until today. Soon, the first public services would be staffed aiding the needs of the town and the surrounding communities. In 1931, the local settlements were distributed and the land was demarcated definitively, changing forever the urban planning of the town. In 1941, Gidas is detached from the prefecture of Thessaloniki and is appended to the prefecture of Imathia. After the end of the Second World War and by 1946, many immigrant families from the Western Macedonia moved and settled in Gidas. During the same period, a large number of Romani populations started appearing in Gidas, and today they constitute the largest minority group in Alexandreia.

During the decade of 1950, the town planning and the economy of Gidas saw drastic changes. All the buildings, houses, utility rooms, shops, schools and even churches of the old village of Gidas were either replaced by new constructions and multi-storey buildings or succumbed to the ravages of time. The town center was moved closer to the historical building of the railway station, which connected and until nowadays connects the cities of Thessaloniki and Veroia by rail, and Gidas would further on be an example of a town with a basic center of commercial nature. The only 19th century buildings still standing in Alexandreia are Pasha Mehmed Şefik's Konak (1875) and the railway station (1894). During the service of the first elected mayor of Gidas, Ioannis Petridis, the electrification of the town's households took place for the first time.

In 1952, the town council suggested the renaming of Gidas to Alexandreia on the grounds that the town was a commercial and communication center in the middle of a largely populated rural area as well as due to the proximity of the town to the birthplace of Alexander the Great, whose name had not been used to name any other place in Greece. Gidas was officially renamed to Alexandreia a year after, in 1953.

During the last half century, Alexandreia was rapidly developed and urbanized. This development was not without any public implications. More particularly, the city had major problems with water supply and sewerage for decades, however, those problems have already been resolved to a great extent today.

Alexandreia is situated in the middle of a lush lowland with extremely fertile land, which is the base of its economy. More specifically, its economy is based on the abundance of agricultural products, namely cotton, peaches, sugar beets, tobacco, apricots, apples, corn, cereals, and numerous vegetables, that leads to the powerful, local, agricultural production, which is largely exported, while a major part of it drives the local industrial enterprises.

However, despite the fact that Alexandreia's economy is chiefly based on the agricultural production of the surrounding area, the city's always current position at a road intersection has also established it as a major commercial center to the local area. This leads as a result to the constant growth of its population and, therefore, to its continuous reconstruction and the steady expansion of the city plan, which provides the character of a modern city. The sewerage network, whose construction lasted for a long time, is complete and functional, which is expected to be a milestone for the further development of the city. There are almost all the fundamental public services in the city, including a health center, serving its residents. There is also a large market with numerous shops, supermarkets, cafeterias, pubs and taverns. In close proximity to the city, there is an old airport, which has the capacity for the airlift of the local, agricultural products. There are plans for its exploitation, which is expected to give a special boost to the local economy.

== Transport ==
=== Road ===
The A1 and A2 (Egnatia Odos) motorways pass through the municipality. The Greek National Roads EO1 and EO4 pass through the town. Alexandria is served by the KTEL of Imathia, with frequent local and long-distance routes.

=== Rail ===
Alexandreia is served by a railway station on the railway from Thessaloniki to Florina, which was inaugurated in 1894. Since 2008 it is served by the Thessaloniki Suburban Railway, which connects the city with Thessaloniki and Edessa. Platy railway station (on the important railway from Thessaloniki to Athens) is also situated in the municipality of Alexandreia, however, there is no direct link between Platy and Alexandreia.

== Notable people ==
- Vasilios Tsiartas, footballer
- Charalampos Giannopoulos, basketball player
- Georgios Koutsias, footballer
- Dimitrios Charitopoulos, basketball player
