= Imathia =

Imathia Περιφερειακή ενότητα Ημαθίας
- Regional unit
- Municipalities of Imathia

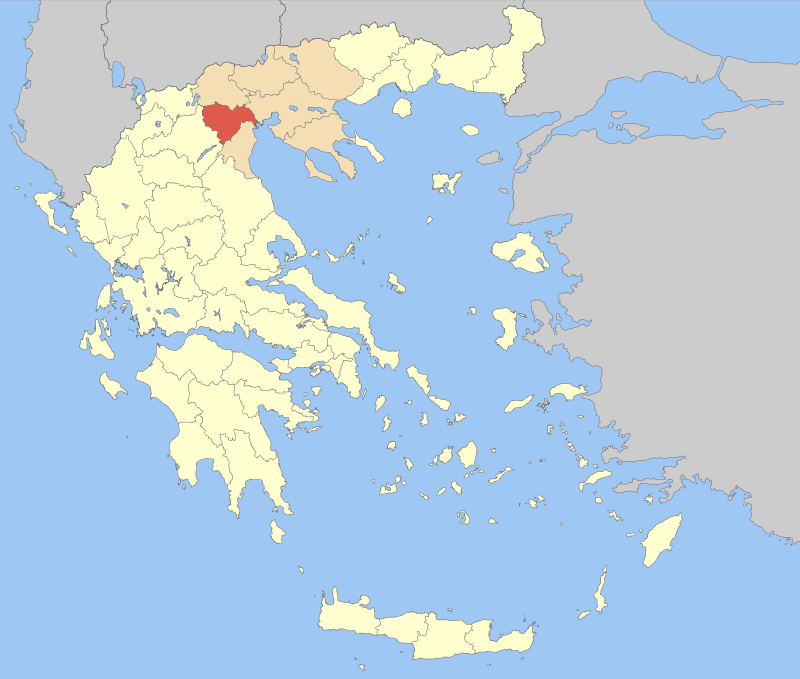
- Imathia within Greece

- Location within Greece
- Coordinates: 40°35′N 22°15′E
- Country: Greece
- Administrative region: Central Macedonia
- Seat: Veroia

Area
  - Total: 1,701 km^{2} (657 sq mi)

Population (2021)
  - Total: 131,001
  - Density: 77.01/km^{2} (199.5/sq mi)
- Time zone: UTC+2 (EET)
  - Summer (DST): UTC+3 (EEST)
- Postal code: 59x xx
- Area code: 233x0
- Vehicle registration: HM
- Website: imathia.pkm.gov.gr

Imathia (Greek: Ημαθία [imaˈθia]) is one of the regional units of Greece. It is part of the region of Central Macedonia, within the geographic region of Macedonia. The capital of Imathia is the city of Veroia.

== Administration ==
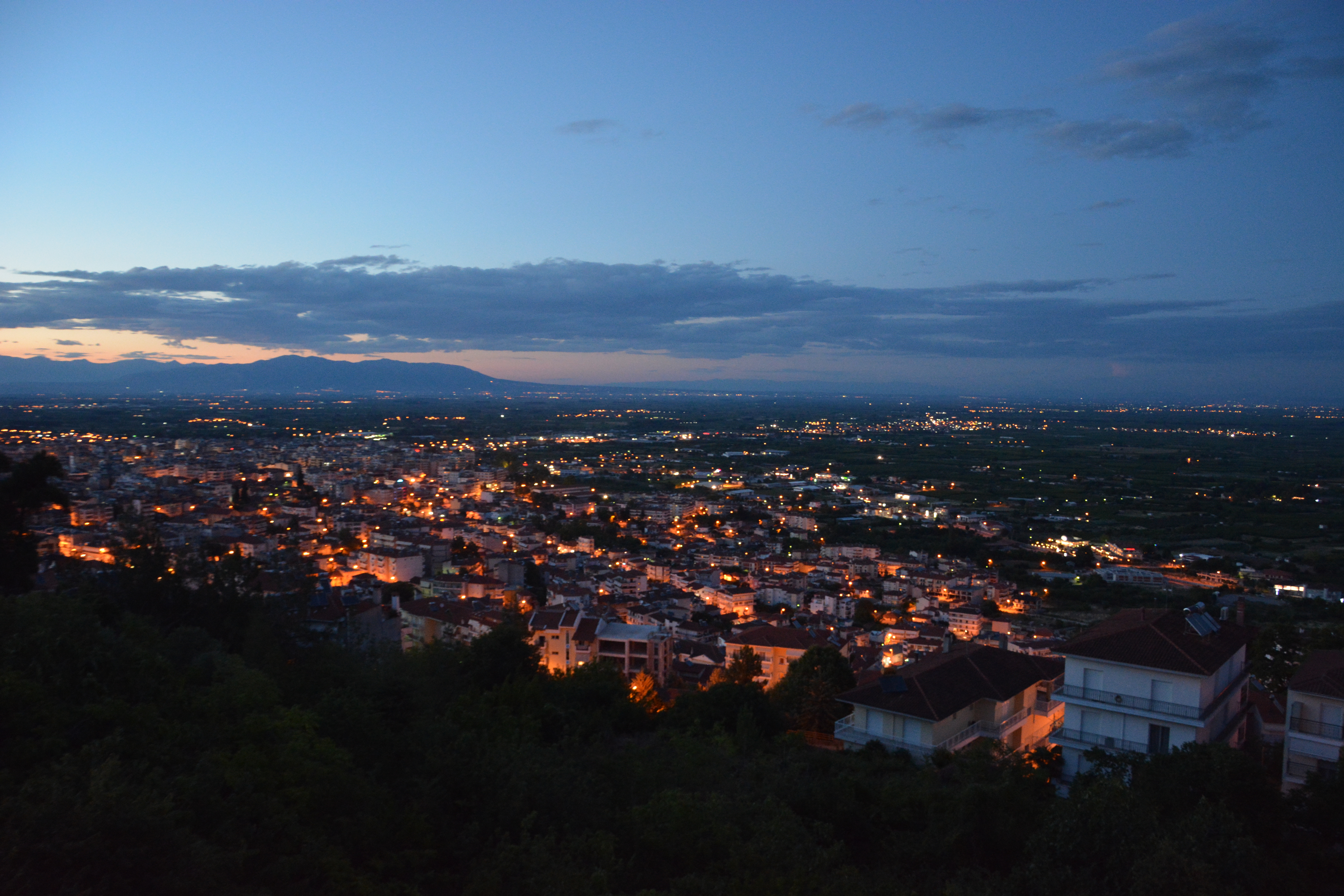
Veria

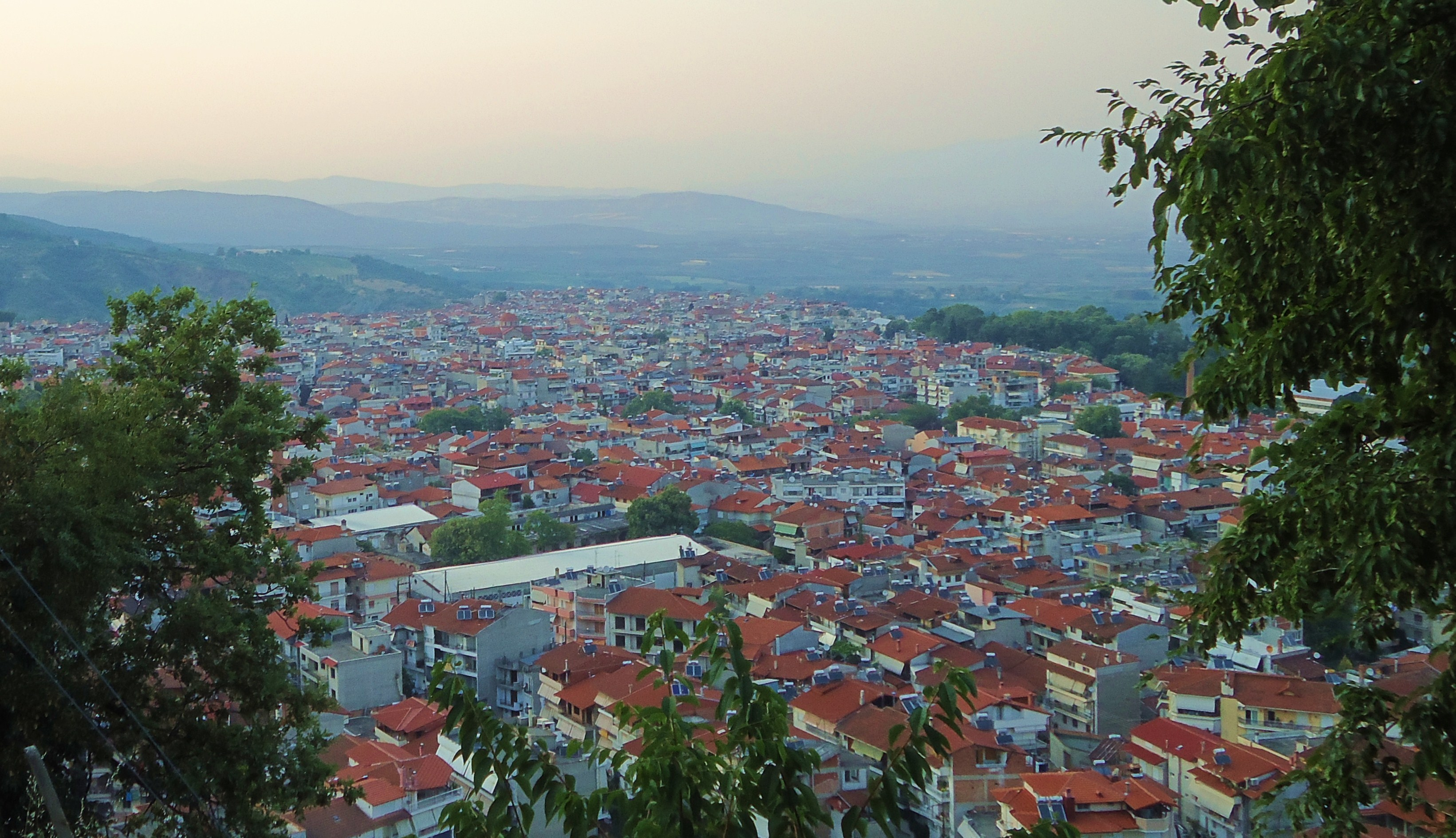
Naousa

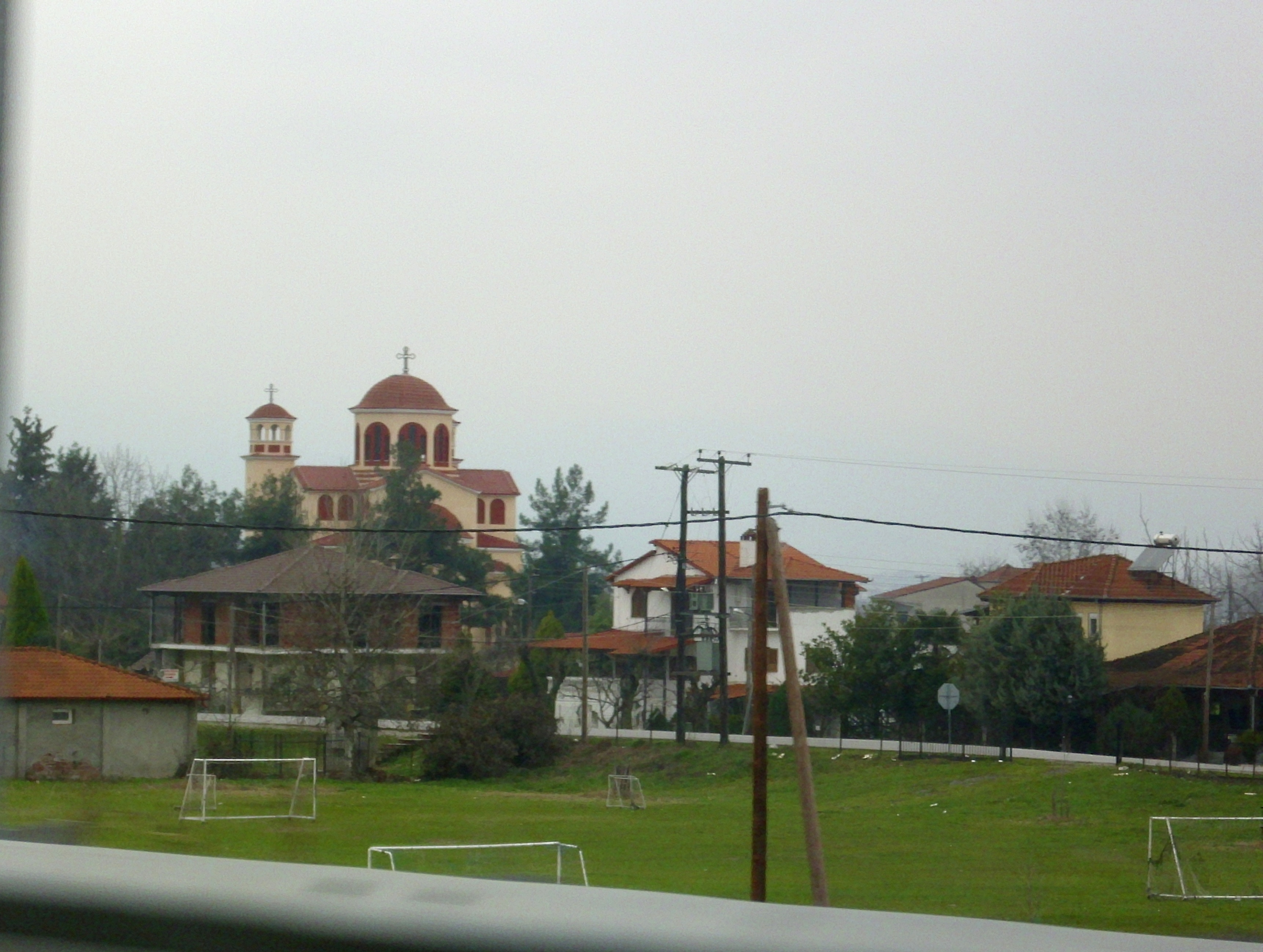
Alexandreia

The regional unit Imathia is subdivided into 3 municipalities. These are (number as in the map in the infobox):

- Alexandreia (2)
- Naousa (3)
- Veroia (1)

=== Prefecture ===
As a part of the 2011 Kallikratis government reform, the regional unit Imathia was created out of the former Imathia prefecture (Greek: Νομός Ημαθίας). The prefecture had the same territory as the present regional unit. At the same time, the municipalities were reorganised, according to the table below.

New municipality	Old municipalities	Seat
Alexandreia	Alexandreia	Alexandreia
Alexandreia	Antigonides	Alexandreia
Alexandreia	Meliki	Alexandreia
Alexandreia	Platy	Alexandreia
Naousa	Naousa	Naousa
Naousa	Anthemia	Naousa
Naousa	Eirinoupoli	Naousa
Veroia	Veroia	Veroia
Veroia	Apostolos Pavlos	Veroia
Veroia	Vergina	Veroia
Veroia	Dovras	Veroia
Veroia	Makedonida	Veroia

=== Provinces ===
The former prefecture of Imathia was subdivided into the following provinces:

Provinces of Imathia Prefecture	Seat
Imathia Province	Veroia
Naousa Province	Naousa

Note: Provinces no longer hold any legal status in Greece since 2006.

== Geography ==
The northeastern part of Imathia, along the lower course of the river Aliakmonas, is a vast agricultural plain known as Kampania or Roumlouki. The area is known for the production of fruit crops, such as peaches and strawberries. Much of the population lives in this plain, where the towns Alexandreia and Veroia are situated. Imathia has a short shoreline on the Thermaic Gulf, around the mouth of the Aliakmonas. The mountainous western part of Imathia is covered by the Vermio Mountains, reaching 2,052 metres near the city of Naousa. The Pierian Mountains reach into the southern part of Imathia, south of the Aliakmonas. The regional unit borders on Pieria to the south, Kozani to the west, Pella to the north and Thessaloniki to the east. Imathia has a mainly Mediterranean climate with warm, dry summers and mild, wet winters.

=== Transport ===
The Thessaloniki–Florina and Piraeus–Platy railways pass through Imathia, with the main train stations being in Platy, Alexandreia, Veria and Naoussa. The main roads passing through the regional unit are the A1 and A2 (Egnatia Odos) motorways, as well as the EO1 and EO4 national roads: the planned upgrade to the Veria–Edessa road axis, part of Imathia Provincial Road 1 and Pella Provincial Road 3, is partly built and incomplete. Alexandreia Airport is a military air base.

== History ==
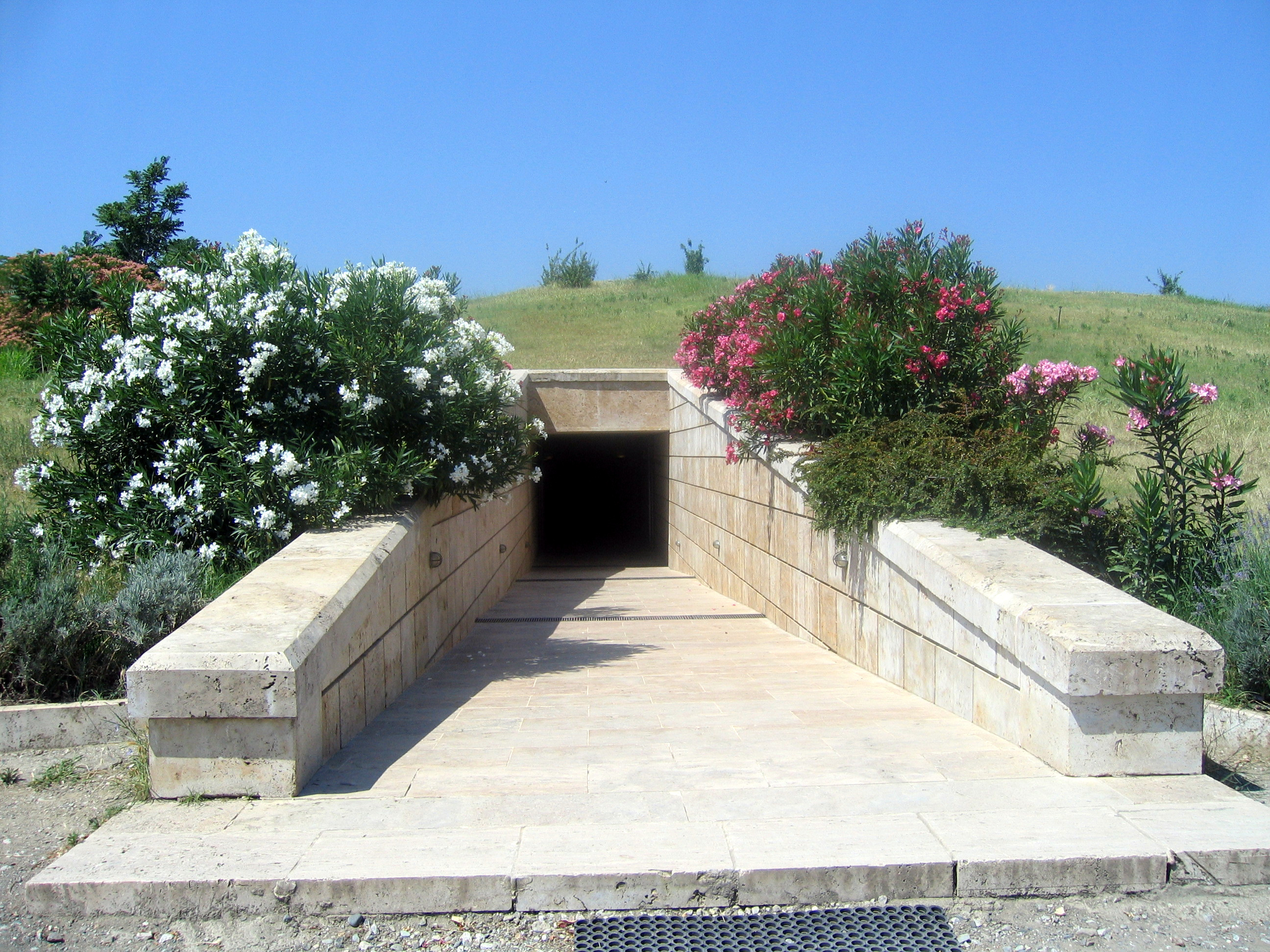
The entrance to the "Great Tumulus" at Vergina.

Imathia was named after the historic region Emathia, which was used by several classical authors as a synonym for Bottiaea or even all of Macedon. Important ancient towns in the area of present Imathia were Aigai, the original capital of the kingdom of the Makedones, and Beroea. As a part of the Macedonia region, it was ruled by the kingdom of Macedonia, the Roman Empire, the Byzantine Empire and from early 15th century by the Ottoman Empire. In 1913, as a result of the Second Balkan War, it became part of Greece. During and after the Greco-Turkish War (1919–1922), several refugees from Turkey settled in Imathia. Initially part of the prefecture of Thessaloniki, Imathia became a prefecture in 1946, and Veroia was selected as its capital.

== Media ==
=== Newspapers ===
- Agrotikoi Orizontes
- Elefthero Vima
- Epikaira Imathias
- Epta Imathias
- Imerisia
- Kerkida
- Laos
- Pliroforisi
- Macedonika Nea

== Culture ==
=== Museums ===
- Wine and Vine Museum (Naoussa)
- Archaeological Museum of Veroia
- Byzantine Museum of Veroia
- Folklore Museum of the Lyceum of Hellenic Women (Naoussa)

== Sports clubs ==
- Veria 1960 FC - Veria
- Pontioi Veria F.C. - Veria
- Naoussa F.C. - Naousa
- A.E. Alexandreia F.C. - Alexandreia

== See also ==
- Emathus
- Aegae (Macedonia)
- List of settlements in Imathia
- Former toponyms in Imathia Prefecture
- Roumlouki
