= Central Macedonia =

Administrative region of Greece

Central Macedonia Κεντρική Μακεδονία
- Administrative region
- Coordinates: 40.7°N 23.0°E
- Country: Greece
- Region: Macedonia
- Decentralized administration: Macedonia and Thrace
- Capital: Thessaloniki
- Regional units: List: Chalkidiki; Imathia; Kilkis; Pella; Pieria; Serres; Thessaloniki

Government
  - Governor: Nana Aidona (New Democracy)

Area
  - Total: 18,810.52 km^{2} (7,262.78 sq mi)

Population (2021)
  - Total: 1,795,669
  - Density: 95.46089/km^{2} (247.2426/sq mi)
- Demonym: Macedonian

GDP
  - Total: €32.902 billion (2024)
  - Per capita: €18,568 (2024)
- Time zone: UTC+2 (EET)
  - Summer (DST): UTC+3 (EEST)
- ISO 3166 code: GR-B
- HDI (2023): 0.891 very high · 8th of 13
- Website: www.pkm.gov.gr

Central Macedonia is one of the thirteen administrative regions of Greece, consisting the central part of the geographical and historical region of Macedonia. With a population of almost 1.8 million, it is the second most populous region in Greece after Attica. The capital and largest city of the region is Thessaloniki.

== Geography ==
The region of Central Macedonia is situated in Northern Greece, bordering the regions of Western Macedonia (west), Thessaly (south), Eastern Macedonia and Thrace (east), and bounded to the north at the international borders of Greece by the Republic of North Macedonia and Bulgaria. The southern part is coastal and is bathed by the Thermaic, Toroneos, Singitic and Strymonic gulfs. The largest city and capital of Central Macedonia is Thessaloniki. Serres is the second most populous city, followed by Katerini, Veria and Giannitsa. Central Macedonia is basically lowland and, with many rivers, is highly developed, both in the primary and the secondary sectors. The largest plain in Greece is situated in Central Macedonia. Thessaloniki, the metropolis of Macedonia, is Greece's second largest city. The highest mountains of the region of Central Macedonia are Mount Olympus (2,918 m.), Voras Mountains (2,524 m.), Pierian Mountains (2,193 m.), Vermio Mountains (2,065 m.) and Mount Athos (2,033 m.). The largest rivers are the Haliacmon, the Axios, the Loudias and the Gallikos (Echedoros), which all flow into the Thermaic Gulf, creating the Axios-Loudias-Aliakmonas National Park. Koroneia, Volvi, Doiran and Kerkini lakes are situated in Central Macedonia. The coasts are continuous, smooth, sandy and suitable for swimming (except the estuaries and the shores of the urban complex of Thessaloniki).

== Administration ==
The region was established in the 1987 administrative reform as the Central Macedonia Region (Greek: Περιφέρεια Κεντρικής Μακεδονίας, romanized: Periféria Kentrikís Makedonías). With the 2010 Kallikratis plan, its powers and authority were redefined and extended. Along with Eastern Macedonia and Thrace, it is supervised by the Decentralized Administration of Macedonia and Thrace, based in Thessaloniki. The region is based at its capital city of Thessaloniki and is divided into seven regional units (pre-Kallikratis prefectures), Chalkidiki, Imathia, Kilkis, Pella, Pieria, Serres and Thessaloniki. These are further subdivided into 38 municipalities.

Although geographically part of Central Macedonia, Mount Athos is not administratively part of the region, but an autonomous self-governing state under the sovereignty of Greece.

== Demographics ==
The region has shrunk by 90,039 people between 2011 and 2021, experiencing a population loss of 4.8%.

== History ==
The modern Greek region of Central Macedonia roughly corresponds to the ancient Greek region of Lower Macedonia, which included the core and the two capitals of Macedon, Aigai (near modern Vergina) and Pella. Pella was the birthplace of Philip II of Macedon and Alexander the Great. Stagira in Halkidiki, was the birthplace of Aristotle.

== Economy ==
In 2011, the GDP per capita of Central Macedonia was €14,400, marking a 9th place of the 13 regions of Greece, well below the national average of €18,500.

== Tourism ==
Central Macedonia is Greece's fourth-most-popular tourist region and the most popular destination that is not an island. The Chalkidiki peninsula is Macedonia's most popular beach destination, combining 550 kilometres (340 mi) of sandy beaches with dense forests. There were 116 Blue Flag beaches in Macedonia in 2018, 85 of which were in Chalkidiki. Chalkidiki is also home to Mount Athos, which is an important center of religious tourism. Pieria combines extensive plains, high mountains and sandy beaches and the region's beauty gives it a great potential for further tourist development. It is estimated that 10,000 people climb Mount Olympus each year, most of them reaching only the Skolio summit. Most climbs of Mount Olympus start from the town of Litochoro, which took the name City of Gods because of its location at the foot of the mountain. Central Macedonia is home to the ancient city of Aigai (modern day Vergina), one of Greece's 18 UNESCO World Heritage sites, which was the first capital of ancient Greek kingdom of Macedonia. In 336 BC Philip II was assassinated in Aigai's theatre and his son, Alexander the Great, was proclaimed king. The most important recent finds were made in 1977 when the burial sites of several kings of Macedon were found, including the tomb of Philip II of Macedon. It is also the site of an extensive royal palace. The archaeological museum of Vergina was built to house all the artifacts found at the site and is one of the most important museums in Greece. Pella, which replaced Aigai as the capital of Macedon in the fourth century BC, is also located in Central Macedonia, as well as Dion in Pieria and Amphipolis. These are important destinations for cultural tourism. Thessaloniki is home to numerous notable Byzantine monuments, including the Paleochristian and Byzantine monuments of Thessaloniki, a UNESCO World Heritage Site, as well as several Roman, Ottoman and Sephardic Jewish structures. Apart from being the cultural center of Macedonia, Thessaloniki is also a hub for urban tourism and gastronomy.

== Major cities and towns ==
- Alexandria
- Aridaea
- Edessa
- Giannitsa
- Katerini
- Kilkis
- Koufalia
- Langadas
- Litochoro
- Naoussa
- Nea Kallikratia
- Nea Moudania
- Polygyros
- Polykastro
- Serres
- Skydra
- Thessaloniki metropolitan area
  - Epanomi
  - Evosmos
  - Delta
  - Kalamaria
  - Oraiokastro
  - Panorama
  - Polichni
  - Pylaia
  - Stavroupoli
  - Sykies
  - Thermi
  - Thessaloniki
- Veria

== Archaeological sites ==
- Aegae
- Pella
- Amphipolis
- Dion
- Paleochristian and Byzantine monuments of Thessaloniki
- Stageira
