= Hunk =

Hunk may refer to:

== Arts and entertainment ==
- Hunk (film), a 1987 comedy movie starring John Allen Nelson, Steve Levitt, James Coco, and Avery Schreiber
- The Hunks a reality television series
- Hunk, a movie character, the Scarecrow's Kansas counterpart in the 1939 film The Wizard of Oz
- HUNK (Resident Evil), a character in the Resident Evil video game series
- Hunk (Voltron), a character in the Voltron franchise
- Hunking "Hunk" Marriner, a character in the 1937 novel Northwest Passage, a 1940 film and a 1958-59 TV series

== Other uses ==
- Hunk (nickname)
- Amiga Hunk, a codename for AmigaOS executable files
- Hero Honda Hunk, a 150 cc motorcycle launched by Hero Honda Motors India Ltd
- The changed parts in a diff of files
- Beefcake, a sexually attractive or well-muscled man

== See also ==
- Hunkar (disambiguation)
- Hunker (disambiguation)
- Hunky (disambiguation)
