= Shunk =

Shunk may refer to:

== Places ==
- Shunk, Pennsylvania, an unincorporated community in Sullivan County

== Name ==
Shunk is a surname. Notable people with the surname include:

- Adam Shunk (born 1979), American high jumper
- Francis R. Shunk (1788–1848), Governor of Pennsylvania from 1845 to 1848
- Harry Shunk (1924–2006), German photographer

== See also ==
- Hunk (nickname)
