= Medrese Mosque =

Former mosque in Veria, Central Macedonia, Greece

- Μενδρεσέ Τζαμί
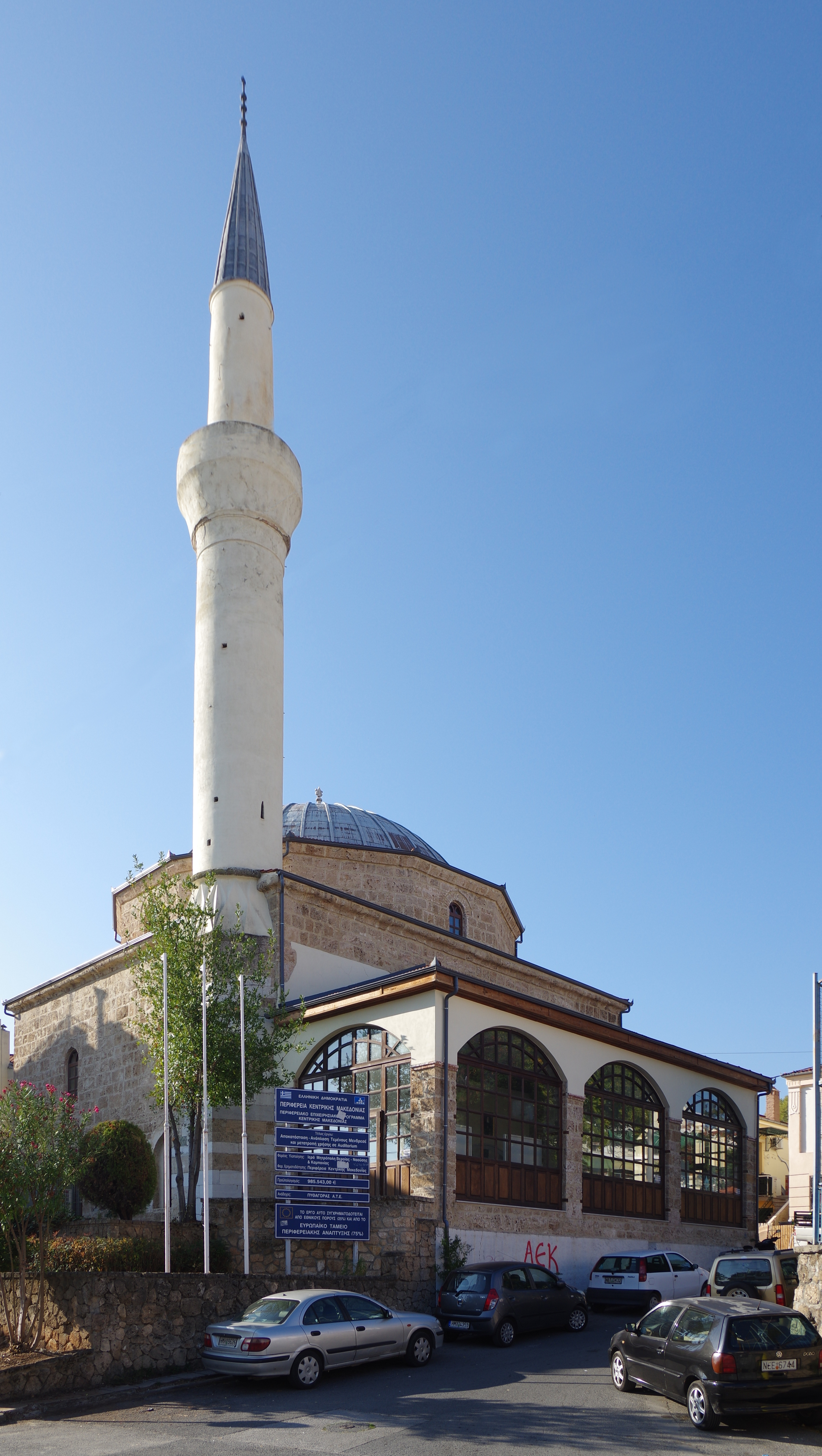
- The former mosque in 2017, a church cultural center since the 1930s

- Location of the former mosque in Greece

Religion
- Affiliation: Islam (former)
- Ecclesiastical or organisational status: Mosque (c. 1850–1920s)
- Ownership: Greek Orthodox Church (since 1936)
- Status: Abandoned (as a mosque); Repurposed (as a church centre)

Location
- Location: Veria, Central Macedonia
- Country: Greece
- Interactive map of Medrese Mosque
- Coordinates: 40°31′07″N 22°12′03″E

Architecture
- Type: Mosque
- Style: Ottoman
- Completed: c. 1850

Specifications
- Dome: 1
- Dome dia. (outer): 11.5 m (38 ft)
- Minaret: 1
- Minaret height: 20 m (66 ft)
- Materials: Stone; bricks

The Medrese Mosque (Greek: Μεντρεσέ Τζαμί), also known as the Tsiai-Aik Mosque, is a former mosque in the city of Veria, in Central Macedonia, in northern Greece. Completed in c. 1850 during the Ottoman era, the former mosque was built on the site of a former Byzantine-era church that in turn was converted into a mosque. The current structure operated as a mosque until the 1920s, when it was abandoned following the Greek-Turkish population exchange.

In 1936, the site was acquired by the Greek Orthodox Church, via the Holy Metropolitan Church of the Holy Apostles Peter and Paul of Veria, and is used as the Pavleion Cultural Center, a community cultural center for the local church.

== History ==
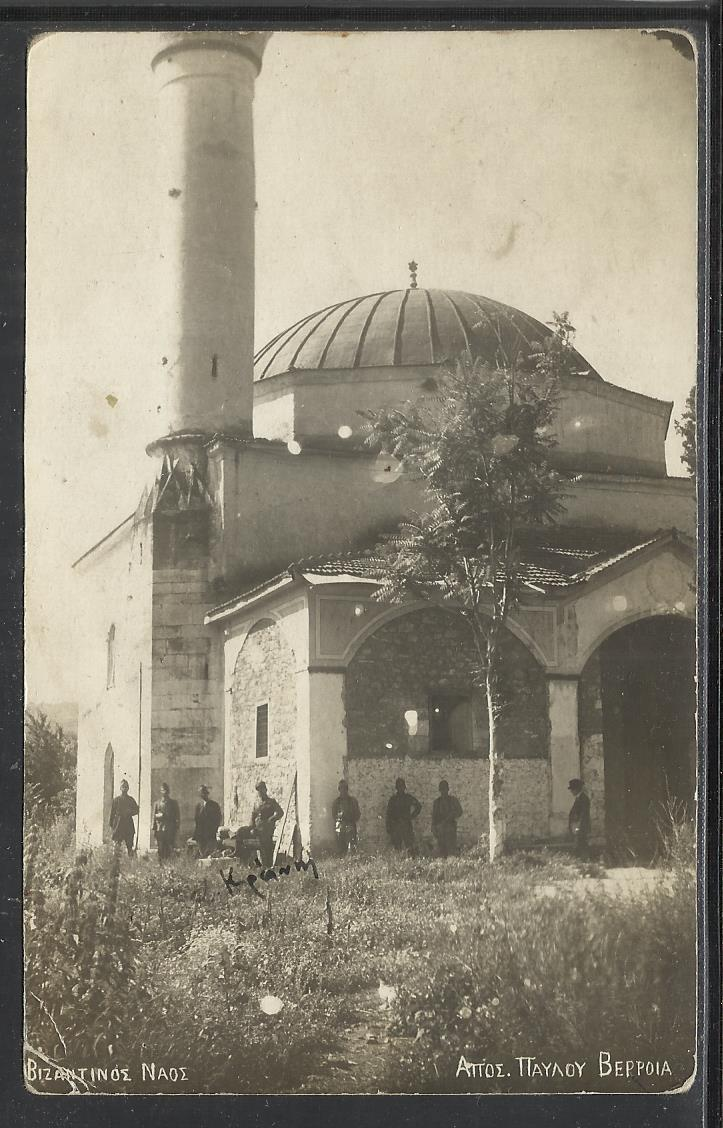
A postcard of the former mosque, in 1932

The former mosque occupies the site of the Byzantine church of St. Paul, on the southern part of the city, outside the city wall. After the Ottomans conquered the city in 1430, they converted the church into the Mosque of Musa Çelebi. The former church-mosque was torn down in c. 1850, for unknown reasons, and its building material reused in the construction of the present mosque structure.

The former mosque derives its name from the nearby medrese (or madrasa), which burned down sometime in the 1920s. During the Ottoman period, it was the largest mosque of the city, and was noted for the particular beauty of the surrounding space.

The 17th-century traveller Evliya Çelebi also reported that a Muslim graveyard existed nearby.

== Architecture ==
The former mosque remains the best-preserved of the city's remaining mosque buildings, despite no longer used for Islamic worship. It is a simple square structure, with a dome of 11.5 metres (38 ft) diameter, supported by a dodecagonal drum. In the interior, however, the drum is not visible, and the dome seems to rest directly on the walls of the main hall. The dome was sheathed in bronze, and its interior was decorated with floral motifs typical of Islamic art and Quranic verses. The mihrab also survives, although damaged, retaining traces of its richly coloured decoration. The building also boasts the only minaret to survive unscathed; on its foundation, a marble fragment taken from the ancient temple to Eunomia is visible.

In 2000, the building was preserved and extensively renovated by the Greek Orthodox Church, with the support of the Ministry of Culture, and renamed as the "Paulio Cultural Center". During the conservation works, architectural elements of the temple of Eunomia and the early Christian temple of the Apostle Paul were revealed, now on display. The space is used as a cultural center.

== See also ==
- Islam in Greece
- List of former mosques in Greece
