= Twin Hamam =

Building in Veroia, Central Macedonia, Greece

Coordinates: 40.520803°N 22.202255°E

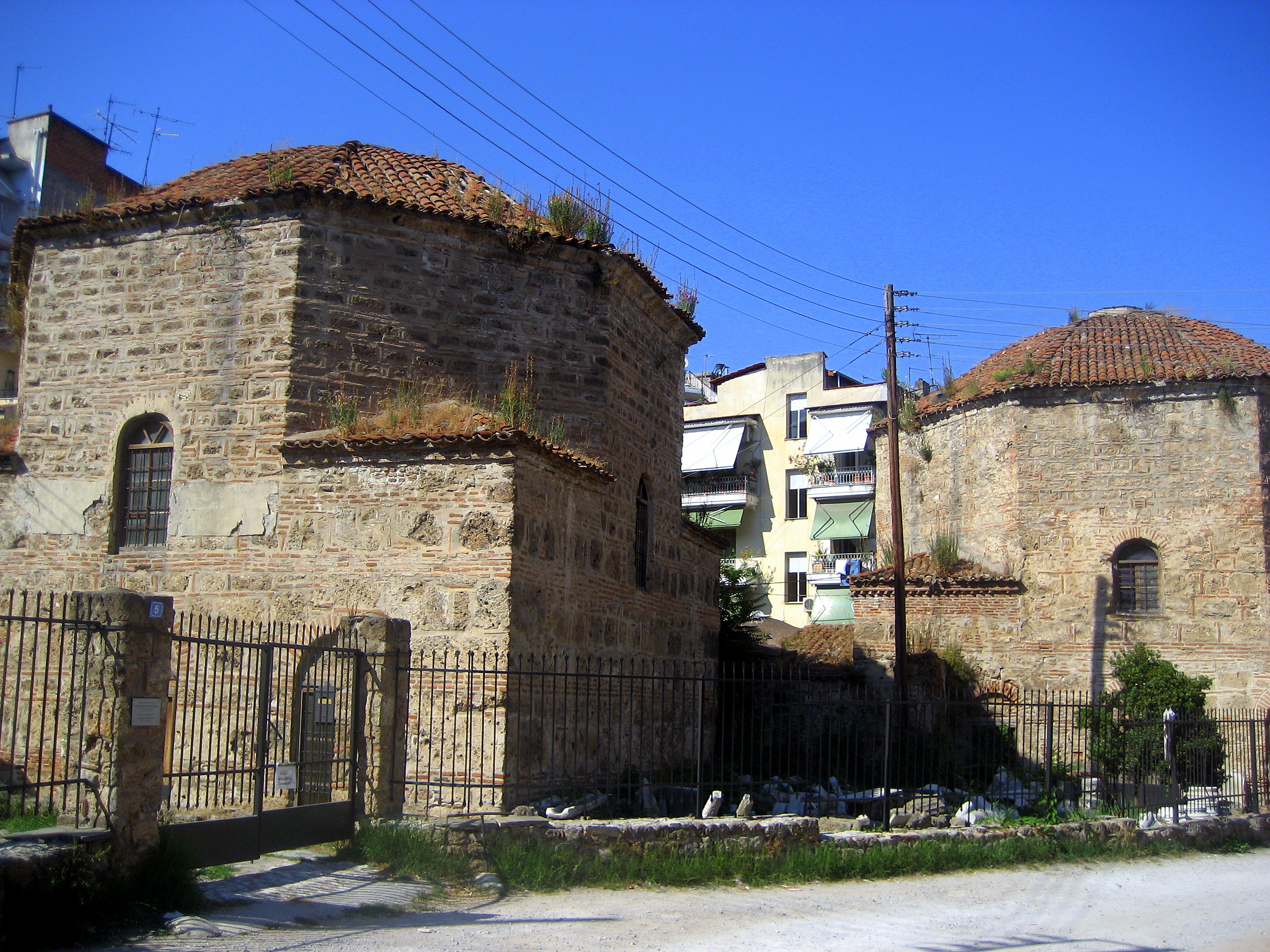
Twin Hamam

The Twin Hamam of Tuzcu Sinan Bey (Greek: Δίδυμα Λουτρά του Σινάν Μπέη Αλατά) are an Ottoman bathhouse (hamam) in the northern Greek city of Veria.

The baths were built by Tuzcu Sinan Bey (Tuzcu means "saltman", whence Greek Αλατάς) at an unknown date, but at any rate before 1640, when it is recorded that repairs were undertaken. They are located in the centre of the city, and continued to function as a bathhouse until 1935. Their name derives from the division into men's and women's sections, which are arranged in an L-shaped fashion. Both sections consist of the same rooms: a large dressing room covered by a round brick-built dome, a warm-water room, and a hot-water room. The bath also features a hypocaust, an unusual feature for Ottoman architecture in Greece. The two bathhouse sections were almost identical, with the men's section being slightly larger and more richly decorated, with mosaics and frescoes with floral patterns.

The bathhouse was declared a protected monument in 1963. The Municipality of Veria took over the building in 1995, which today is used as a fresco conservation laboratory by the 11th Ephorate of Byzantine Antiquities.

== Sources ==
- Marge, Anastasia I.; Matskani, Anna S. (2007). "Η οθωμανική αρχιτεκτονική στην πόλη της Βέροιας" [The Ottoman architecture in the city of Veroia]. Αρχαιολογία και Τέχνες (in Greek) (105): 72–78. ISSN 1108-2402.
