= Hünkar Mosque =

Hünkar Mosque (Turkish: Hünkar Camii, "Sovereign's Mosque") can refer to:

- Hünkar Mosque, Constanța, in Romania
- Hünkar Mosque, Chania, in Greece
- Hünkar Mosque, Veroia, in Greece
- Hünkar Mosque, Sarajevo, in Bosnia
