= Alexandros Papatzikos =

Greek footballer

Personal information
- Full name: Alexandros Papatzikos
- Date of birth: 20 December 1987 (age 38)
- Place of birth: Veria, Greece
- Height: 1.86 m (6 ft 1 in)
- Position: Center back

Team information
- Current team: Veria
- Number: 33

Youth career
- –2005: Veria U20

Senior career*
Years	Team	Apps	(Gls)
2005–2007	Veria	5	(0)
2006–2007	→ Niki Polygyros (loan)	0	(0)
2007–2011	Anagennisi Epanomi	33	(4)
2008–2009	→ Eordaikos (loan)	0	(0)
2011–2012	Niki Volos	24	(0)
2012–2013	Anagennisi Epanomi	30	(0)
2013–2015	Chania	43	(4)
2015–2016	OFI	0	(0)
2016–2017	Panserraikos	38	(1)
2017–2018	Makedonikos	38	(1)
2018–2019	AEEK SYN.KA	0	(0)
2019–2020	Ionikos	12	(0)
2020–2021	Platanias	0	(0)
2021	Santorini	4	(0)
2021–2022	Panelefsiniakos	20	(0)
2022–	Veria	0	(0)
- * Club domestic league appearances and goals as of 24 July 2022

Alexandros Papatzikos (Greek: Αλέξανδρος Παπατζίκος; born 20 December 1987) is a Greek professional footballer who plays as a center back for Super League 2 club Veria.
