= Byzantine Museum of Veroia =

Coordinates: 40.5191°N 22.2034°E

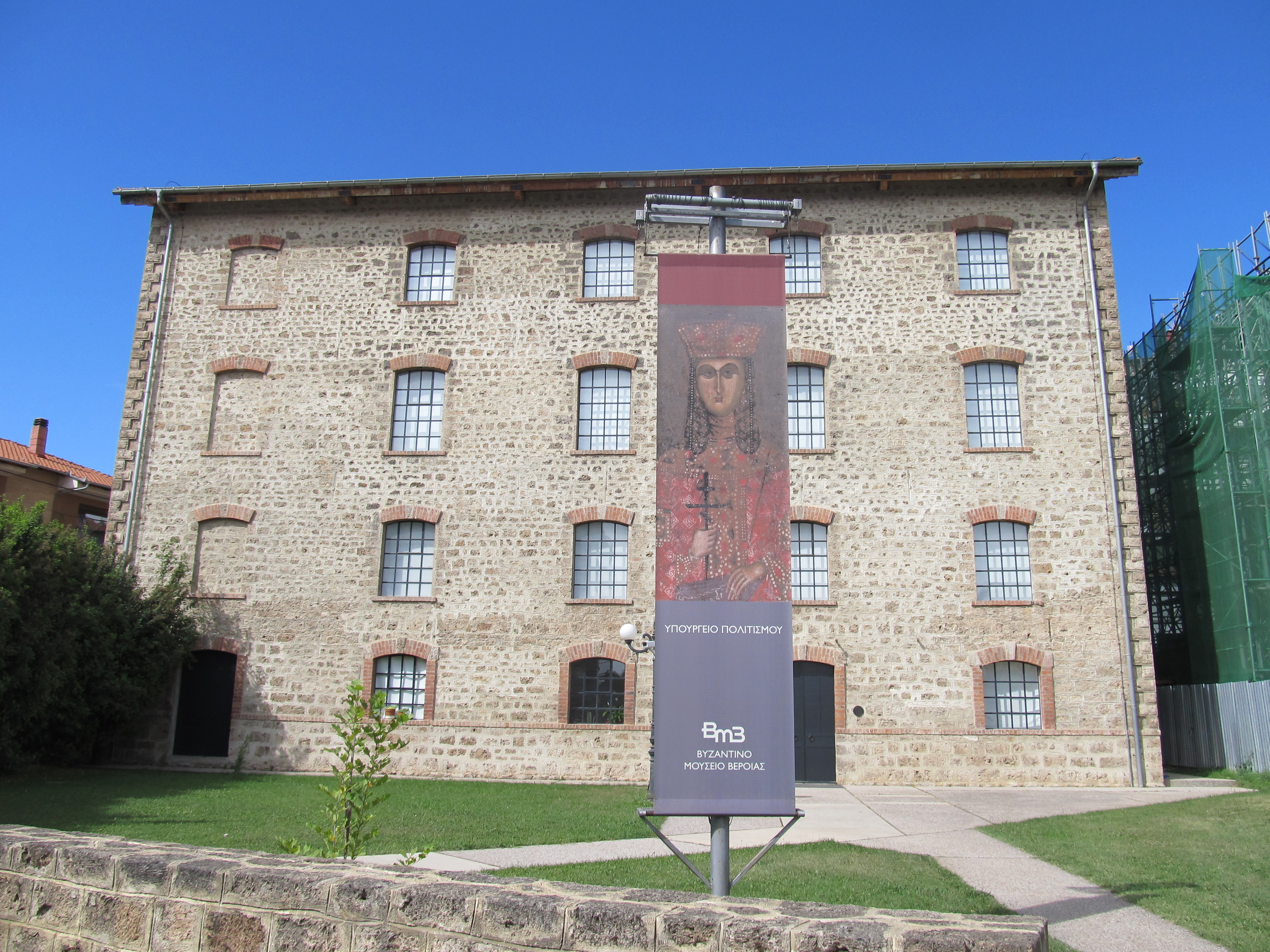

- Location within Greece
- Established: 2002
- Location: Veria, Central Macedonia, Greece
- Type: History Museum
- Key holdings: Veroia, Part of the Byzantine Empire;
- Website: https://en.discoververia.gr/byzantino-mouseio-verias-2/

The Byzantine Museum of Veroia is a museum in Greece that opened in 2002. The museum focuses on artefacts from the Byzantine and Ottoman empires.

== Architecture ==
The museum is housed in the old Markos mill; a rectangular, stone, four-story industrial building with an area of 720 sq.m. that was built between 1908 and 1911 and served as a flour mill until the 1960s. A fire in 1981 burned down much of the building, but due to its historical value it was decided to restore it and turn it into a museum. It was inaugurated in 2002. The building is located in the neighbourhood of the preserved district of Kyriotissa.

== Exhibitions ==
The museum contains a collection of Byzantine, Post-Byzantine and Ottoman objects originating mainly from the Veria city area. Among them are mosaics, ceramic vessels, miniatures, burial finds, frescoes, icons, architectural sculptures, manuscripts, wood carvings, marble inscriptions, pottery, coins, tombstones and architectural elements.

The permanent exhibition is organised into several sections:

1. The exhibition entitled "Veroia, Part of the Byzantine Empire" is on display on the first floor of the building. It is a collection of portable icons (many of which are double-sided), wall-paintings, mosaic floors (from the courtyard of the church of Agios Patapios in Veroia), manuscripts and early printed works, pottery (ceramic items for everyday use and glazed pottery), Byzantine coins, and wood-carvings.
2. On the first floor, the exhibition focuses on the elements of Byzantine culture related to Veria, a city on the outskirts of the empire but which had a notable wealth of monuments. Among other aspects, the religious, artistic and commercial relations between Veria and the main centres of Byzantine culture, such as Constantinople, Thessaloniki and Kastoria, are exposed. Another subsection is devoted to post-Byzantine painting and another to the activity of artists.
3. The second floor is dedicated to the life of the city and private life through its monuments. The evolution of the city, its urban planning, the administrative and ecclesiastical organization, the daily activities of its inhabitants, and funerary uses are exposed.
4. The third floor is dedicated to religious worship and includes aspects such as the structure of worship buildings, decorative and symbolic elements, and man's communication with the divine.

== Sources ==
- This article incorporates text from the corresponding article at the Museums of Macedonia website, commissioned by the Macedonian Heritage foundation, written by Vlasis Vlasidis, and published under a CC-BY-SA-3.0 license.
