= Veria =

City in Macedonia, Greece

Veria Βέροια
- Municipality
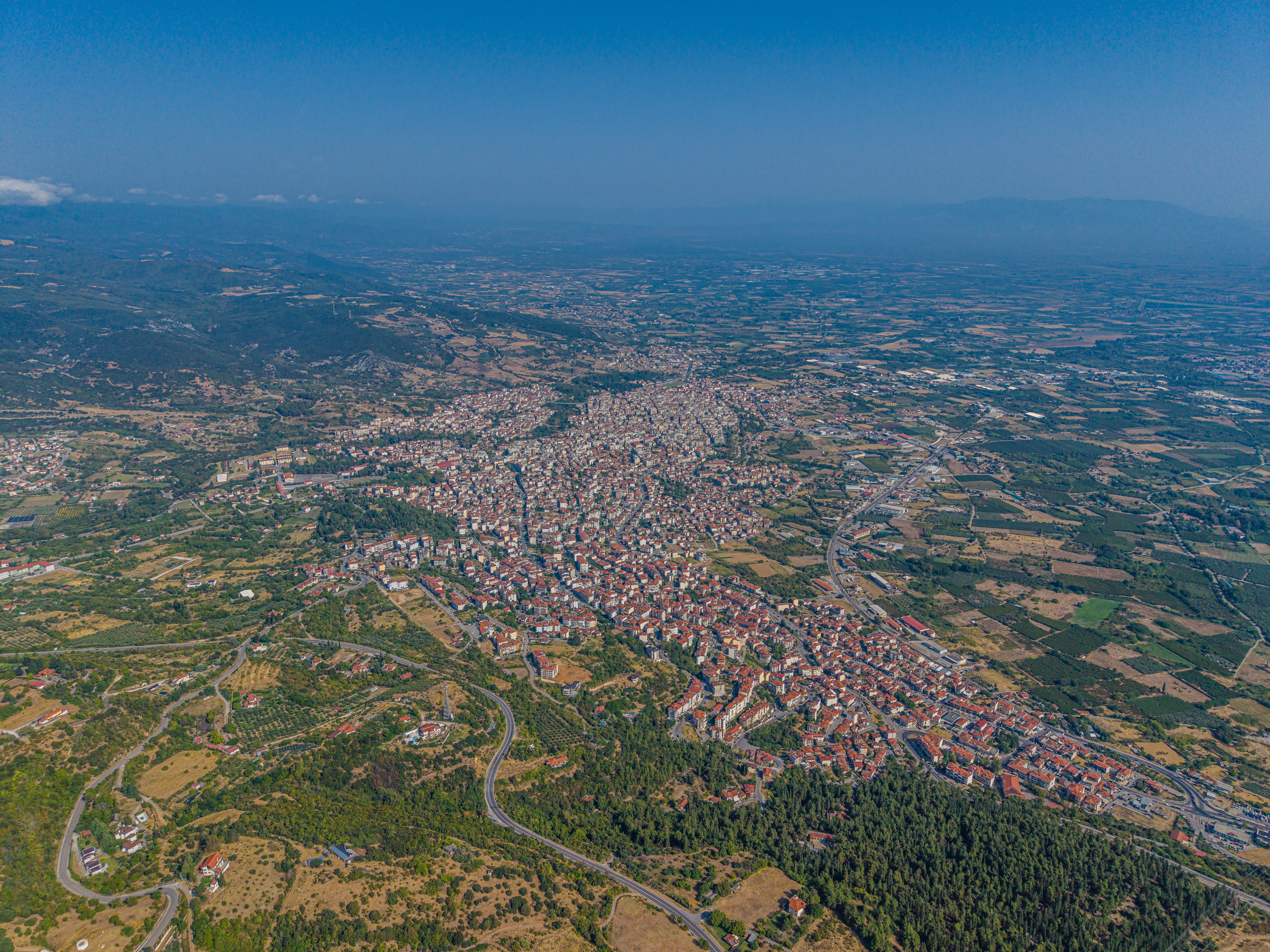
- Panoramic view

- Seal

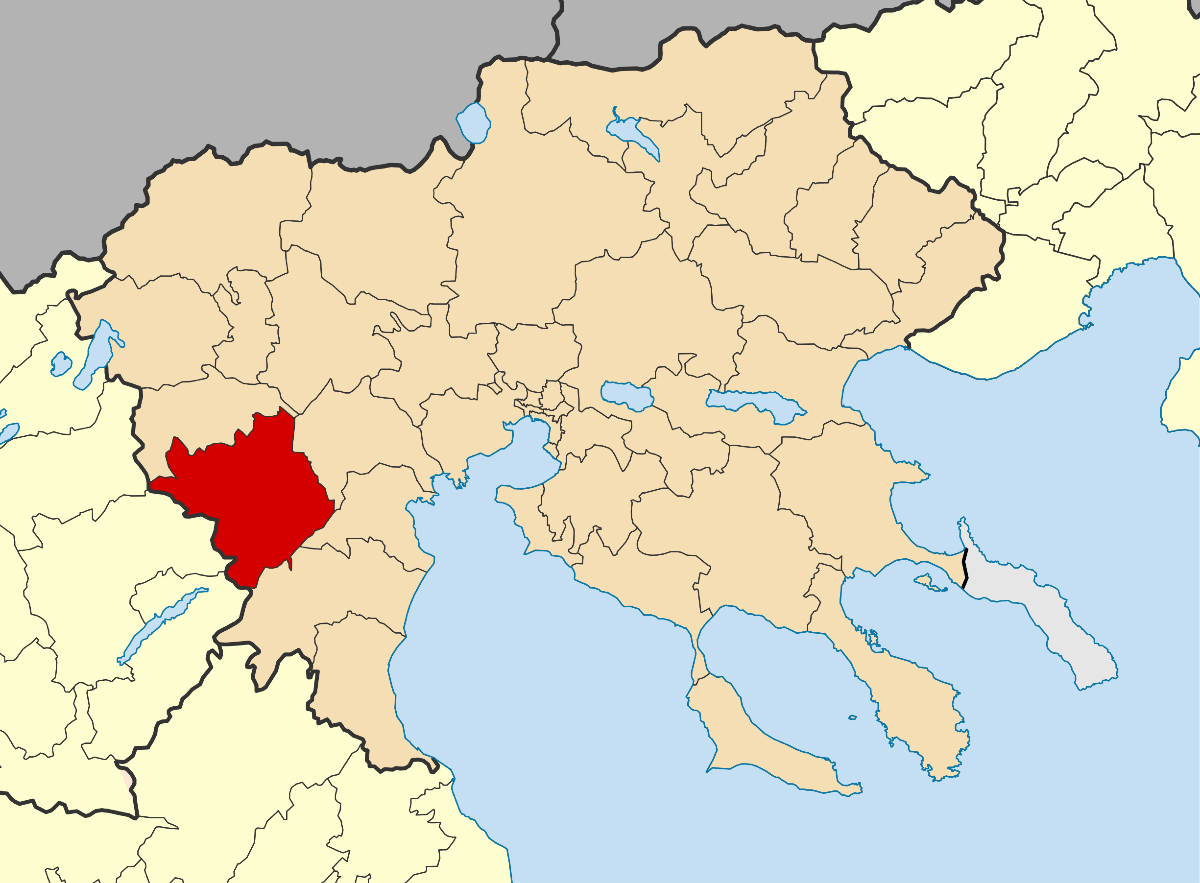

- Location within Greece
- Coordinates: 40°31′N 22°12′E
- Country: Greece
- Administrative region: Central Macedonia
- Regional unit: Imathia

Government
  - Mayor: Konstantinos Vorgiazidis (since 2014)

Area
  - Municipality: 796.5 km^{2} (307.5 sq mi)
  - Municipal unit: 359.1 km^{2} (138.6 sq mi)
- Elevation: 128 m (420 ft)

Population (2021)
  - Municipality: 62,655
  - Density: 78.66/km^{2} (203.7/sq mi)
  - Municipal unit: 46,976
  - Municipal unit density: 130.8/km^{2} (338.8/sq mi)
- Time zone: UTC+2 (EET)
  - Summer (DST): UTC+3 (EEST)
- Postal code: 591 31, 591 32
- Area code: 2331
- Vehicle registration: ΗΜ
- Website: www.veria.gr

UNESCO World Heritage Site
- Official name: Archaeological Site of Aigai (modern name Vergina)
- Includes: 1. Ancient City and Necropolis of Aegae; 2. Bronze Age settlement and Cemetery of Tumuli
- Criteria: Cultural: (i)(iii)
- Reference: 780
- Inscription: 1996 (20th Session)
- Area: 1,420.81 ha (3,510.9 acres)
- Buffer zone: 4,811.73 ha (11,890.0 acres)

Veria (Greek: Βέροια or Βέρροια, romanized: Véroia or Vérroia; Aromanian: Veria), officially transliterated Veroia, historically also spelled Beroea or Berea, is a city in Central Macedonia, in the geographic region of Macedonia, northern Greece, and the capital of the regional unit of Imathia. It is located 511 kilometres (318 miles) north-northwest of the capital Athens and 73 km (45 mi) west-southwest of Thessaloniki.

Even by the standards of Greece, Veria is an old city; first mentioned in the writings of Thucydides in 432 BC, there is evidence that it was populated as early as 1000 BC. Veria was an important possession for Philip II of Macedon (father of Alexander the Great) and later for the Romans. Apostle Paul famously preached in the city, and its inhabitants were among the first Christians in the Empire. Later, under the Byzantine and Ottoman empires, Veria was a center of Greek culture and learning. Today Veria is a commercial center of Central Macedonia, the capital of the regional unit of Imathia and the seat of a Church of Greece Metropolitan bishop in the Ecumenical Patriarchate, as well as a Latin Catholic titular see.

The extensive archaeological site of Vergina (ancient Aegae, the first capital of Macedon), a UNESCO World Heritage Site containing the tomb of Philip II of Macedon, lies 12 km (7.5 mi) south-east of the city center of Veria.

== History ==
=== Classical and Roman Veria ===
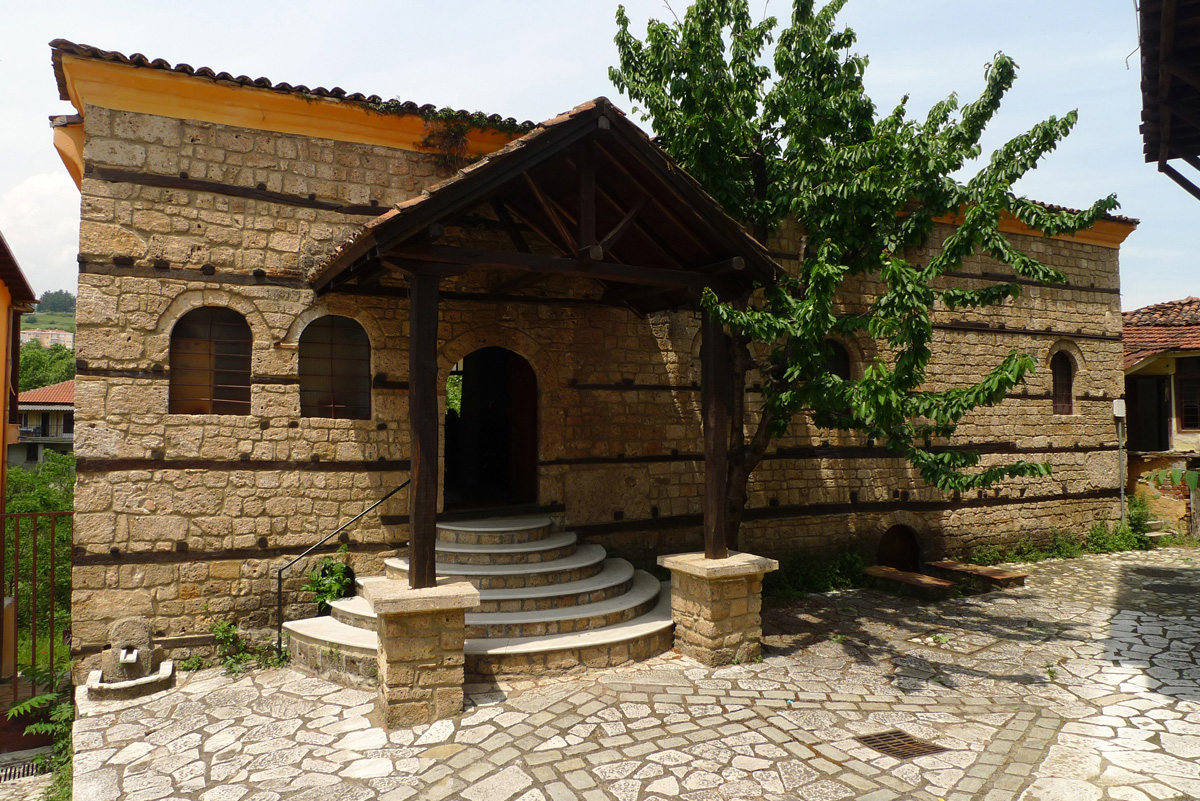
The Jewish synagogue. Veria had a significant Jewish community until its deportation in World War II

The city is reputed to have been named by its mythical creator Beres (also spelled Pheres) or from the daughter of the king of Berroia who was thought to be the son of Macedon. Veria enjoyed great prosperity under the kings of the Argead Dynasty (whose most famous member was Alexander the Great) as an important city near the capital Aigai and then Pella; the city reached the height of its glory and influence in the Hellenistic period, during the reign of the Antigonid Dynasty. During this time, Veria became the seat of the Koinon of Macedonians (Κοινόν Μακεδόνων), minted its own coinage and held sports games named Alexandreia, in honor of Alexander the Great, with athletes from all over Greece competing in them.

Veria surrendered to Rome in 168 BC. During the Roman Empire, Veria became a place of worship for the Romans. Diocletian made the large and populous city one of two capitals of the Roman province of Macedonia, eponymous in the civil Diocese of Macedonia. Within the city there was a Jewish settlement where the Apostle Paul, after leaving Thessalonica, and his companion Silas preached to the Jewish and Greek communities of the city in AD 50/51 or 54/55. The Bible records:

As soon as it was night, the brothers sent Paul and Silas away to Berea. On arriving there, they went to the Jewish synagogue. Now the Bereans were of more noble character than the Thessalonians, for they received the message with great eagerness and examined the Scriptures every day to see if what Paul said was true. Many of the Jews believed, as did also a number of prominent Greek women and many Greek men. When the Jews in Thessalonica learned that Paul was preaching the word of God at Berea, they went there too, agitating the crowds and stirring them up. The brothers immediately sent Paul to the coast, but Silas and Timothy stayed at Berea. The men who escorted Paul brought him to Athens and then left with instructions for Silas and Timothy to join him as soon as possible.

— Acts 17:10–15

==== Recent Discoveries ====
In December 2021, archaeologists announced the discovery of an unfinished Roman-era statue of a young athletic man at Agios Patapios. The headless marble statue is about three feet tall. According to the Greece's Culture Ministry, the sculpture has similarities to statues of the Greek gods Apollo and Hermes.

=== Byzantine Veria ===
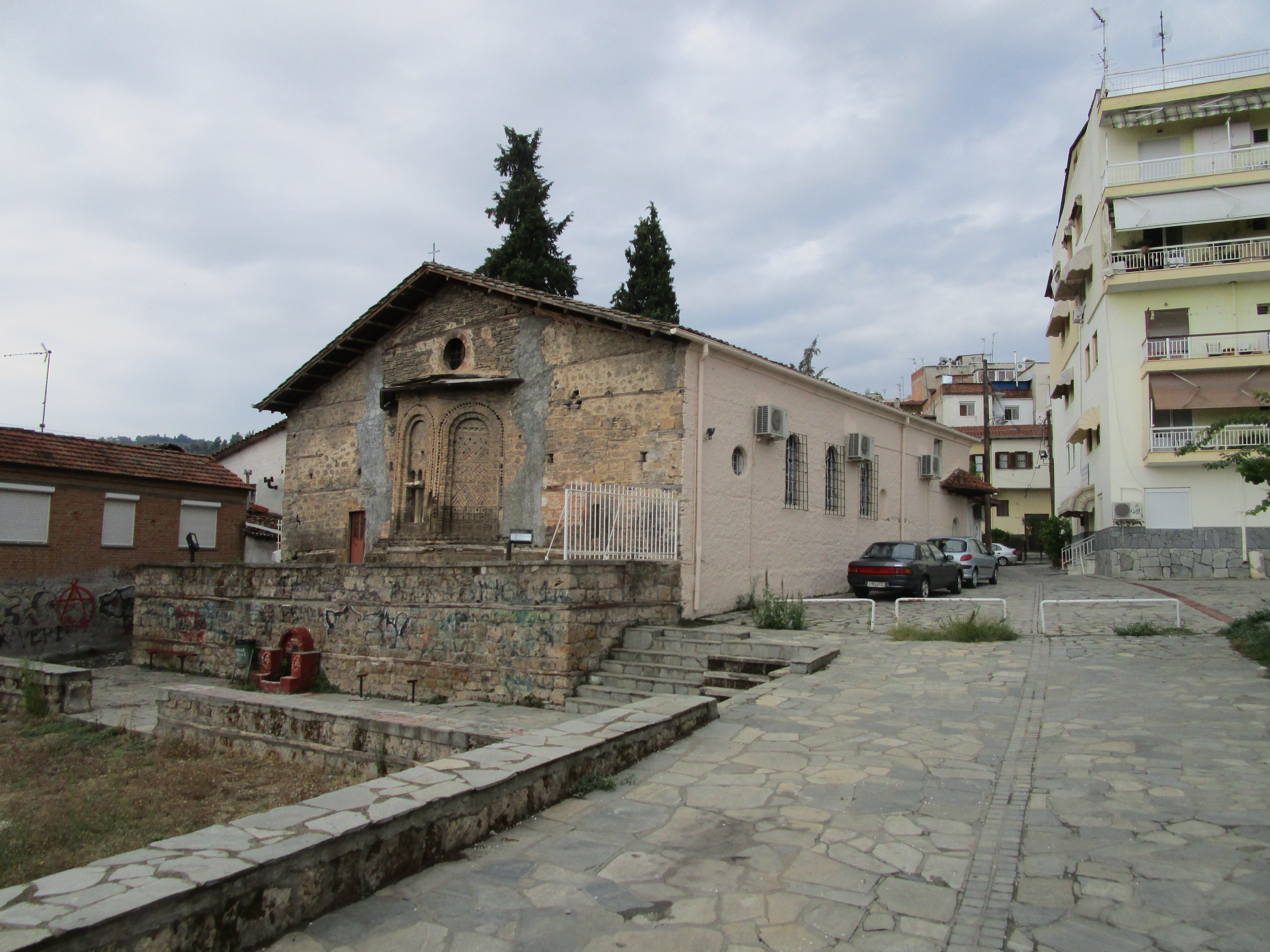
St Sabbas (14th century)

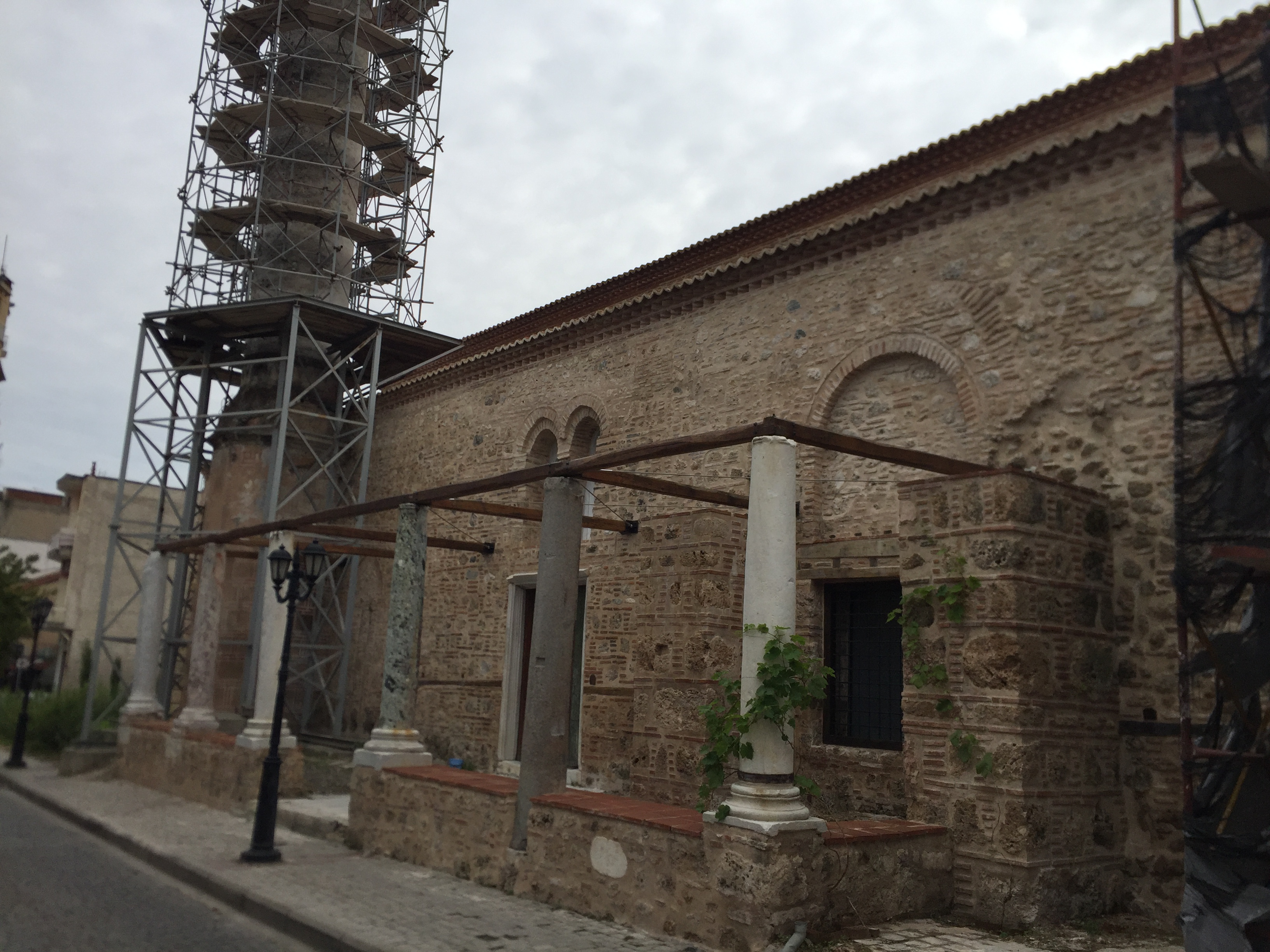
View of Saint Paul, the Old Metropolitan Cathedral of Veria

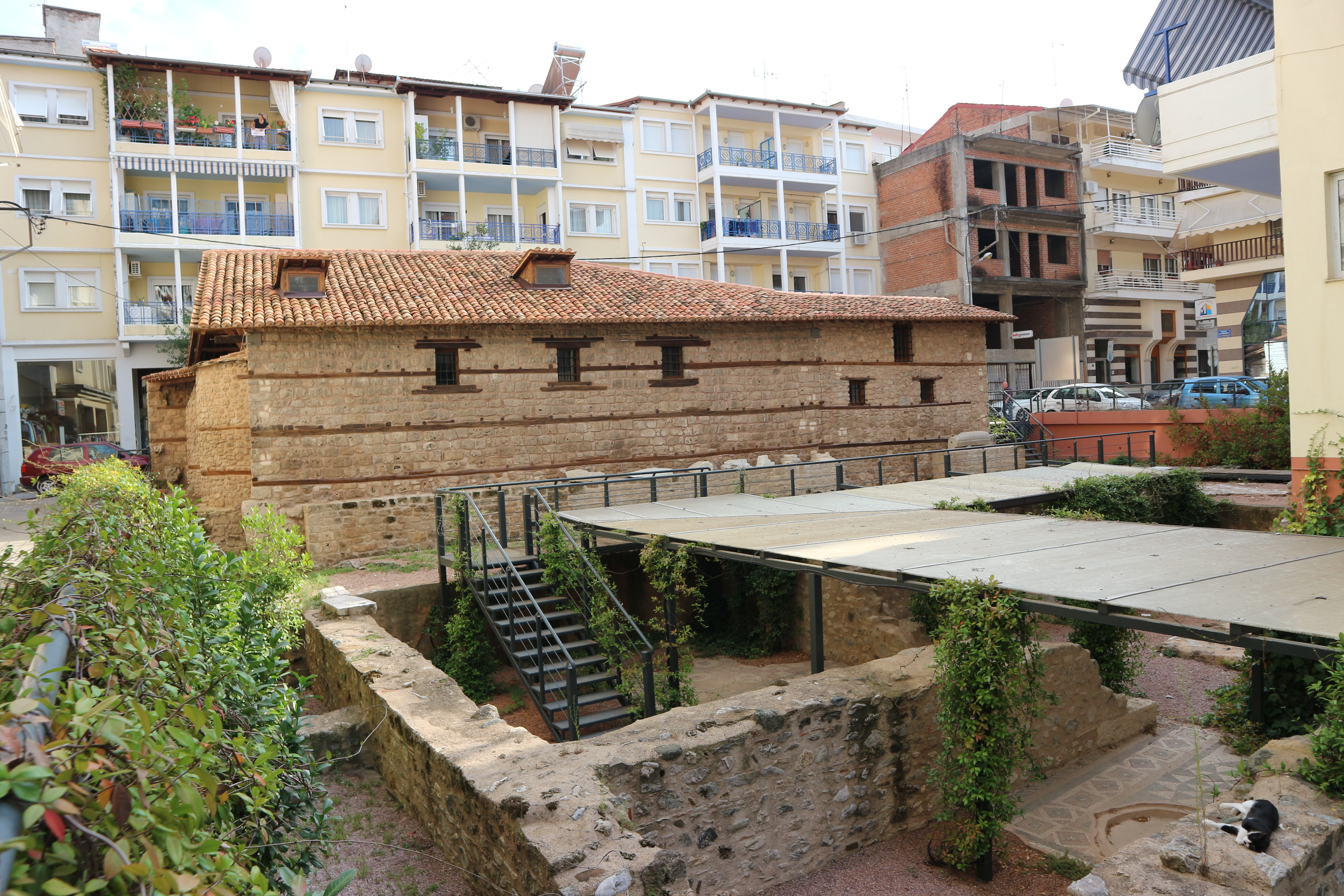
Saint Patapius (15th)

Under the Byzantine Empire Berrhoea continued to grow and prosper, developing a large and well-educated commercial class (Greek and Jewish) and becoming a center of medieval Greek learning; signs of this prosperity are reflected in the many Byzantine churches that were built at this time, during which it was a Christian bishopric (see below).

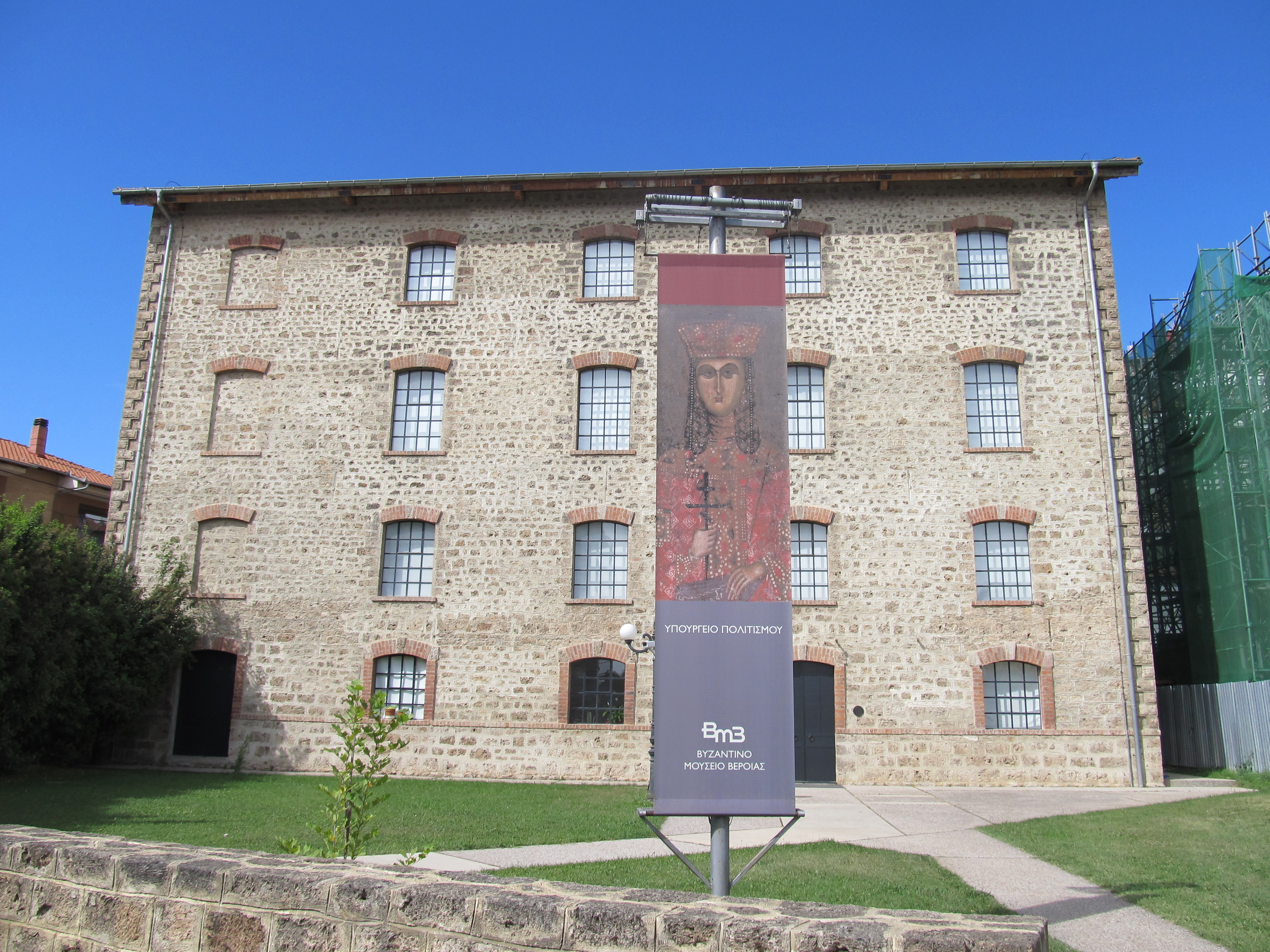
Byzantine Museum of Veroia

In the 7th century, the Slavic tribe of the Drougoubitai raided the lowlands below the city, while in the late 8th century Empress Irene of Athens is said to have rebuilt and expanded the city and named it Irenopolis (Ειρηνούπολις) after herself, although some sources place this Berrhoea-Irenopolis further east, towards Thrace.

The city was apparently held by the Bulgarian Empire at some point in the late 9th century. The 11th-century Greek bishop Theophylact of Ohrid wrote that during the brief period of Bulgarian dominance, Tsar Boris I built there one of the seven cathedral churches built by him and refers to it as "one of the beautiful Bulgarian churches". In the Escorial Taktikon of c. 975, the city is mentioned as the seat of a strategos, and it apparently was the capital of a theme in the 11th century. The city briefly fell to Tsar Samuel of Bulgaria at the end of the 10th century, but the Byzantine emperor Basil II quickly regained it in 1001 since its Bulgarian governor, Dobromir, surrendered the city without a fight. The city is not mentioned again until the late 12th century, when it was briefly held by the Normans (1185) during their invasion of the Byzantine Empire.

After the Fourth Crusade (1204), it briefly became part of Boniface of Montferrat's Kingdom of Thessalonica, and a Latin bishop took up residence in the city. In c. 1206, the city was taken by the Bulgarian ruler, Kalojan. Many inhabitants were killed while others, including the Latin bishop, fled. Kalojan installed Bulgarians as commandant and bishop, and resettled some of the leading families to Bulgaria. After Kalojan's death in 1207, the city may have reverted to Latin rule, but there is no evidence of this; at any rate, by 1220 it had been occupied by the ruler of Epirus, Theodore Komnenos Doukas, for in that year the doux Constantine Pegonites is attested as governing the city in his name. It changed hands again in 1246, being taken by the Emperor of Nicaea John III Doukas Vatatzes, and formed part of the restored Byzantine Empire after 1261.

The 14th century was tumultuous: the area was pillaged by Karasid Turks in 1331, and captured by the Serbian ruler Stephen Dushan in 1343/4, when it became part of his Serbian Empire. It was recovered for Byzantium by John VI Kantakouzenos in 1350, but lost again to the Serbians soon after, becoming the domain of Radoslav Hlapen after 1358. With the disintegration of the Serbian Empire, it passed once more to Byzantium by ca. 1375, but was henceforth menaced by the rising power of the Ottoman Turks.

According to a tradition preserved by Yazıcıoğlu Ali, the two younger sons of the Seljuk sultan Kaykaus II were settled by Emperor Michael VIII Palaiologos in Veria, and made its governors. One of their descendants converted to Christianity, and one of his progeny, a certain Lyzikos, in turn surrendered the city to the Ottoman Sultan (perhaps Bayezid I). After the Ottoman conquest he and his relatives were settled at Zichna. This story explains the presence of Gagauz people in Veria and its environs. The Ottoman chroniclers report that the town was first captured in 1385, while the Byzantine short chronicles record the date as 8 May 1387. The city changed hands several times over the next decades, until the final Turkish conquest around 1430.

=== Ottoman Veria ===
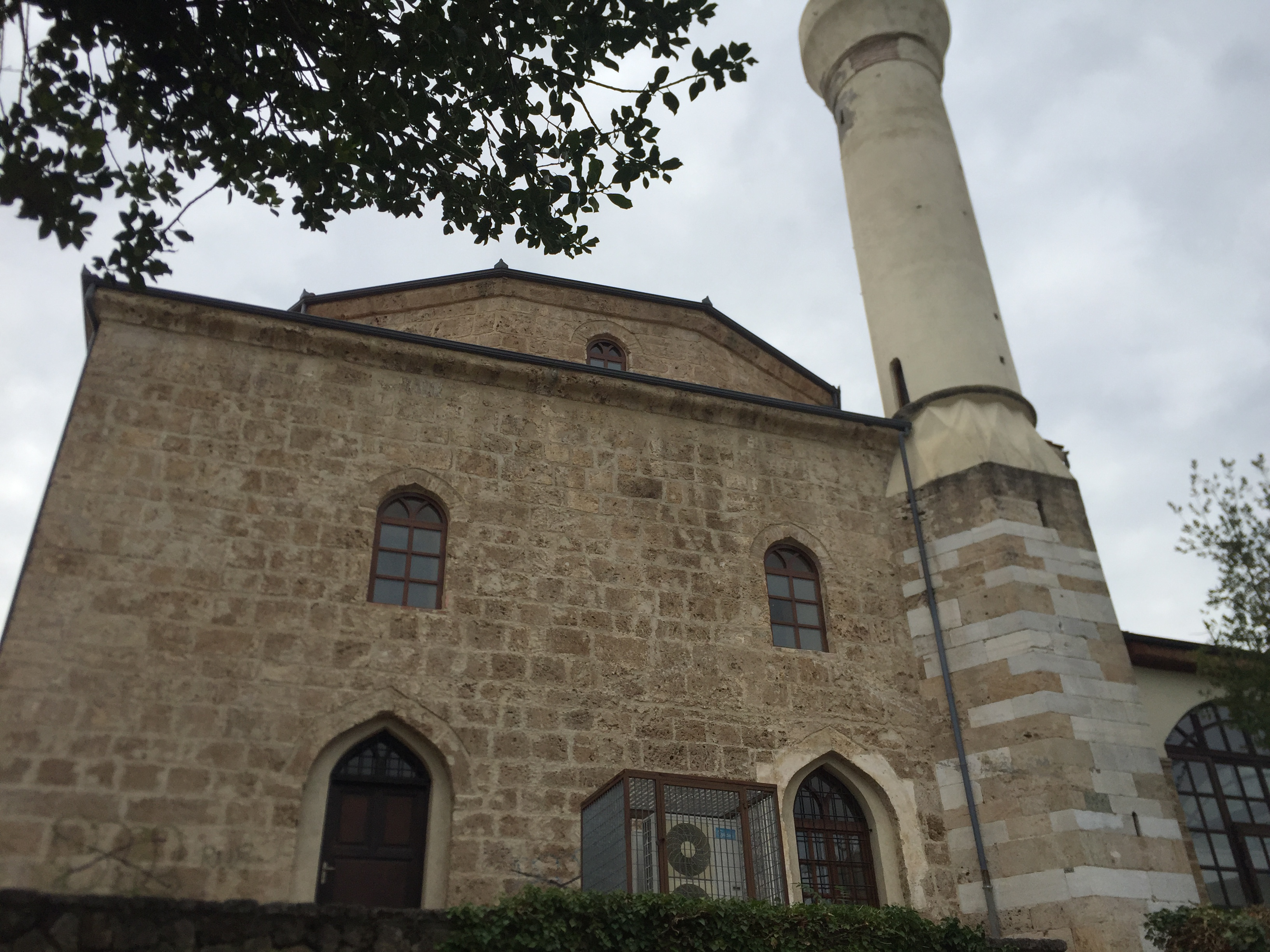
Medrese Mosque

The Ottomans called Veria Karaferye ("black Veria"), because of its characteristic morning mist during the humid winter seasons. In 1519 (Hijri 925) the town had 231 Muslim and 578 Christian households. Under Ottoman rule, Veria was the seat of a kaza within the Sanjak of Salonica; by 1885, the kaza, along with Naoussa, included 46 villages and chiftliks. The 17th-century traveller Evliya Çelebi reports that the city was peaceful, without walls or garrison; it had 4000 houses, 16 Muslim quarters, 15 Christian quarters, and 2 Jewish congregations. The city was a prosperous center of rice production.

According to the 1881/82-1893 Ottoman General Census, the kaza of Veria (Karaferiye) had a total population of 25,034, consisting of 15,103 Greeks, 7,325 Muslims, 2,174 Bulgarians, 393 Jews, and 39 foreign citizens. Veria was an important regional center of Greek commerce and learning, and counted many important Greek scholars as its natives (e.g. Ioannis Kottounios)

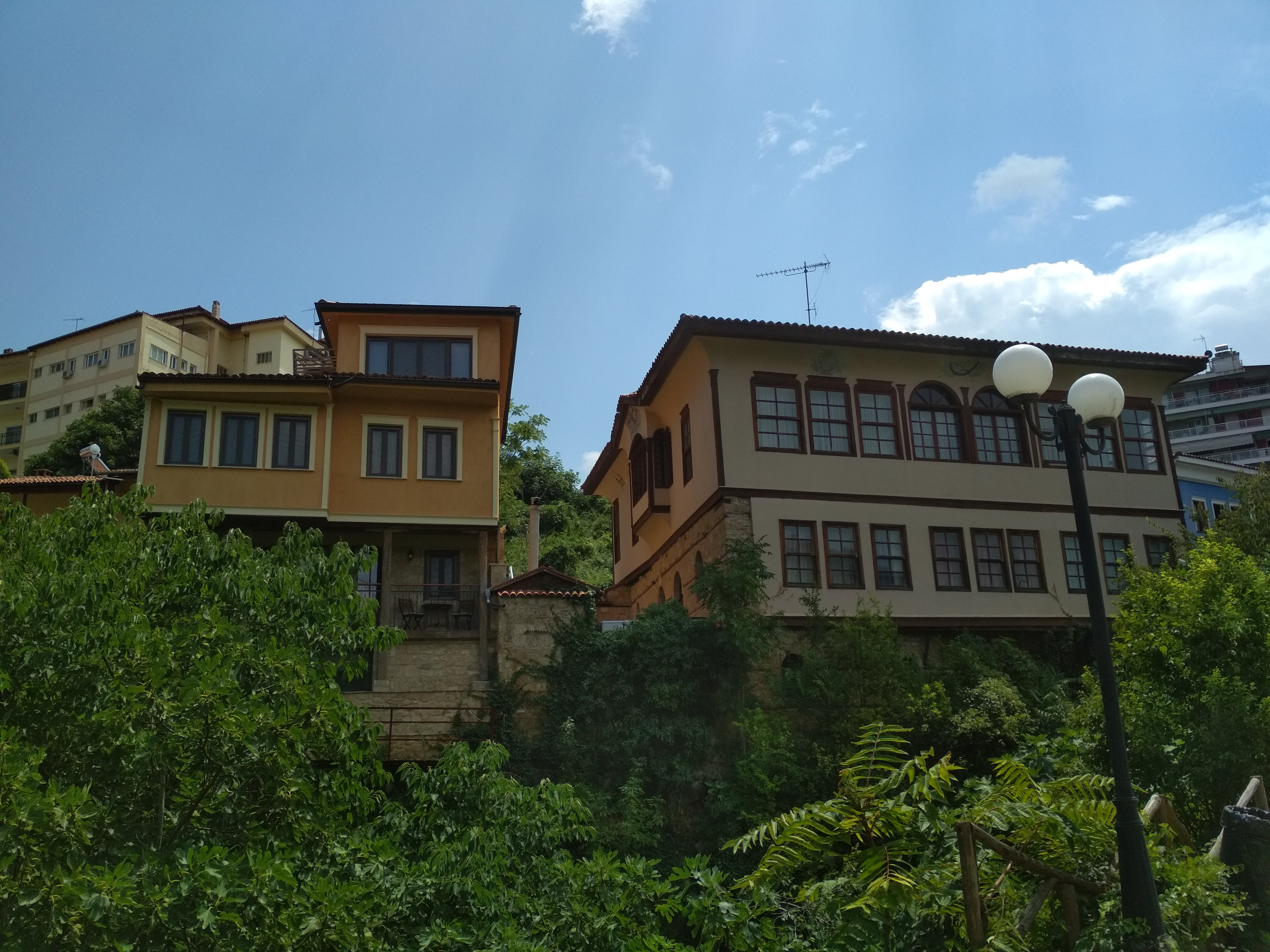
Barbuta district

=== Modern Veria ===
The presence of a large, prosperous and educated bourgeoisie made Veria one of the centers of Greek nationalism in the region of Macedonia, and the city's inhabitants had an active part in the Greek War of Independence; important military leaders during the uprising included Athanasios Syropoulos, Georgios Syropoulos, Dimitrios Kolemis and Georgios Kolemis, among others; however, as was the case with the rest of Northern Greece, eventually the uprising was defeated, and Veria only became part of modern Greece in 1912 during the Balkan Wars, when it was taken by the Hellenic Army on October 16, 1912 (October 16 is an official holiday in Veria, commemorating the city's incorporation to Greece), and was officially annexed to Greece following the signing of the Treaty of Athens in November 1913.

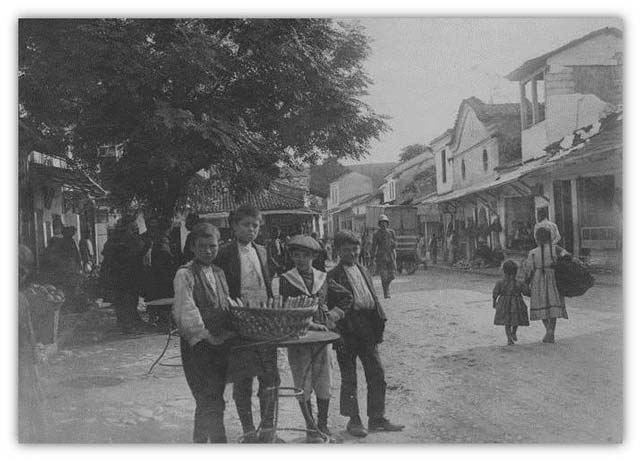
Agios Antonios Square, 1917

==== World War II ====
During World War II, Veria was under Nazi occupation between 1941 and 1944. An important resistance movement developed in the city, with the left-wing EAM gaining the sympathy of the inhabitants; the people of Veria took part in resistance activities, such as sabotaging the railway, assassinating SS members, and burning Nazi war material. The town asked Prokopis Kambitoglou to become the Mayor of Veria during the occupation. His role in attempting to mitigate the oppression of the Germans was rewarded after the war by the award of the Order of the Phoenix in recognition of his efforts.

During the Occupation almost all of the Jewish community of the city was deported and exterminated by the Nazis.

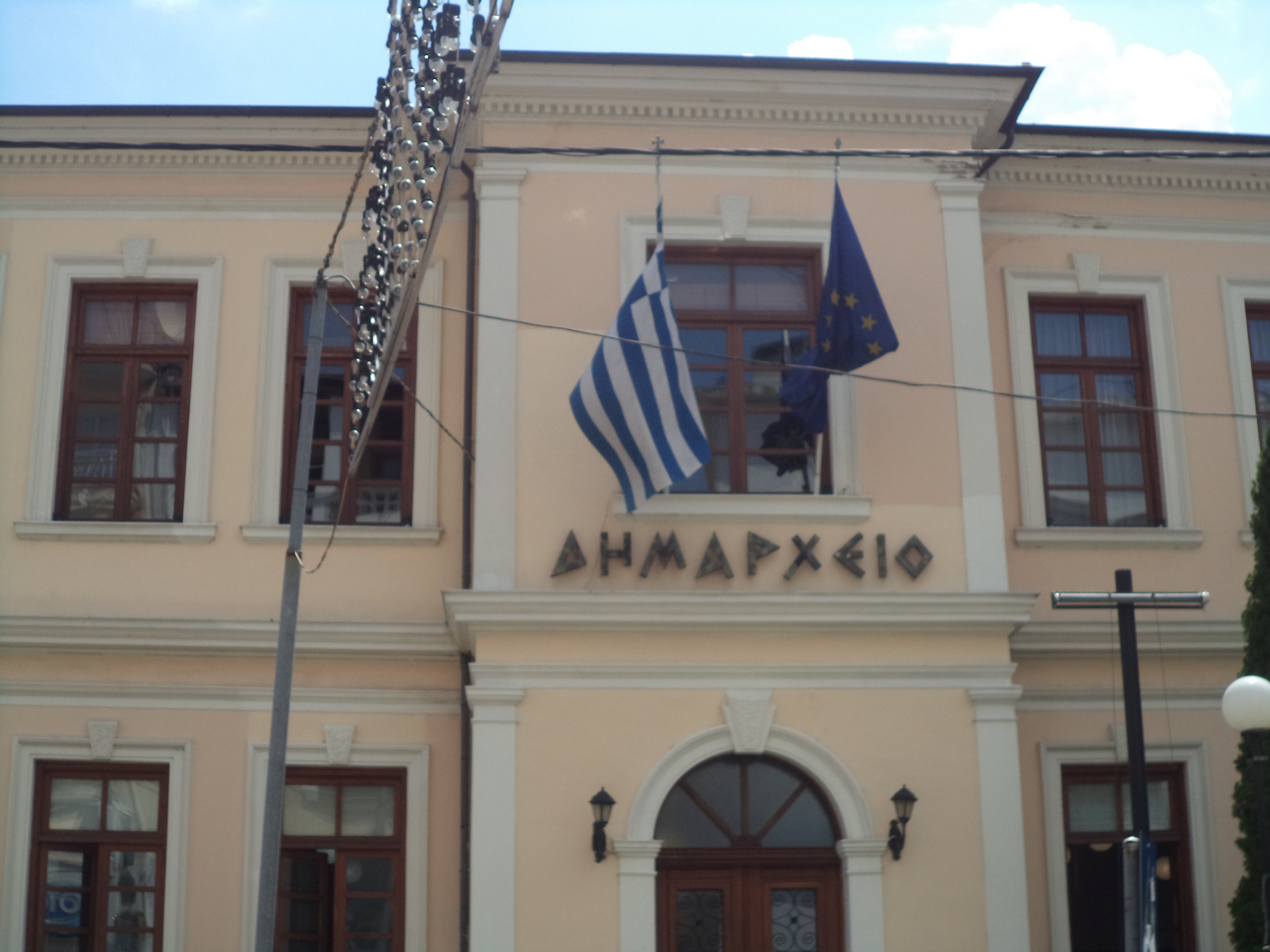
The town hall

==== Postwar ====
Postwar Veria saw a significant rise in population, and a greatly improved standard of living. The 1980s and 1990s in particular were a period of prosperity, with the agricultural businesses and cooperatives in the fertile plains around Veria successfully exporting their products in Europe, the US and Asia. The discovery of the tomb of Philip II of Macedon in the nearby archaeological site of Vergina (ancient Aegae, the summer capital of the Argead Dynasty of Macedon, now a UNESCO World Heritage Site), also made Veria a tourist destination.

Veria has a significant immigrant population, mainly from countries of Central and Eastern Europe.

== Ecclesiastical history ==
Berrhoea was a suffragan diocese of the Archbishopric of Thessalonica, in the sway of the Patriarchate of Constantinople.

The names of five of its bishops appear in extant contemporary documents:

- Gerontius took part in the Council of Sardica (c. 344),
- Lucas in the Robber Council of Ephesus (449),
- Sebastian in the Council of Chalcedon (451),
- Timothy in the synod convoked by Patriarch Menas of Constantinople in 536, and
- Joseph in the Council of Constantinople (869) that condemned Photius.

The Byzantine emperor Michael VIII Palaiologos promoted the local see to an archbishopric after 1261, and it advanced further to the rank of a metropolitan see by 1300.

=== Latin titular see ===
The diocese of Berrhoea was nominally restored in 1933 by the Catholic Church as the titular bishopric of Berrhœa (Latin) / Berrea (Curiate Italian).

It has been vacant for decades, having the following incumbents:

- Cardinal Alfredo Ottaviani (Italian) (1962.04.05 – 1962.04.20)
- Pierre-Auguste–Marie–Joseph Douillard (1963.05.22 – 1963.08.20) as emeritate
- Federico Kaiser Depel, M.S.C. (1963.10.29 – death 1993.09.26)

== Local government — municipality ==
The municipality Veria was formed at the 2011 local government reform by the merger of the following 5 former municipalities, that became municipal units:

- Apostolos Pavlos
- Dovras
- Makedonida
- Vergina
- Veria

The municipality has an area of 796.494 km^{2}, the municipal unit 359.146 km^{2}.

== Geography ==
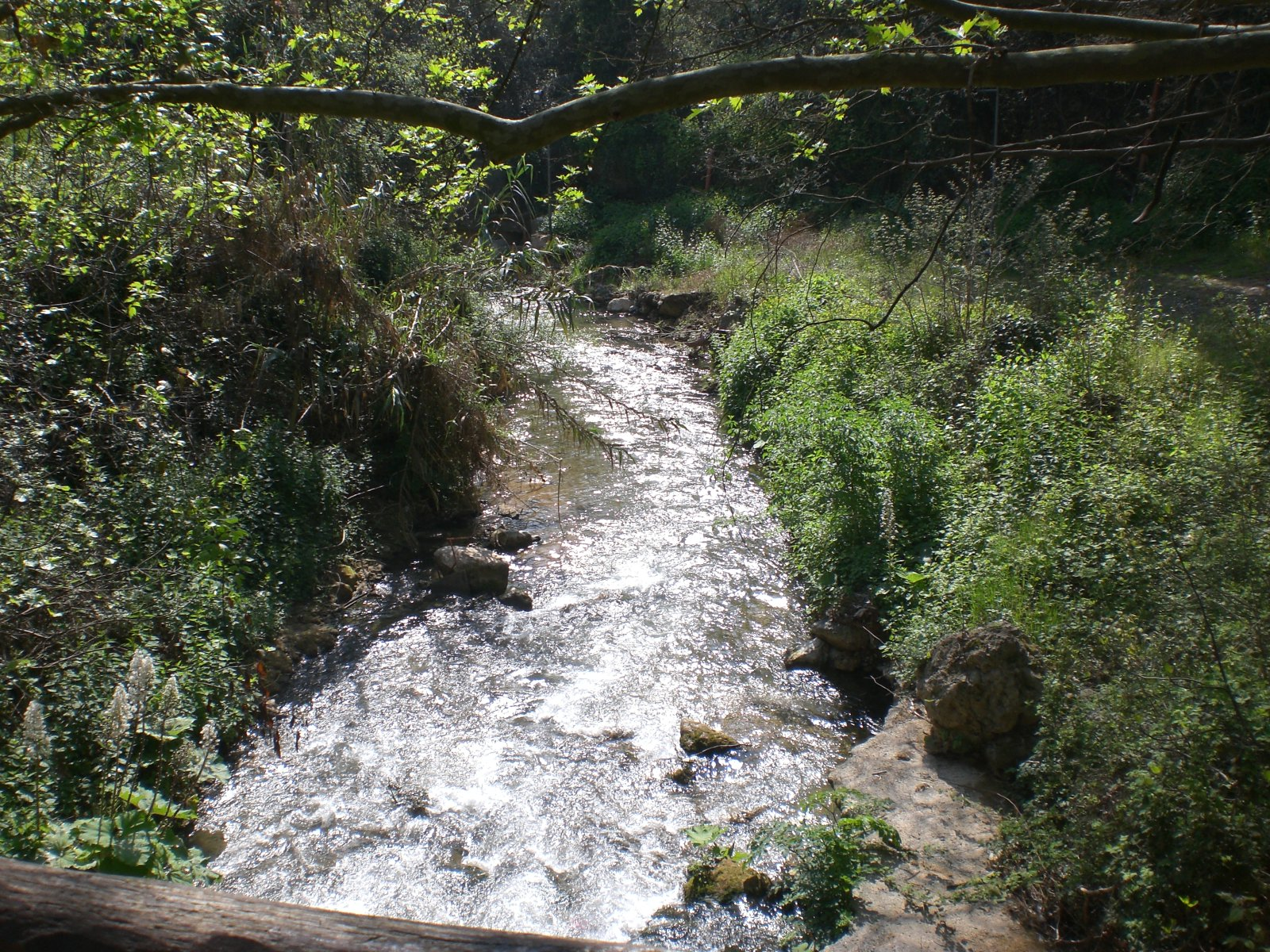
Barbuta river across the city

=== Geology ===
Veria is located at 40º31' North, 22º12' East, at the eastern foot of the Vermio Mountains. It lies on a plateau at the western edge of the Central Macedonia plain, north of the Haliacmon River. The town straddles the Tripotamos (river), a Haliacmon tributary that provides hydroelectric power to the national electric power transmission network and irrigation water to agricultural customers of the Veria plain.

=== Climate ===
Veria has a Mediterranean climate (Köppen climate classification Csa) that borders on a cold semi-arid climate (Köppen climate classification BSk). Since the city lies in a transitional climatic zone, its climate displays characteristics of continental, semi-arid and subtropical/Mediterranean climates. Summers (from April to October) are hot (often exceptionally hot) and dry (or mildly humid, with rainfalls that occur during thunderstorms), and winters (from mid-October to March) are wet and cool, but temperatures remain above or well above freezing (meteorological phenomenon of Alkyonides). Snow typically falls once or twice a season. Major temperature swings between day and night are seldom.

Climate data for Veria
Month	Jan	Feb	Mar	Apr	May	Jun	Jul	Aug	Sep	Oct	Nov	Dec	Year
Record high °C (°F)	21.0 (69.8)	24.0 (75.2)	25.4 (77.7)	31.0 (87.8)	35.0 (95.0)	39.0 (102.2)	41.0 (105.8)	42.1 (107.8)	35.9 (96.6)	33.5 (92.3)	27.0 (80.6)	25.6 (78.1)	42.1 (107.8)
Mean daily maximum °C (°F)	9.1 (48.4)	10.8 (51.4)	14.5 (58.1)	19.4 (66.9)	25.1 (77.2)	29.5 (85.1)	31.3 (88.3)	30.9 (87.6)	27.8 (82.0)	21.6 (70.9)	14.3 (57.7)	10.1 (50.2)	20.4 (68.7)
Daily mean °C (°F)	4.6 (40.3)	5.9 (42.6)	9.4 (48.9)	14.1 (57.4)	19.6 (67.3)	24.1 (75.4)	25.7 (78.3)	24.7 (76.5)	21.1 (70.0)	15.6 (60.1)	9.5 (49.1)	5.7 (42.3)	15.0 (59.0)
Mean daily minimum °C (°F)	0.6 (33.1)	1.4 (34.5)	4.4 (39.9)	8.2 (46.8)	12.8 (55.0)	16.3 (61.3)	18.0 (64.4)	17.3 (63.1)	14.1 (57.4)	9.9 (49.8)	5.3 (41.5)	1.8 (35.2)	9.2 (48.6)
Record low °C (°F)	−12.0 (10.4)	−11.0 (12.2)	−4.0 (24.8)	4.0 (39.2)	7.7 (45.9)	14.6 (58.3)	14.3 (57.7)	13.5 (56.3)	7.1 (44.8)	1.1 (34.0)	−3 (27)	−5 (23)	−12.0 (10.4)
Average precipitation mm (inches)	44.5 (1.75)	49.0 (1.93)	56.4 (2.22)	45.0 (1.77)	42.0 (1.65)	29.7 (1.17)	14.1 (0.56)	16.2 (0.64)	16.1 (0.63)	55.7 (2.19)	68.1 (2.68)	69.1 (2.72)	505.9 (19.91)
Average precipitation days	8.2	9.1	9.5	8.6	8.6	5.1	3.9	3.5	3.6	7.5	9.9	9.2	86.7
Average relative humidity (%)	76.4	73.0	73.2	68.3	64.2	57.9	57.5	62.8	66.8	73.1	77.1	78.2	69.0
Mean monthly sunshine hours	117.1	120.4	143.8	190.4	234.9	295.3	309.6	290.6	224.9	162.1	118.3	109.1	2,316.5
Source: Hellenic National Meteorological Service, National Observatory of Athens

== Economy ==
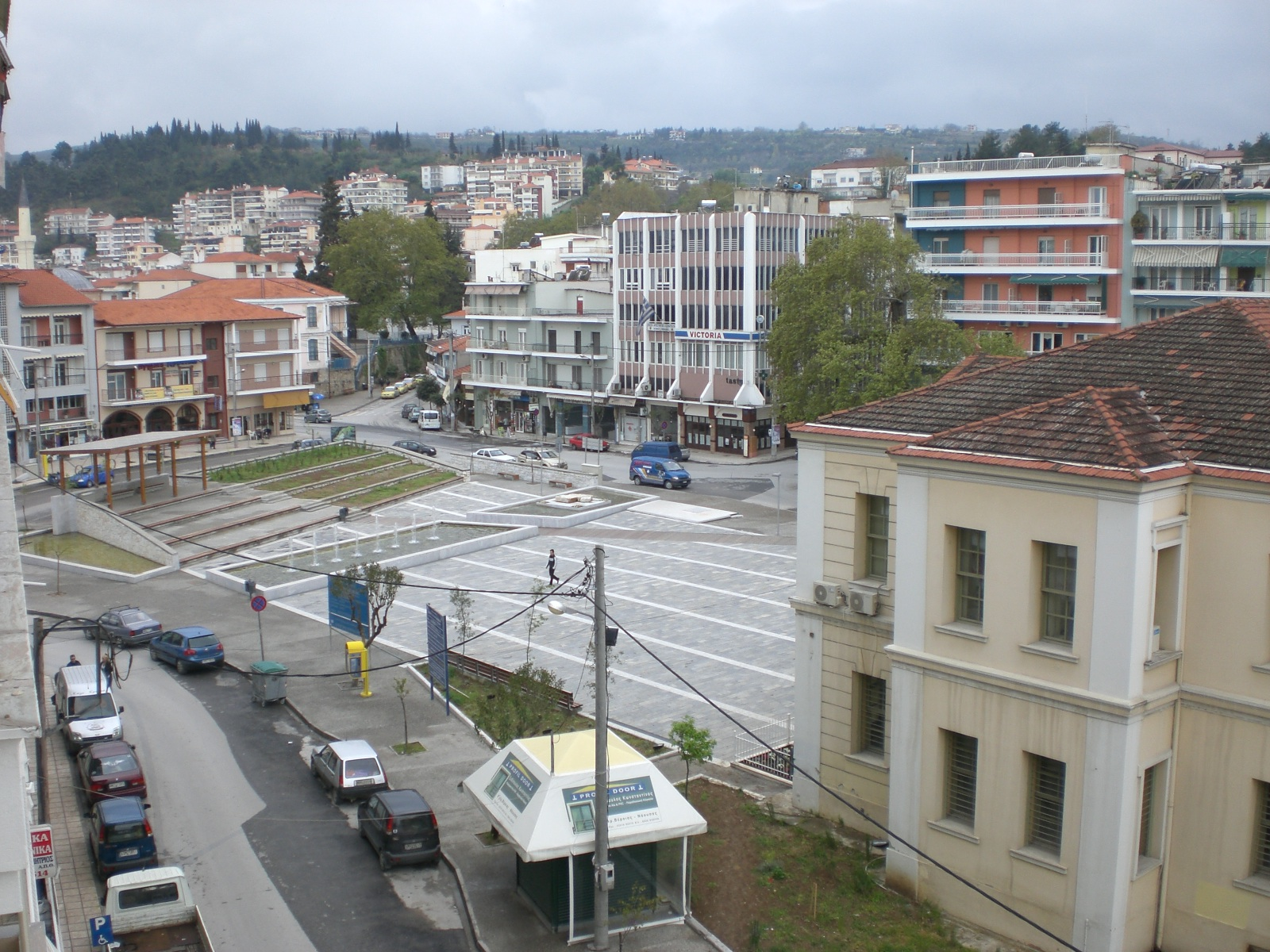
View across Roloi (Clock) Square

The modern town has cotton and woolen mills and trades in wheat, fruit and vegetables. Lignite mines operate in the area. The largest wind farm in Greece is to be constructed in the Vermio Mountains by Acciona, S.A. It will consist of 174 wind turbines, which will be connected to the national electric power transmission network, generating 614 MW.

== Transport ==
=== Road ===
The EO4 national road passes through Veria, with the A2 motorway (Egnatia Odos, also European route E90) bypassing the city to the southeast. Three provincial roads also radiate from Veria: Imathia Provincial Road 1, northbound towards Naoussa and Edessa; Provincial Road 2, westbound towards Kato Vermio; Provincial Road 5, eastbound towards Kypseli, where it meets the EO1; and Provincial Road 7, southbound towards Katerini via the EO13.

Veria is also connected to more than 500 local and national destinations via the national coach network (KTEL).

=== Rail ===
Veria is linked to Thessaloniki by the Thessaloniki-Edessa railway, with connections to Athens and Alexandroupoli.

=== Air ===
Thessaloniki International Airport "Macedonia" is the closest international airport, located 88 km (55 mi) east-northeast of Veria.

== Culture ==
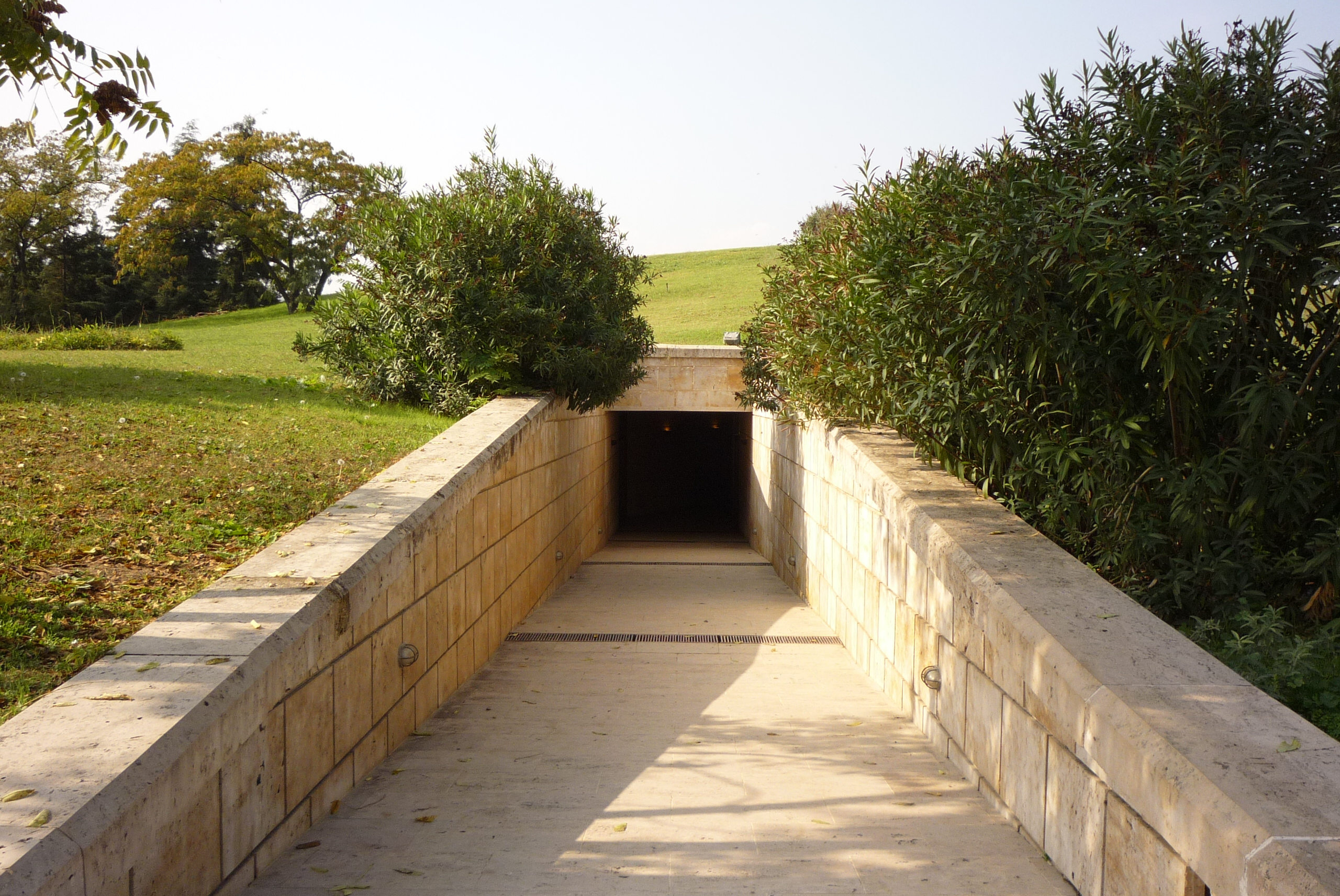
Entrance to the Macedonian tombs of Aigai (modern name Vergina)

The city has a number of Byzantine monuments, as well as post-Byzantine churches built on Byzantine foundations. The most significant Byzantine monument is the Anastasis Church (Church of the Resurrection) with its "spectacular frescoes" from 1315, bearing comparison with some of the finest works of Palaiologan art in the main Byzantine centres of Thessaloniki and Constantinople. Of the city's thirteen mosques, eight survive, including the Old Metropolis, which had been converted into the Hünkar Mosque, as well as the Orta Mosque, Mendrese Mosque, and the Mahmud Çelebi Mosque. Four other mosques, the Subashi, Bayir, Yola Geldi, and Barbuta mosques, are now used as private residences. The Twin Hamam also survives, as well as a number of Ottoman public buildings of the late 19th century. The city's famous bezesten, however, burned down in the great fire of 1864.

Museums in Veria include the Archaeological Museum of Veroia, the Byzantine Museum of Veroia, the Folklore Museum of Veroia, a museum of modern Greek history and the Aromanian cultural museum. There is also a 19th-century Jewish synagogue in the protected former Jewish neighbourhood in Barbuta.

The archaeological site of Aegae (Αἰγαί; modern name Vergina), a UNESCO World Heritage Site, lies 12 km (7 mi) south-east of the city centre of Veria.

Every summer (August 15 to September 15) the "Imathiotika" festivities take place with a cultural program deriving mainly from Veria's tradition. The site of Elia has an extensive view of the Imathia plain. Neighboring Seli is a well-known ski resort and a few kilometers outside the city is the Aliakmonas river dam.

=== Education ===
Veria has one of the largest public libraries in Greece. Originally a small single-room library with limited funds and material, it expanded into a four-story building offering multimedia, and special and rare editions. Veria's public library collaborates with many international organizations and hosts several cultural events. In 2010, it won the Access to Learning Award (ATLA) prize nominated by the Bill & Melinda Gates Foundation and the amount of $1.000.000. Since then, the library became a role model for other libraries in Greece.

The Department of Spatial Planning and Development Engineering of Aristotle University of Thessaloniki was located in Veria since 2004, but in 2013 it was relocated to Thessaloniki.

== Twin towns – sister cities ==
Veria is twinned with:

- Strovolos, Cyprus (1993)
- Kazanlak, Bulgaria
- Rognac, France
- Užice, Serbia
- Cava de' Tirreni, Italy (2024)
- Massafra, Italy (2025)

== Sports ==
Veria is home to many sports clubs. Most prominent is the handball team of Filippos Veria, competing in the first national division and which has won many championships (both national and international) over the last 40 years. The most famous is Veria 1960 which competes in Gamma Ethniki (Greece's 3rd division). Veria also has two basketball teams, AOK Veria and Filippos Veria, which compete in the local and third national division respectively.

Sport clubs based in Veria
Club	Founded	Sports	Achievements
Veria F.C.	1960	Football	Presence in A Ethniki (First division)
Veria 1960	2019	Football	Presence in Super League 2 (Second division)
Filippos Veria	1962	Handball, Basketball	Panhellenic titles in Greek Handball, one of the most successful Handball teams in Greece
GE Veria		Handball	Panhellenic titles in Greek Handball
Pontioi Veria F.C.	1984	Football	Earlier presence in Beta Ethniki
AOK Veria	1998	Basketball	Earlier presence in A2 Ethniki women

== Notable locals ==
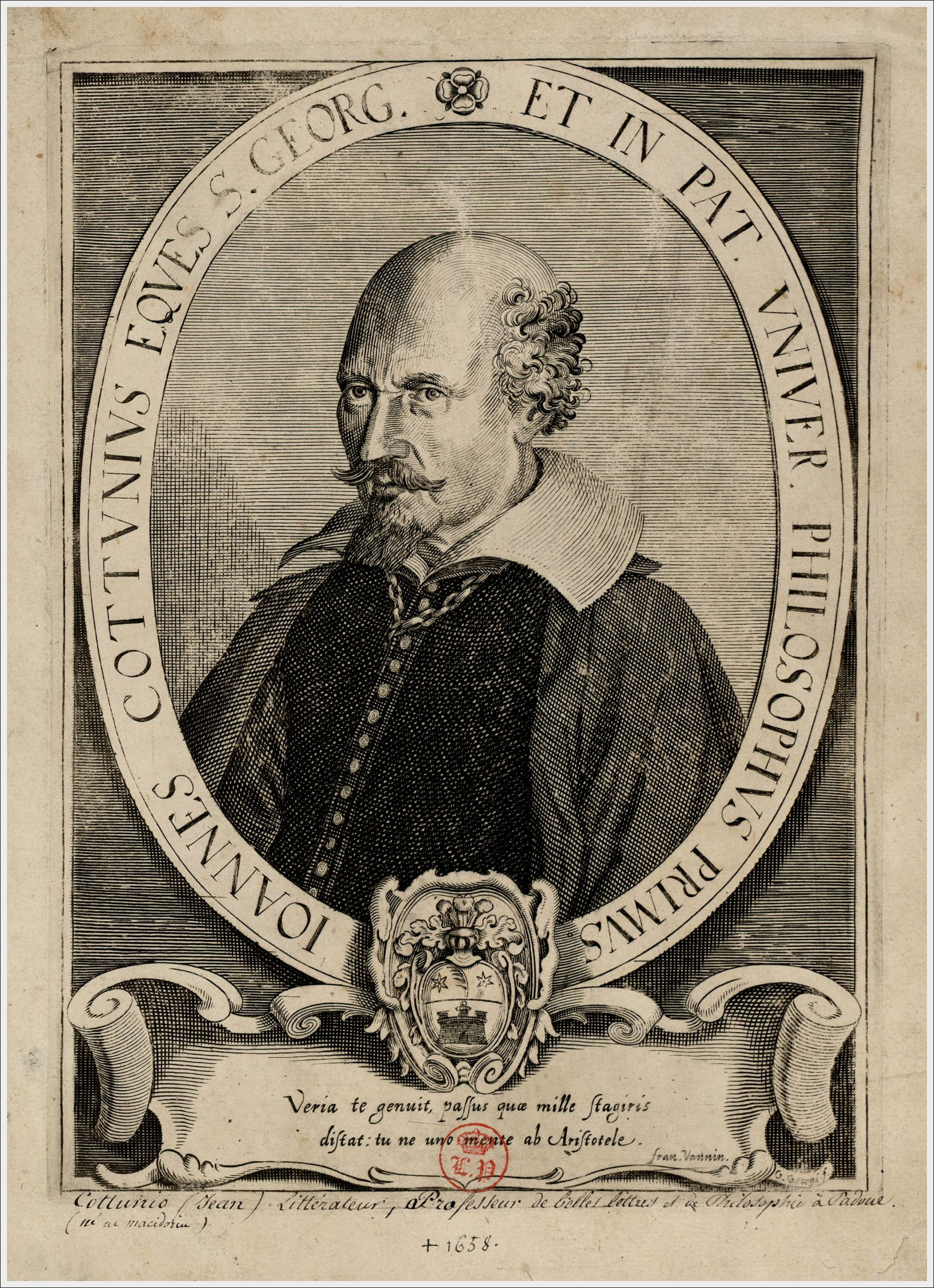
Ioannes Kottounios, Renaissance humanist and professor of Philosophy at various Italian universities, was born in Veria in 1577.

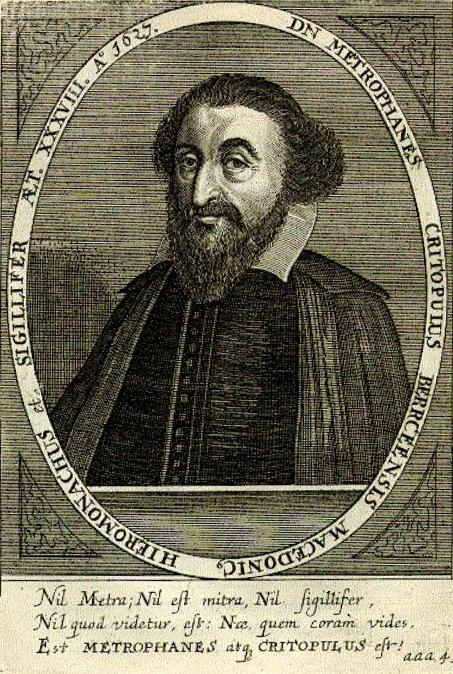
Metrophanes Kritopoulos (1589–1639); theologian and Patriarch of Alexandria

- Anastasios Karatasos, Greek fighter in the Greek Revolution of 1821
- Sopater, kinsman of Saint Paul
- Demetrius Vikelas, Greek writer; the first president of the International Olympic Committee (IOC)
- Konstantinos Raktivan, liberal politician, lawyer, Greek Council of State's first president, member of the Academy of Athens, speaker of the Hellenic Parliament
- Ioannes Kottounios, Renaissance humanist and philosopher
- Kallinikos Manios, scholar
- Konstantinos Kallokratos, teacher and poet
- Patriarch Metrophanes of Alexandria, Patriarch of Alexandria
- Patriarch Nephon I of Constantinople, Ecumenical Patriarch (Constantinople)
- Sonia Theodoridou, Greek soprano
- Efthymios Varlamis, Greek architect, sculptor and painter
- Sedat Alp, Turkish archaeologist
- Michalis Chrysochoidis, Greek politician
- Yorgos Karamihos, Greek actor
- Mimis Papaioannou, Greek football player
- Kostas Tsartsaris, Greek professional basketball player
- Yiannis Arabatzis, footballer
- Pantelis Kafes, footballer
- Panagiotis Tsalouchidis, former football player
- Pavlos Kontogiannidis, actor, singer
- Dimitris Mavropoulos, actor and theatrical director
- Toli Hagigogu, pro-Romanian activist of the Macedonian struggle, publicist against the Hellenization of Aromanians (Vlachs) in Macedonia
- George Murnu, Romanian university professor, archaeologist, historian, translator, and poet
- Elie Carafoli, Romanian engineer and aircraft designer
- Ion Caranica, Romanian, activist of Iron Guard death squads
- Sterie Ciumetti, Romanian, activist of Iron Guard
- Kyriakos Amiridis, Greek diplomat
- Konstadinos Stefanopoulos, Olympic race walker
- Sofia Ifantidou, Olympic record holder in heptathlon javelin throw
- Maria Ntanou, Olympic cross country skier
- Alexandros Papatzikos, footballer

== Gallery ==
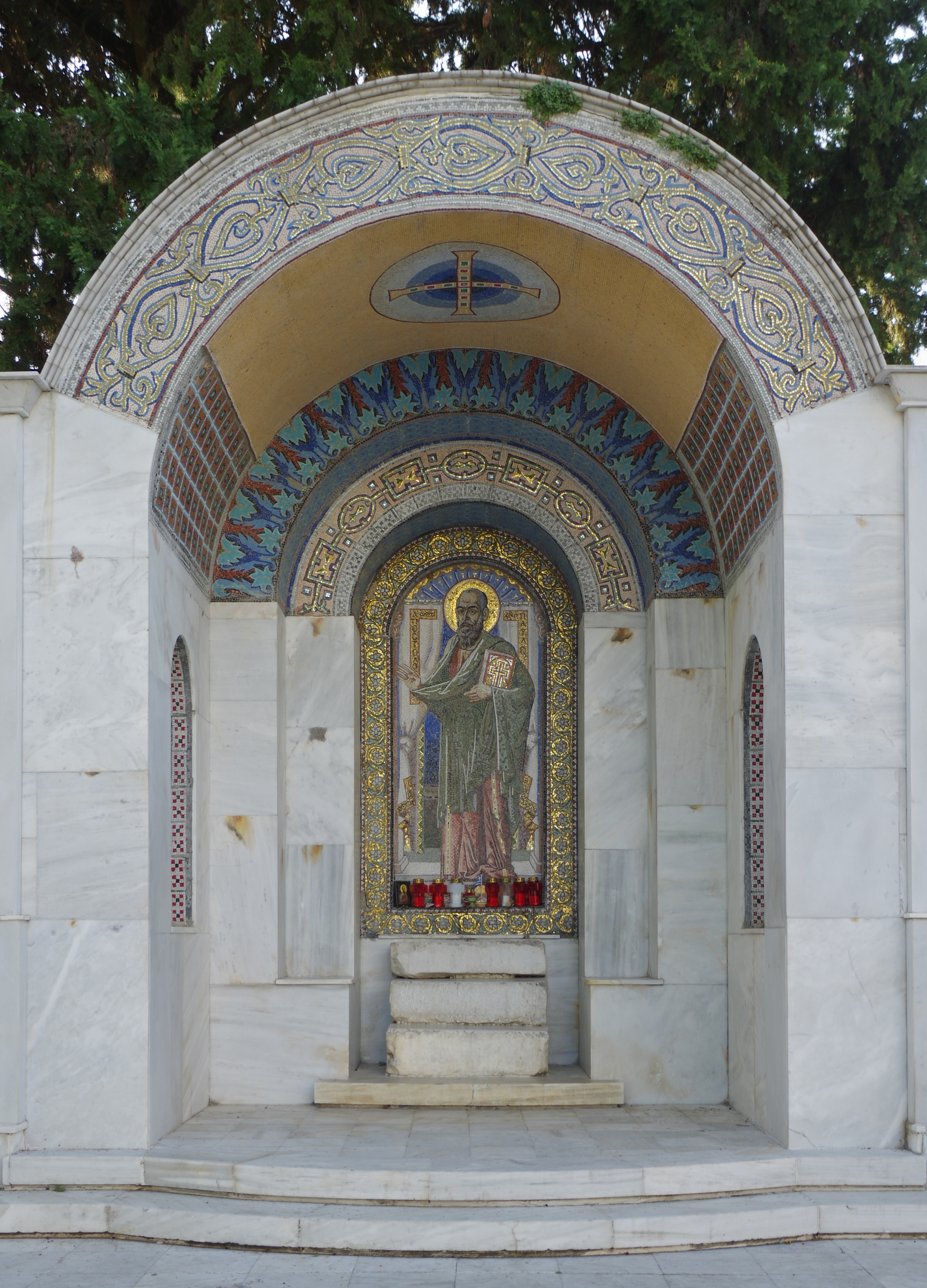
Altar of Saint Paul

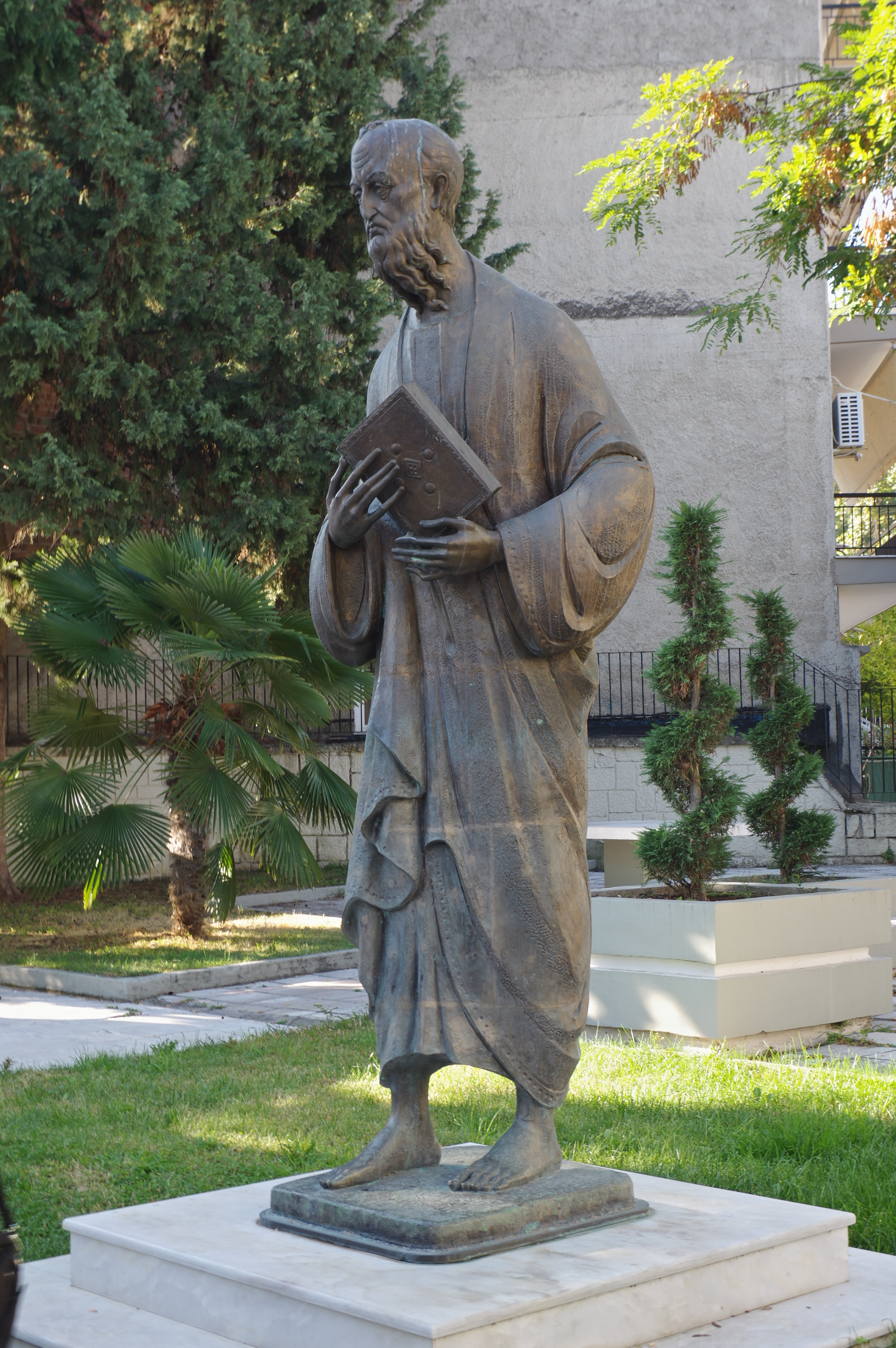
Statue of St Paul

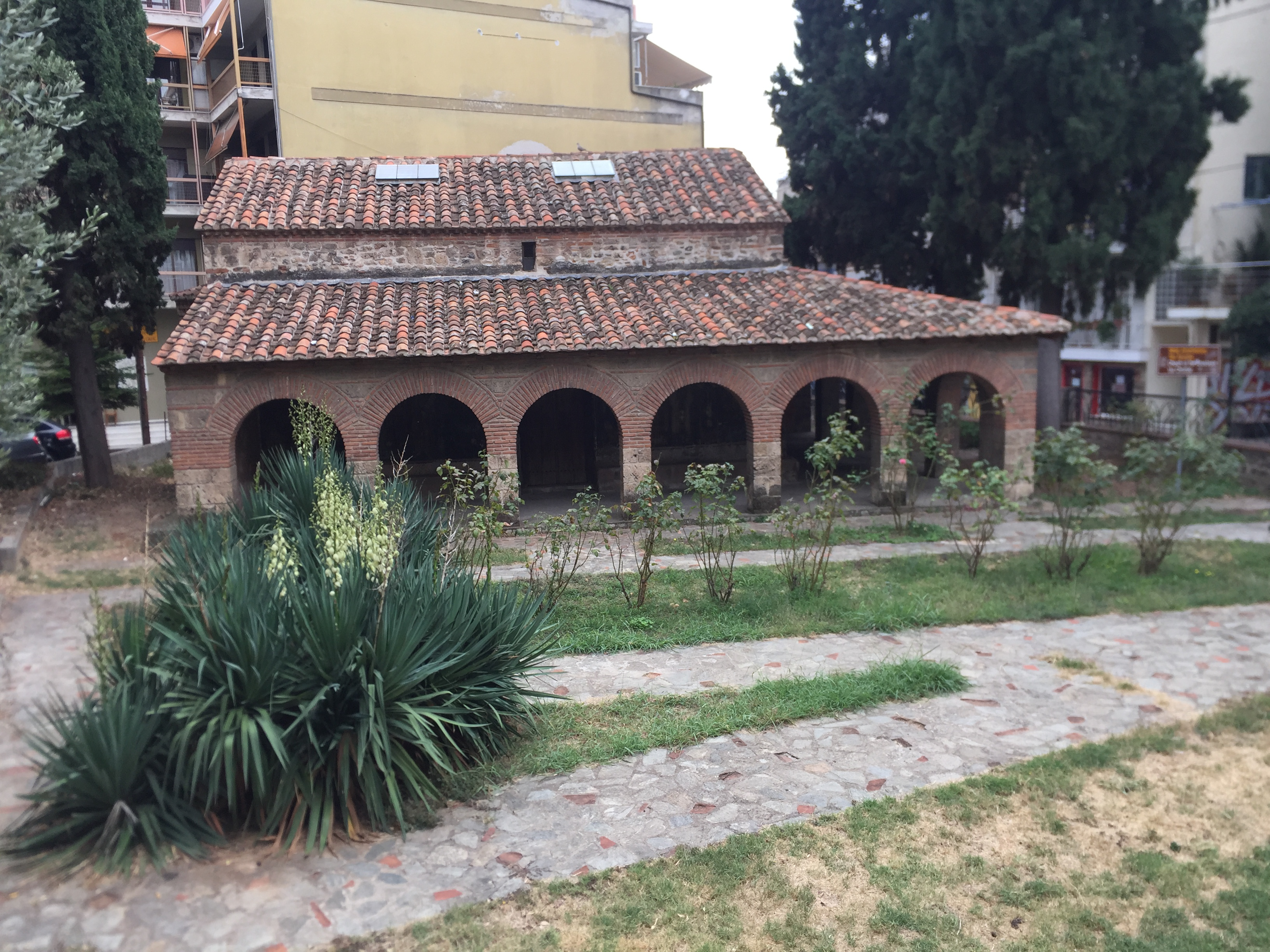
The Byzantine Church of the Resurrection

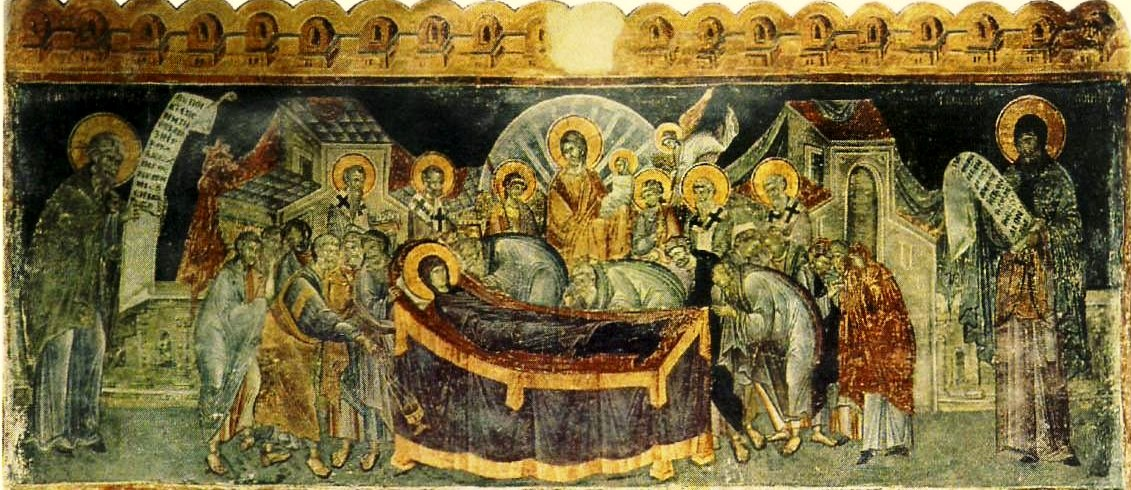
Dormition fresco (1315) by Georgios Kalliergis in the Church of the Resurrection

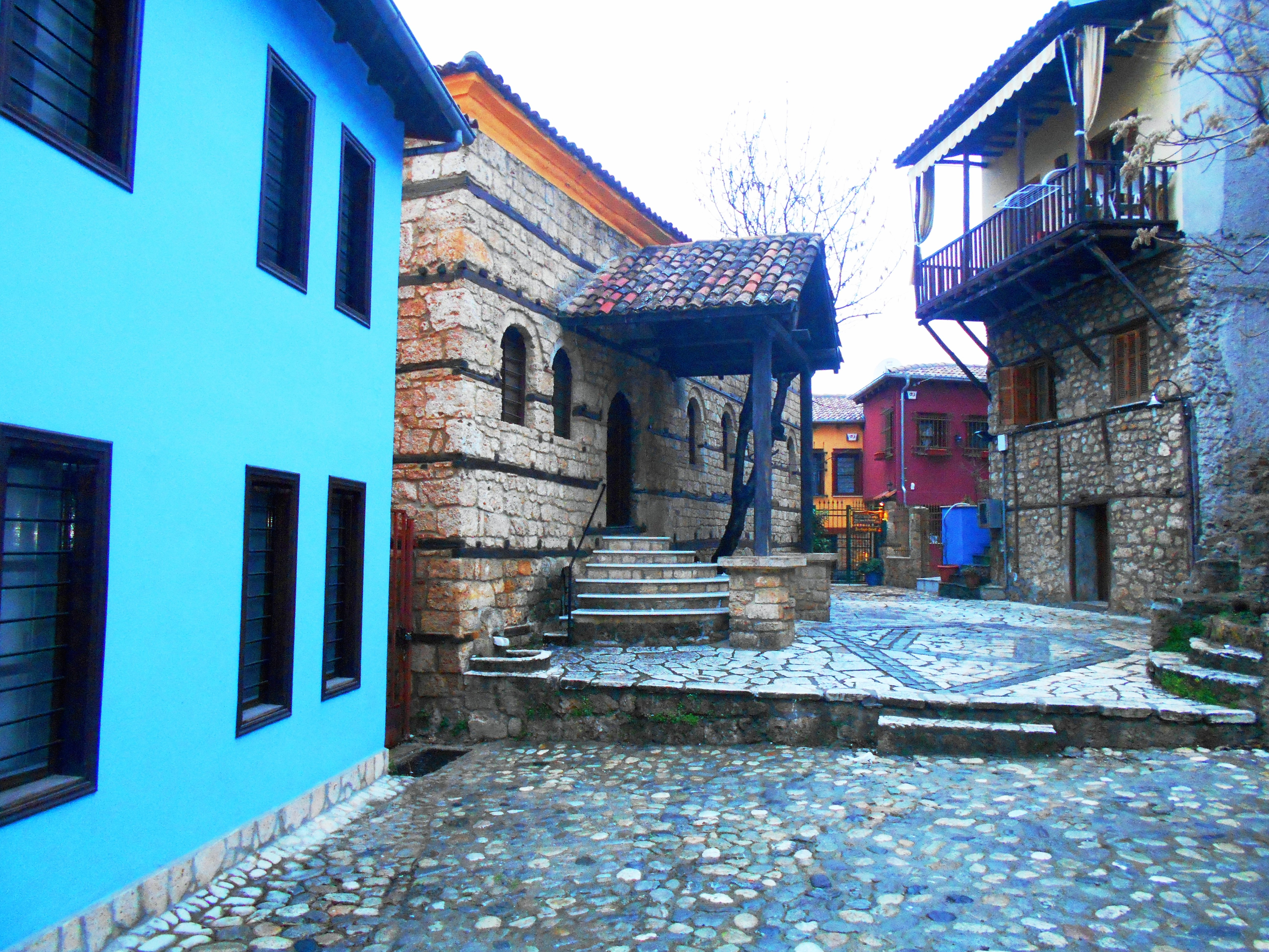
View of Barabuta, Jewish quarter

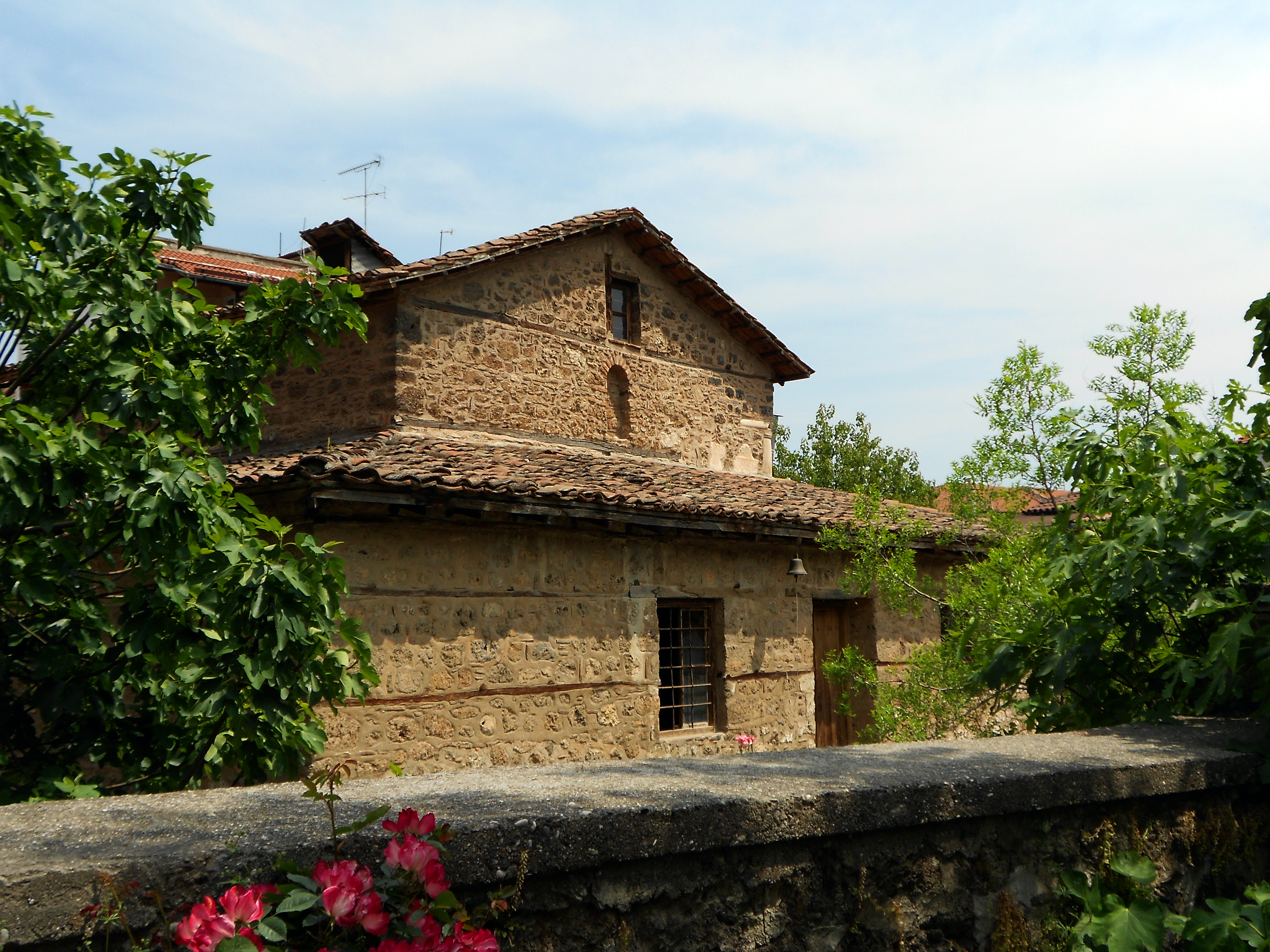
Sts Kiriqos and Ioulitta Byzantine church (14th)

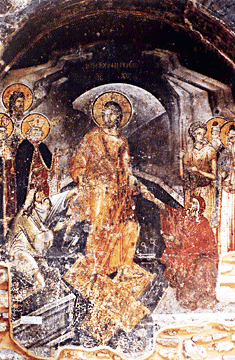
Christ fresco by Georgios Kalliergis (1315) in the Church of the Resurrection

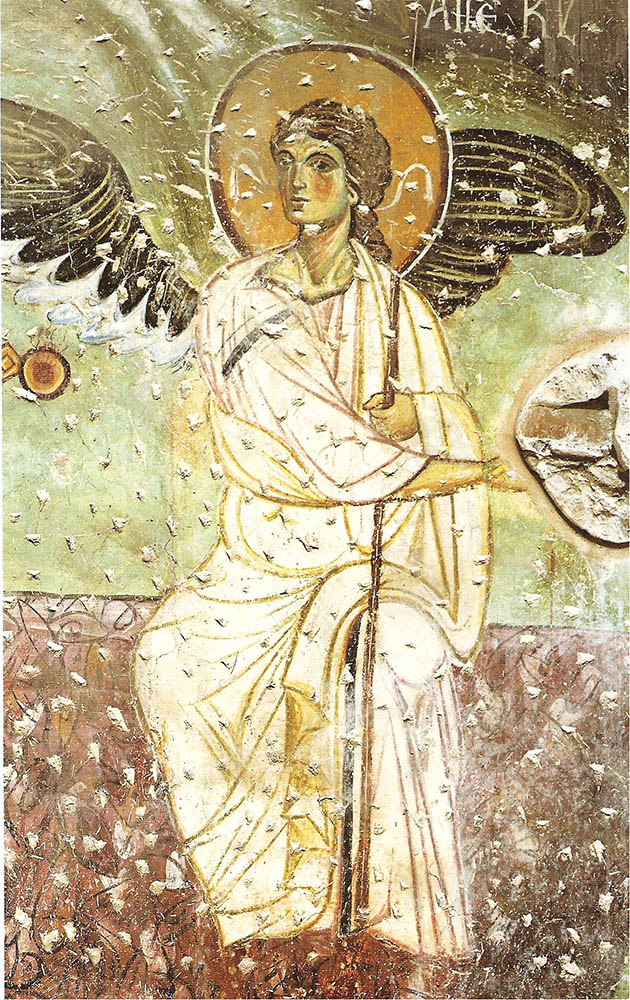
Fresco in the Old Metropolis (14th)

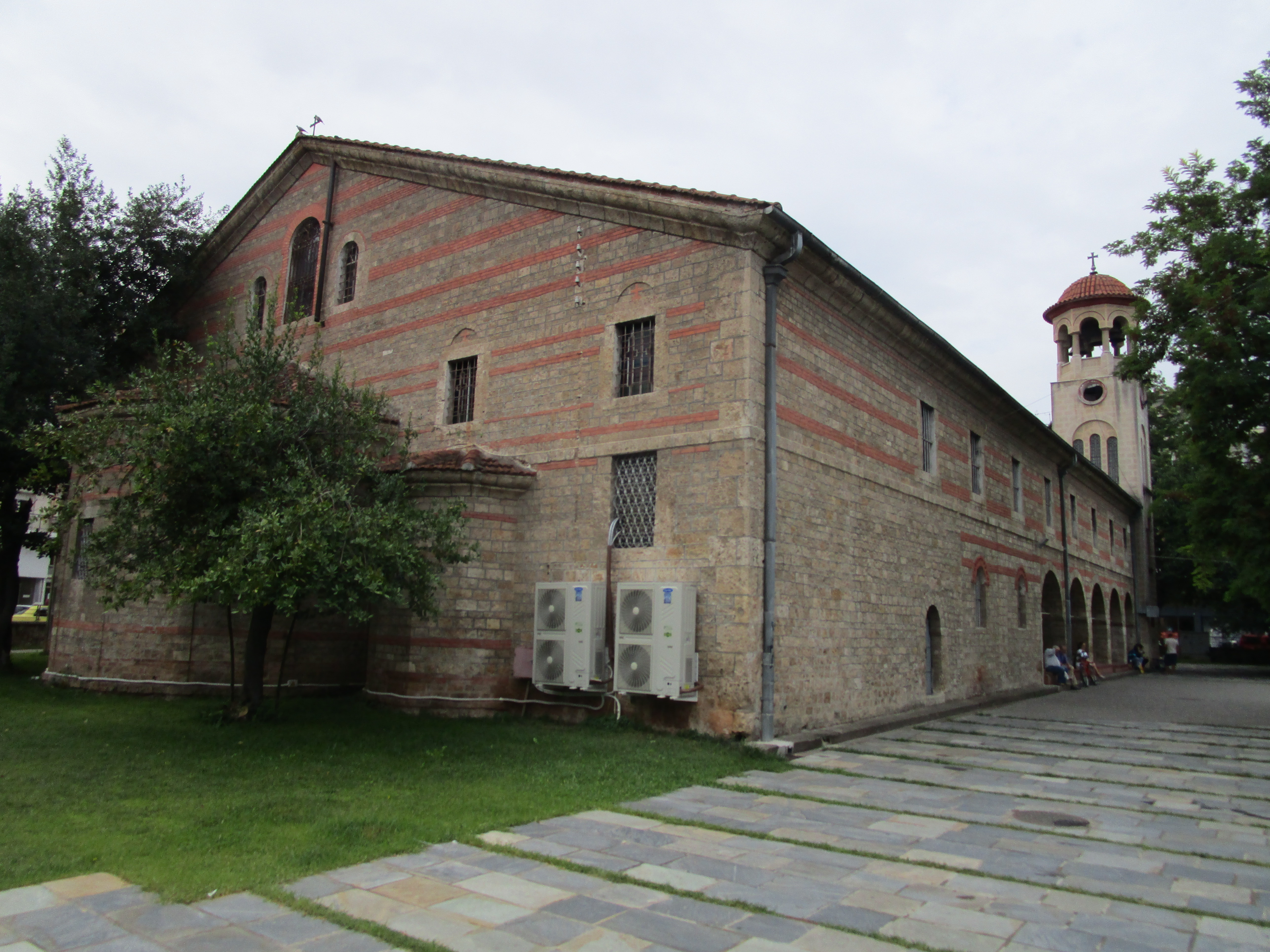
Saint Antonios church (19th)

Veria Stadium

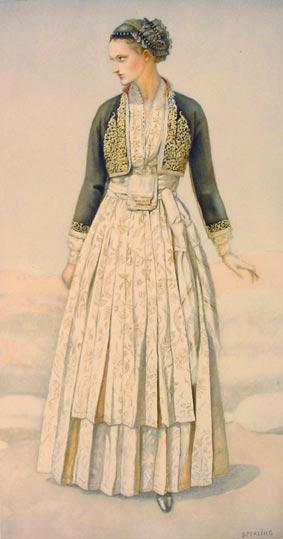
Traditional dress

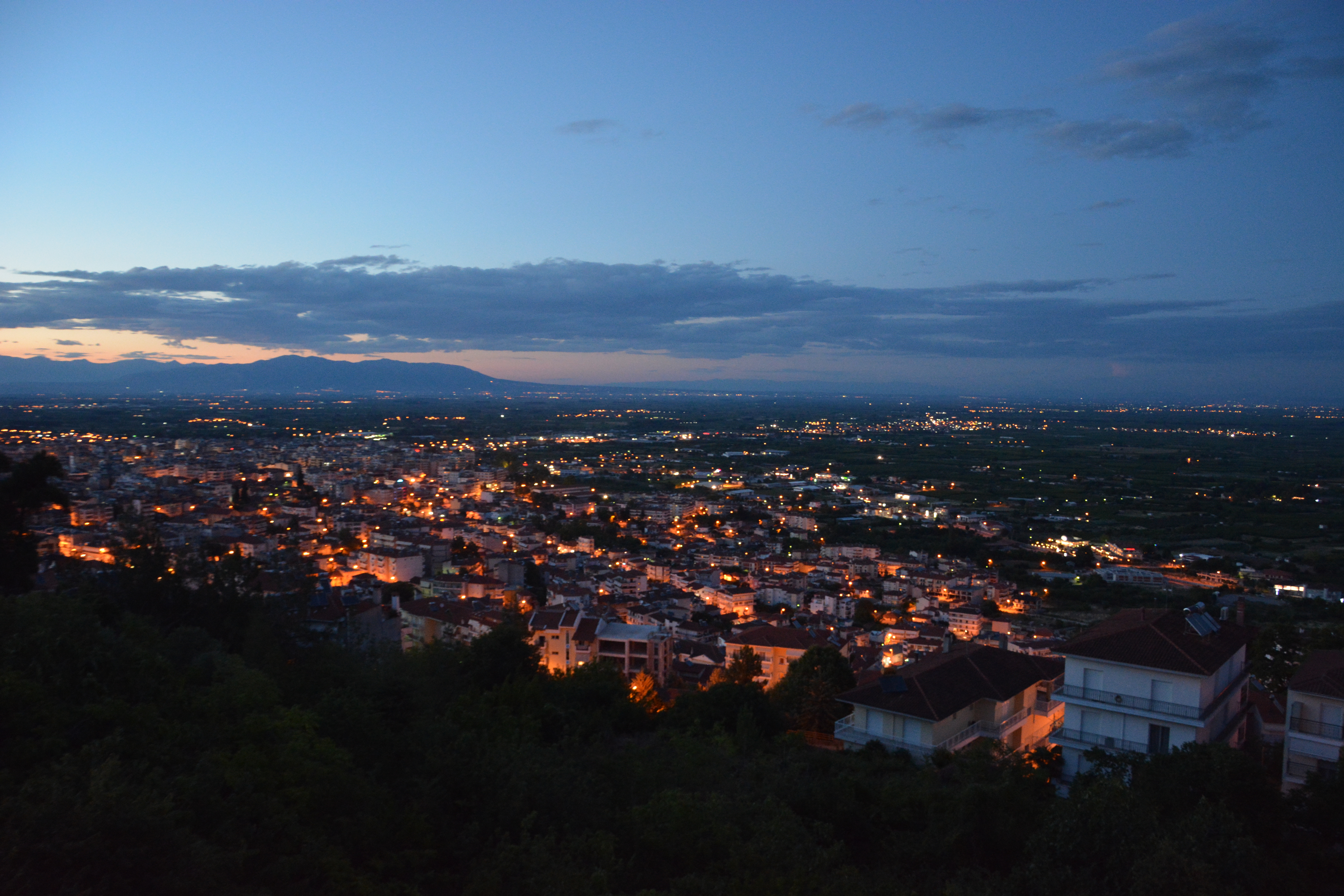
Aerial view of the city during dusk

== See also ==
- List of settlements in Imathia
- List of Catholic dioceses in Greece
- Bereans, various Protestant sects named after the city
- Murder of Alex Meschisvili

== Sources ==
Ecclesiastical history

- Mansi, Sacrorum conciliorum nova et amplissima collection, passim
- Pius Bonifacius Gams, Series episcoporum Ecclesiae Catholicae, Leipzig 1931, p. 429
- Michel Lequien, Oriens christianus in quatuor Patriarchatus digestus, Paris 1740, vol. II, coll. 69–74
- Raymond Janin, lemma '1. Berrhée' in Dictionnaire d'Histoire et de Géographie ecclésiastiques, vol. VIII, 1935, coll. 885–887

Synagogue and Jewish history

- Μεσσίνας, Ηλίας. (2022). H Συναγωγή. Αθήνα: Εκδόσεις Ινφογνώμων. ISBN 978-618-5590-21-5
- Messinas, Elias. (2022). The Synagogue of Veroia | Η Συναγωγή της Βέροιας. Seattle: KDP. ISBN 979-884-6836-06-8
- Messinas, Elias. (2022). The Synagogues of Greece: A Study of Synagogues in Macedonia and Thrace: With Architectural Drawings of all Synagogues of Greece. Seattle: KDP. ISBN 979-8-8069-0288-8

== Εxternal links ==
- Veria travel guide from Wikivoyage
- Veroia Municipality (official website)
- GCatholic
