= Murder of Alex Meschisvili =

2006 child murder in Greece

Alex Meschisvili
- Poster shot of Alex Meschisvili
- Born: 14 March 1995; Russia
- Died: 3 February 2006 (aged 10); Veria, Greece
- Mother: Natela Ichuaidze

Alex Meschisvili (14 March 1995 – 3 February 2006) was a 10-year-old boy from Veria, Greece whose parents came from Georgia. He disappeared on 3 February 2006. On 3 June 2006, the Greek press reported that five children aged 11-13 years old admitted to having hit and killed the 10-year-old, only to bury his body in the open space of a private building that was ready to be demolished. The murder was the first known case of a child's murder by teenagers in the crime history of Greece.

== Murder case ==
On 3 February, Alex had not come home after going out in a basketball field to play with some of his friends. His parents started asking around and later reported him missing. The five children he was playing with pleaded that they did not know anything at the time.

Four months later, and after tips from kids attending the same school as Alex, the police called the children back in for questioning, one at a time, and compared their alibis. The children each told different stories, so the police continued questioning them. Finally, the children cracked and each individually confirmed the place where they had buried the body of Alex. As of 2017, investigators are still looking for the body.

On June 4, 2006, the children recanted their earlier statement, saying they were bullied into admitting guilt by the police.
