= Hunker =

Hunker may refer to:

- Hunker, Pennsylvania, United States; a borough
- 19788 Hunker, a main-belt asteroid
- Jeffrey Hunker (1957-2013), an American cybersecurity expert and writer
- Hunkers, a faction of the Democratic Party in New York, United States during the mid-19th century
- Hunkering

== See also ==
- Hunk (disambiguation)
