= Hunkar =

Hunkar or Hünkar may also refer to:

- Hunkar (epic poem), an epic poem by Rashtrakavi Ramdhari Singh 'Dinkar'
- Hünkar (restaurant), a restaurant in Istanbul, Turkey
- Emperor
- Shah
- Sultan

== See also ==
- Hünkar Mosque (disambiguation)
