= The Hunks =

Reality television series

The Hunks is a reality television series which first aired on 19 April 2011 on Sky Living. The series follows 10 "Hunky" males spending the summer in Newquay, Cornwall and lasted for 6 Episodes until 24 May 2011.

The series was never released on DVD and there has been no official confirmation of a second series from Sky.

== Cast ==
- Mario Bundalian
- Joryl Peter Laserna
- Leandro Dayot
- Kevin Roa
- Anton Reyes
- Andy Bradley
- Dom Carpenter
- Florian Raffone
- Jamie Spencer
- Marc Burgum
- Sam Grant
- Samy Thompson
- Sean Chard
- Vaughan Bailey
