= Old Metropolis, Veria =

Historic building in Veroia, Greece

Old Metropolis
- Παλαιά Μητρόπολη (Τζαμί του Χουνκιάρ)
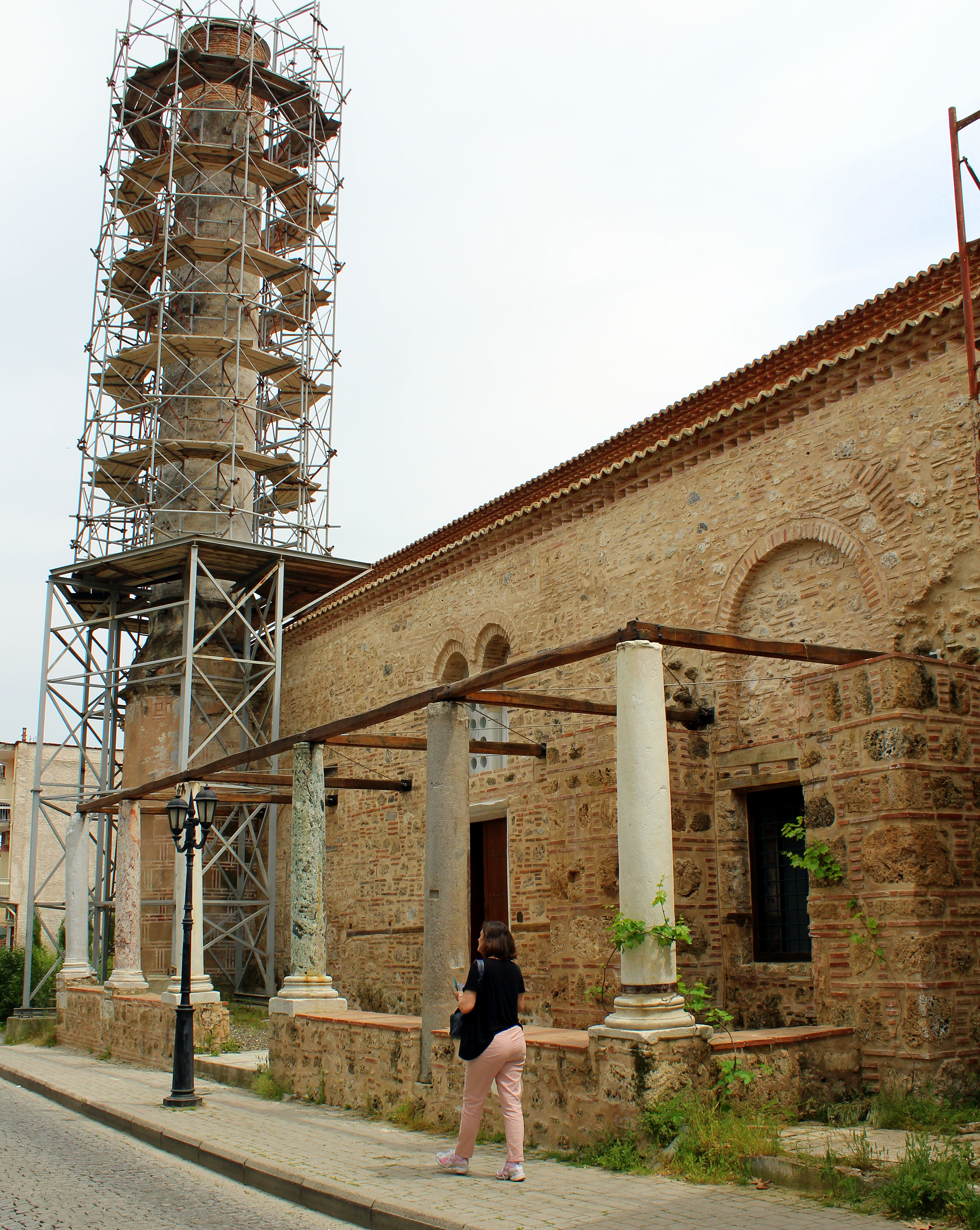
- Restoration in progress in 2018

- Location of the former cathedral-mosque in Greece

Religion
- Affiliation: Greek Orthodox (former); Islam (former)
- Ecclesiastical or organisational status: Cathedral (11th century–1430); Mosque (1430–1912)
- Status: Abandoned (as a mosque); Restoration (in progress as a church)

Location
- Location: Veria, Central Macedonia
- Country: Greece
- Interactive map of Old Metropolis
- Coordinates: 40°31′21″N 22°12′06″E

Architecture
- Type: Basilica
- Style: Byzantine
- Completed: 11th century; 1430 (mosque modifications)

Specifications
- Minaret: 1
- Materials: Brick; stone; marble; tiles

The Old Metropolis (Greek: Παλαιά Μητρόπολη) is a former Byzantine Greek Orthodox basilica dedicated to Saint Paul, located in the city of Veria, in the Central Macedonia region of northern Greece. Built as a cathedral in the early 11th-century during the Venetian period, in 1430 the structure was converted to a mosque, called the Hünkar Mosque (Greek: Τζαμί του Χουνκιάρ, meaning "Imperial Mosque" in Turkish) during the Ottoman era. The mosque was abandoned in 1912 after the Balkan Wars and was reconsecrated as a church. It was used for some time for non-religious purposes before renovation work began in 2016 to restore it as a church.

== History ==
Veria fell to the Ottoman Empire in 1430, and the metropolitan cathedral was converted into a mosque named after the Ottoman Sultan (Hünkar means "sovereign, emperor"). The Ottomans made a few alterations to the building, replacing the semi-circular arches of the upper windows to pointed ones, and demolished the northern portion of the transept to add a plain minaret. The external decoration of ancient Greek motifs remained unaltered but survive only in fragments today, but in the interior they covered up the 13th-century frescoes with plaster, damaging them in the process as they drilled holes to make the plaster stick.

Following the capture of the city by the Greek Army during the First Balkan War in October 1912, the mosque was reconsecrated and functioned for a period as a church. It then passed to the local "Apostle Paul" Christian Union, housed government agencies during the World War I and World War II, and was used as a stable during the German occupation of Greece. As of 2007, the building remained in a half-ruined state, without proper maintenance or restoration work being undertaken.

In October 2010 restoration of the site was commenced by the 11th Ephorate of Byzantine Antiquities, funded by the European Union through the Partnership Agreement for the Development Framework 2007–13, with a budget of €3,465,000. The work involved extensive interventions to enhance the building's structural stability and preserve the rediscovered frescoes, as well as the elements added during the Ottoman-era use as a mosque. Following completion of the restoration work, the church was to be re-consecrated on 5 June 2016 by the Bishop of Veria and Naousa, and re-opened to the public from 1 July 2016.

Following the renovation, the church does not hold mass or liturgy services daily, but only on major holidays and celebrations; the rest of the year it is open as a museum and archaeological site.

== Architecture ==
The building, dating from the early 11th century, is considered one of the largest surviving middle Byzantine buildings in the Balkans, and one of the largest cathedrals in the region of Macedonia, but its early history is obscure apart from a single inscription on its western entrance that records that it was the work of a certain Niketas, who is attested as the city's bishop in 1078. Opinions differ as to its original consecration, which was believed to be either to Saints Peter and Paul or to the Twelve Apostles, but during restoration work in 2010–16 a fresco depicting the enthroned Theotokos was discovered above the church's main northern gate, indicating that the church was dedicated to her. It is a typical three-aisled basilica and a rudimentary transept. The main aisle is framed by alternating pessaries and columns topped by reused Ionic order capitals. The southern aisle no longer survives, having collapsed at an unknown date.

== Gallery ==
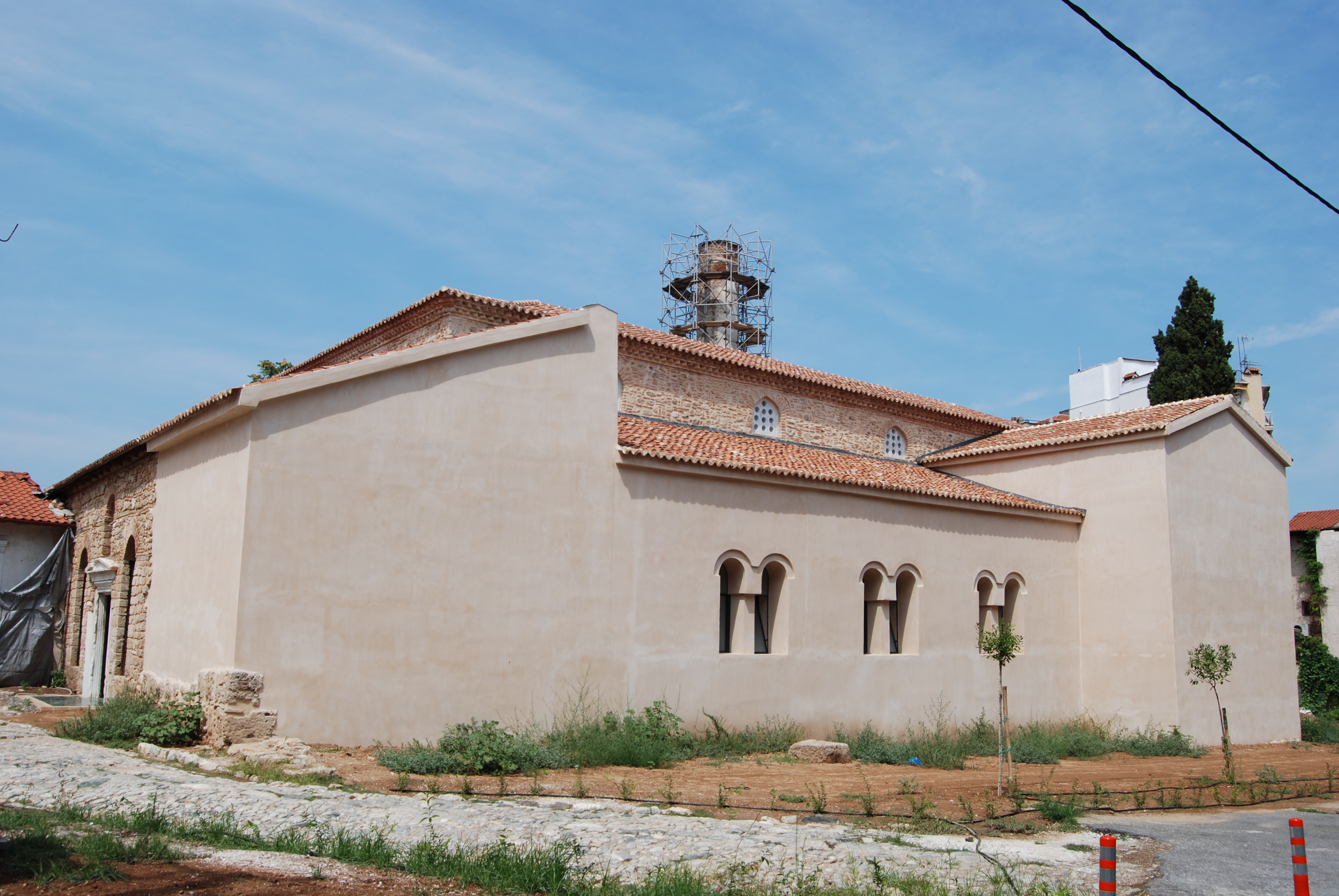
Rear exterior view

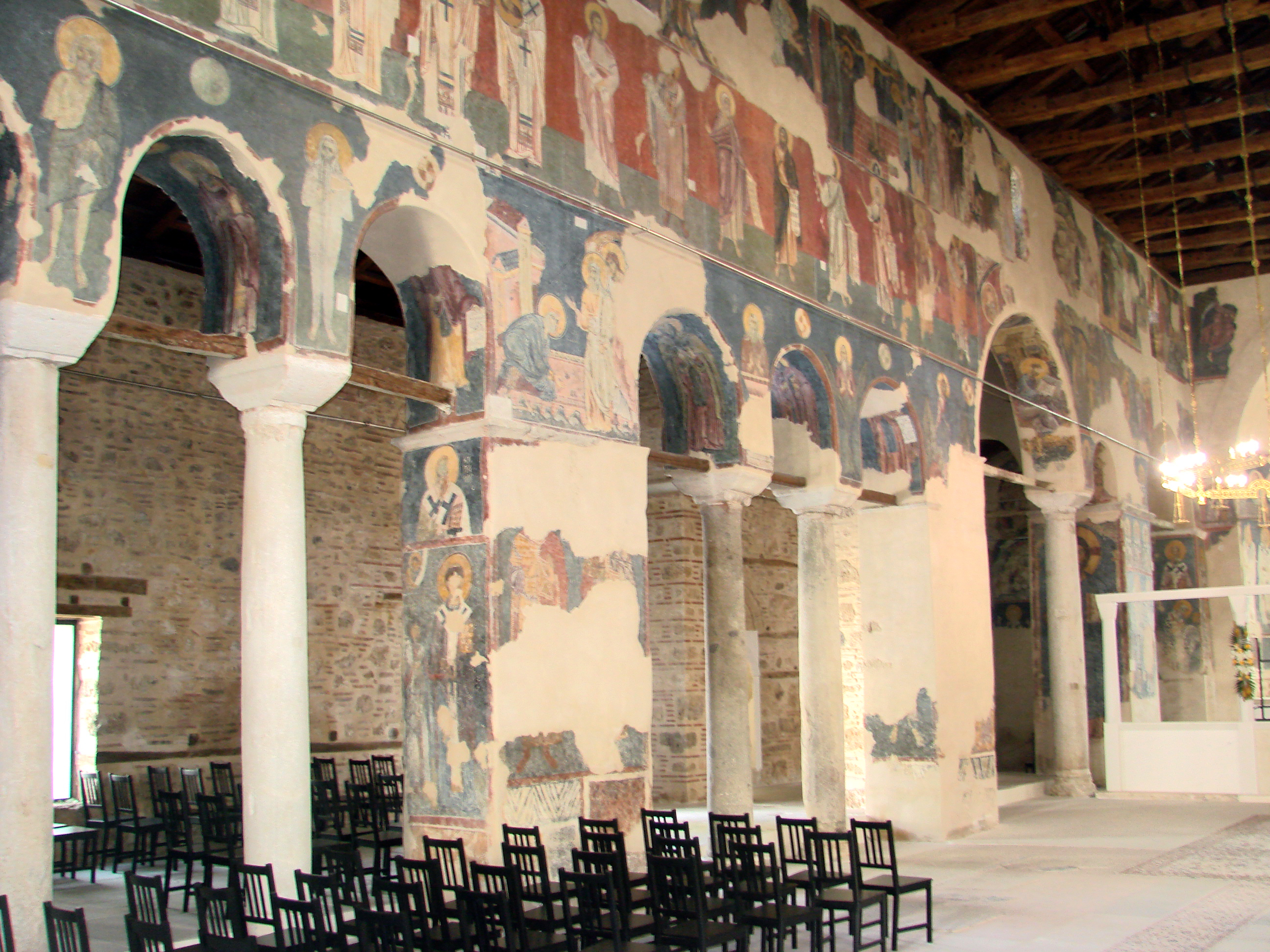
Interior

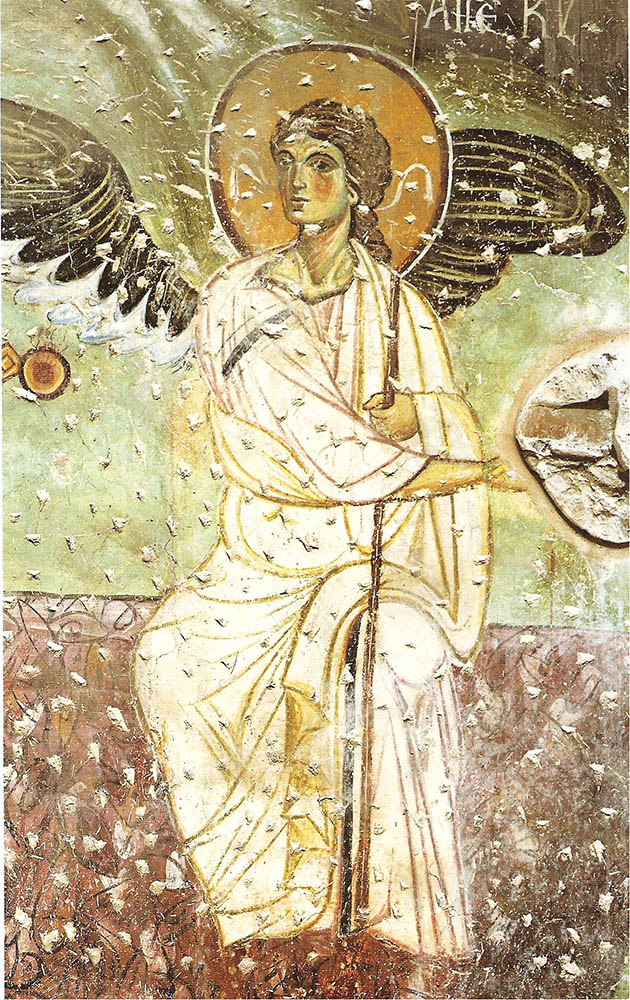
Fresco revealed

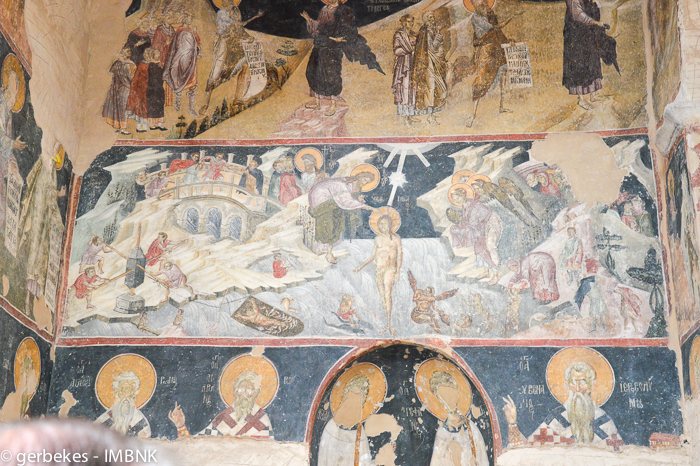
More frescoes

== See also ==
- Byzantine Greece
- Islam in Greece
- List of former mosques in Greece
- List of churches in Greece
- Ottoman Greece
