= Hunk (nickname) =

Hunk is a nickname of:

- Harry W. Anderson (1922–2018), American businessman, art collector, and philanthropist
- Hunk Anderson (1898–1978), American College Football Hall of Fame player and college and National Football League coach
- Edgar Humphreys (1914–1944), British Second World War pilot and prisoner of war executed for participating in the "Great Escape"
