= Aegae (Macedonia) =

Original capital of Macedon

Aigai
- Αἰγαί (Ancient Greek)
- Aegae
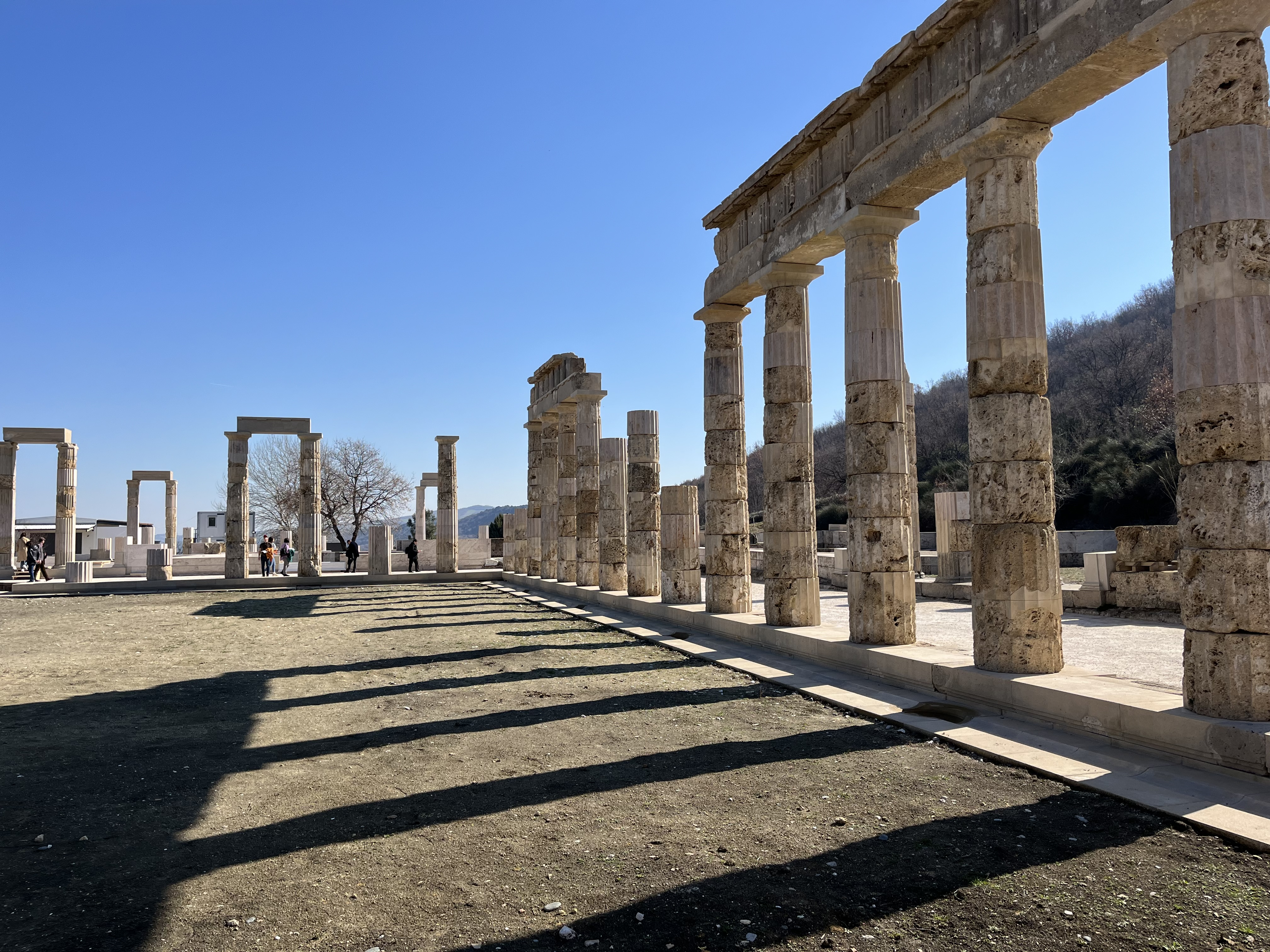
- Palace of Aigai

- Location within Greece
- 40.471°N 22.318°E
- Type: Capital city, later religious centre and ceremonial burial ground
- Periods: Archaic, Classical, Hellenistic, and Roman
- Cultures: Ancient Greece
- Location: Vergina, Central Macedonia, Greece
- Part of: kingdom of Macedon

History
- Built: ~750 BC
- Abandoned: ~300 AD

Site notes
- Architectural style: Ancient Greek architecture
- Archaeologists: Léon Heuzey, Manolis Andronikos, Angeliki Kottaridi
- Owner: Greek state (Note: According to Greek Law 3028/2002: All archaeological discoveries in Greece dated pre-1453, both movable and immovable, are property of the State outright.)
- Management: General Directorate of Antiquities and Cultural Heritage; Ephorate of Antiquities of Imathia
- Public access: Open to public
- Website: www.aigai.gr/en

Designations
- Designation: World Heritage Site

UNESCO World Heritage Site
- Official name: Archaeological Site of Aegae (modern name Vergina)
- Criteria: Cultural: i, iii
- Reference: 780
- Inscription: 1996 (20th Session)
- Area: 1,420.81 ha (3,510.9 acres)
- Buffer zone: 4,811.73 ha (11,890.0 acres)

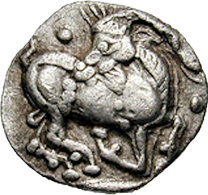
Silver coin from Aegae depicting a goat, reign of Amyntas I or Alexander I, c. 510–480 BC

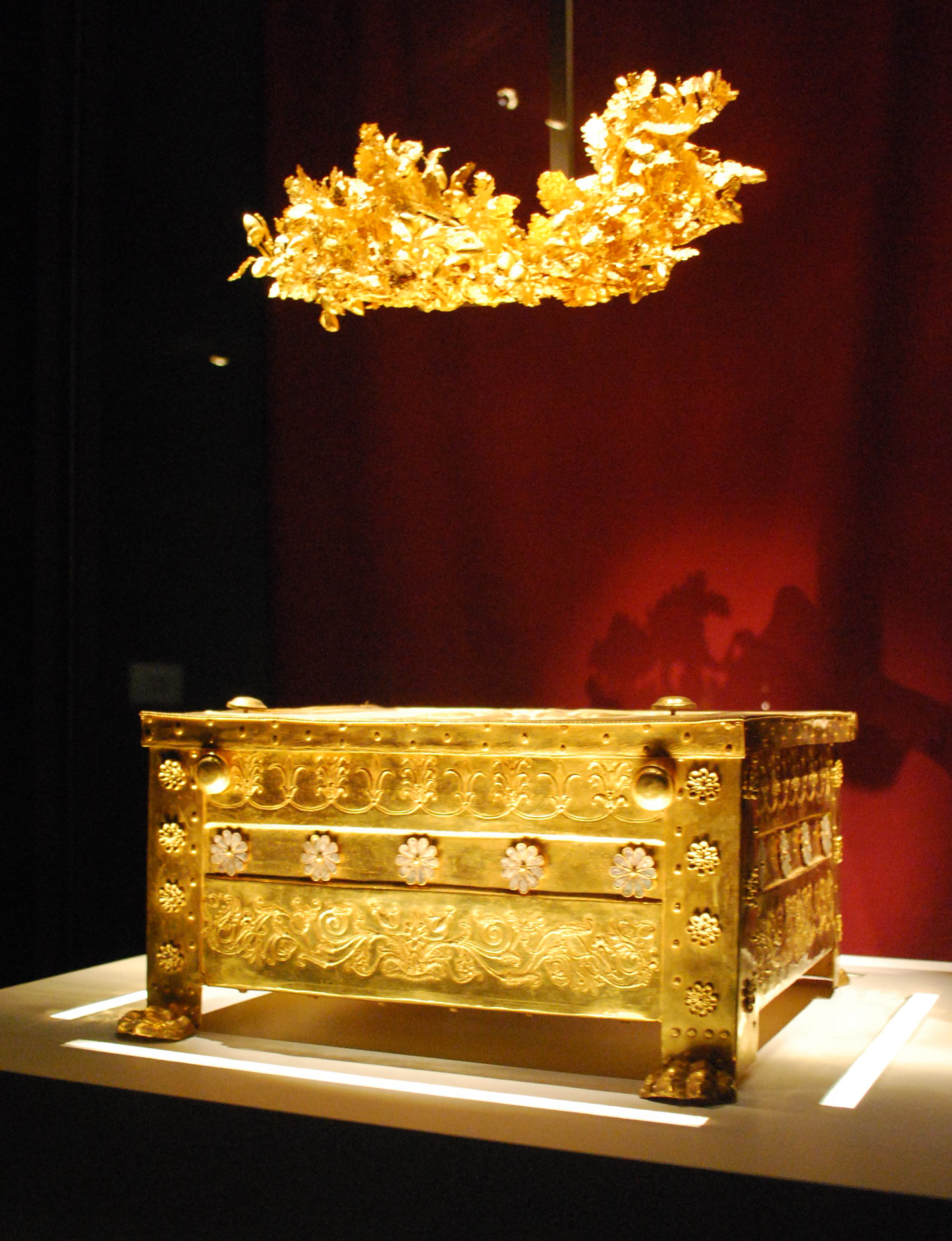
The golden larnax and the golden grave crown of Philip II

Aegae or Aigai (Ancient Greek: Αἰγαί, Aigaí, Latinized: Aegae, Greek: Αιγές, romanized: Aiges) was the original capital of Macedon, the ancient Greek kingdom of the Argeads in Lower Macedonia. Aigai was located in the Haliacmon valley on the foothills of the Pierian Mountains, between the modern towns of Vergina and Palatitsia, overlooking the central Macedonian plain, in northern Greece. Alexander the Great was proclaimed king of Macedon at Aigai when his father Philip II was assassinated at the city's theatre.

The city was abandoned in the 3rd century AD and was rediscovered in the 19th. Three major archaeological missions have been carried out at Aigai. The first was led by Léon Heuzey of the French School at Athens in the 1860s; Manolis Andronikos led excavations over a century later and made many important discoveries, including the tomb of Philip II of Macedon and the Golden Larnax bearing the Vergina Sun; and Angeliki Kottaridi led restoration efforts in the 2000s. Today it is the site of an archaeological site and two museums. In 1996, the archaeological site of Aigai was inscribed on the UNESCO World Heritage List because of its monumental significance in Western civilization and exceptional architecture.

== Name ==
The name Aigai is etymologically related to the word for 'goat' (Ancient Greek: αἴξ, romanized: aíx), and is translated as 'goat town'. Diodorus Siculus claimed the city was so named after Perdiccas I received an instruction by the Pythia at the Oracle of Delphi to establish his city at a place where "white-horned goats rest at dawn". This version, supported by Thucydides, was the 'official' founding myth in the 5th century BC. In the Epitome of the Philippic History, Justin gives a different account whereby Edessa was the older name of Aegae before it was captured by Caranus of Macedon. As a result, Edessa was historically thought to have been the site of Aigai.

Aigai also appears in the historical record as Aegeae/Aigeai (Αἰγέαι) and Aegaea/Aigaia (Αἰγαῖα). The name is in the plural, a typical feature of ancient Greek toponyms such as Athens (Ἀθῆναι, Athenai) and Thebes (Θῆβαι, Thebai). In modern Greek the name is Aiges (Αιγές, Greek pronunciation: [eˈʝes]), showing a typical first declension transition from ancient plural ending -ai to the modern -es.

== History ==
In the 7th century BC, the Temenids' dominance led to the Macedonians expanding and subduing local populations until the end of the 6th century BC, and establishing the dynasty at Aigai. Ancient sources give conflicting accounts of the origins of the Argead dynasty. Alexander I is the first truly historic figure and, based on the line of succession, the beginnings of the Macedonian dynasty have been traditionally dated to 750 BC. Herodotus says that the Argead dynasty was an ancient Greek royal house led by Perdiccas I who fled from Argos in about 650 BC.

The Macedonians perceived the state founded by the Argeads as a typical ancient Greek city-state (Polis), with Aigai as an urban centre (ἄστυ) ruling over the surrounding countryside (χώρα), not basically different from Athens or Sparta; to what degree this perception was historically accurate is not clear. Archaeologic evidence shows that Aigai developed as an organized collection of villages, spatially representing the aristocratic structure of tribes centred on the power of the king. It remained so throughout its history. Indeed, Aigai never became a large city and most of its inhabitants lived in surrounding villages. The walled asty (acropolis) was built at the centre of Aigai. From Aigai the Macedonians spread to the central part of Macedonia and displaced the local population of Pierians. From 513 to 480 BC Aigai was part of the Persian Empire, but Amyntas I managed to keep its relative independence, avoid satrapy and extend its possessions. In the first half of the 5th century BC Aigai was the capital of Macedon. Life reached unseen levels of luxury and to meet the needs of the court merchants from all over the ancient world brought to Aigai valuable goods including perfume, carved ornaments and jewellery. The city wall was built in the 5th century, probably by Perdiccas II. At the end of the 5th century Archelaus I brought to his court artists, poets, and philosophers from all over the Greek world; for example, it was at Aigai that Euripides wrote and presented his last tragedies.

At the beginning of the 4th century BC, Archelaus transferred the Macedonian capital northeast to Pella, which was located on a coastal waterway of the Thermaic Gulf, on the central Macedonian plain. Nevertheless, Aigai retained its role as the sacred city of the Macedonian kingdom, the site of the traditional cult centres, a royal palace and the royal tombs. For this reason it was here that Philip II was attending the wedding of his daughter Cleopatra to King Alexander of Epirus when he fell by the hand of Pausanias of Orestis in the theatre. His son Alexander the Great was proclaimed king of Macedonia on the spot. The old capital had remained the "national hearth" of the Macedonian kingdom and the burial place for their kings who descended from Perdiccas. The body of Alexander was to have also reposed at Aigai, but it was taken to Memphis by Ptolemy I Soter. The urban fabric of the city represents a pivotal moment of transition between the classical Greek city-state and the imperial centres of the Hellenistic period. The bitter struggles between the heirs of Alexander in the 3rd century adversely affected the city; in 276 BC Gallic mercenaries of Pyrrhus plundered many of the tombs.

After the overthrow of the Macedonian kingdom by the Romans in 168 BC, both old and new capitals were destroyed, the walls pulled down and all buildings burned. In the 1st century AD, a landslide destroyed what had been rebuilt (excavations establish that parts were still inhabited then). In the 2nd to 5th centuries AD the population gradually moved from the foothills of the Pierian range to the plain, and all that remained was a small settlement whose name alone Palatitsia (palace) indicated its former importance.

== Tomb of Philip II and other Royal Tombs of Aigai ==
Prior to the discoveries at Vergina, Edessa was thought to be the site of Aigai. In 1977, Greek archaeologist Manolis Andronikos started excavating the Great Tumulus at Aigai and found that two of the four tombs in the tumulus were undisturbed since antiquity. Moreover, these two, and particularly Tomb II, contained fabulous treasures and objects of great quality and sophistication.

Although there was much debate for some years, Tomb II has been shown to be that of Philip II as indicated by many features, including the greaves, one of which was shaped consistently to fit a leg with a misaligned tibia (Philip II was recorded as having broken his tibia). Also, the remains of the skull show damage to the right eye caused by the penetration of an object (historically recorded to be an arrow).

The most recent research gives further evidence that Tomb II contains the remains of Philip II.

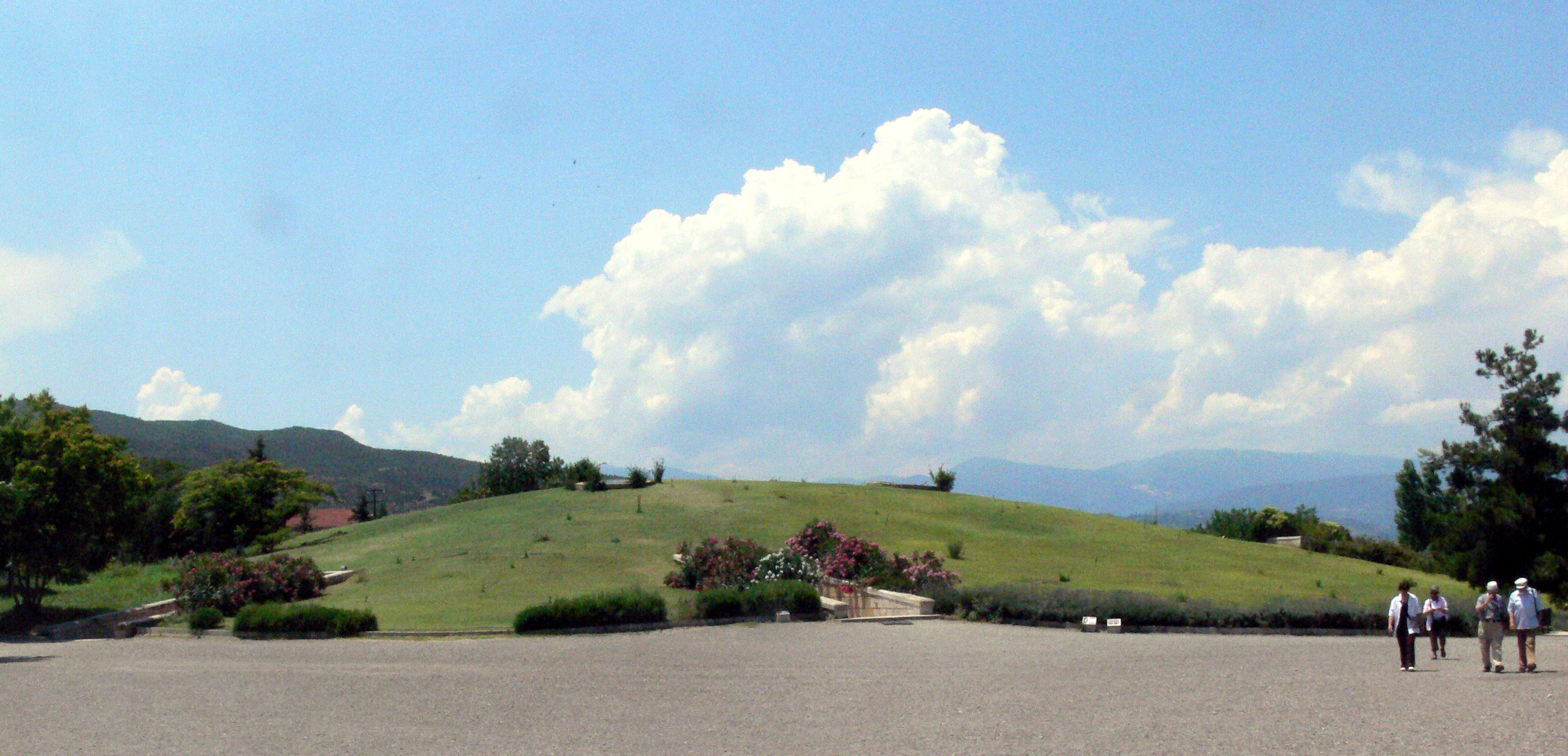
Great Tumulus of Aigai

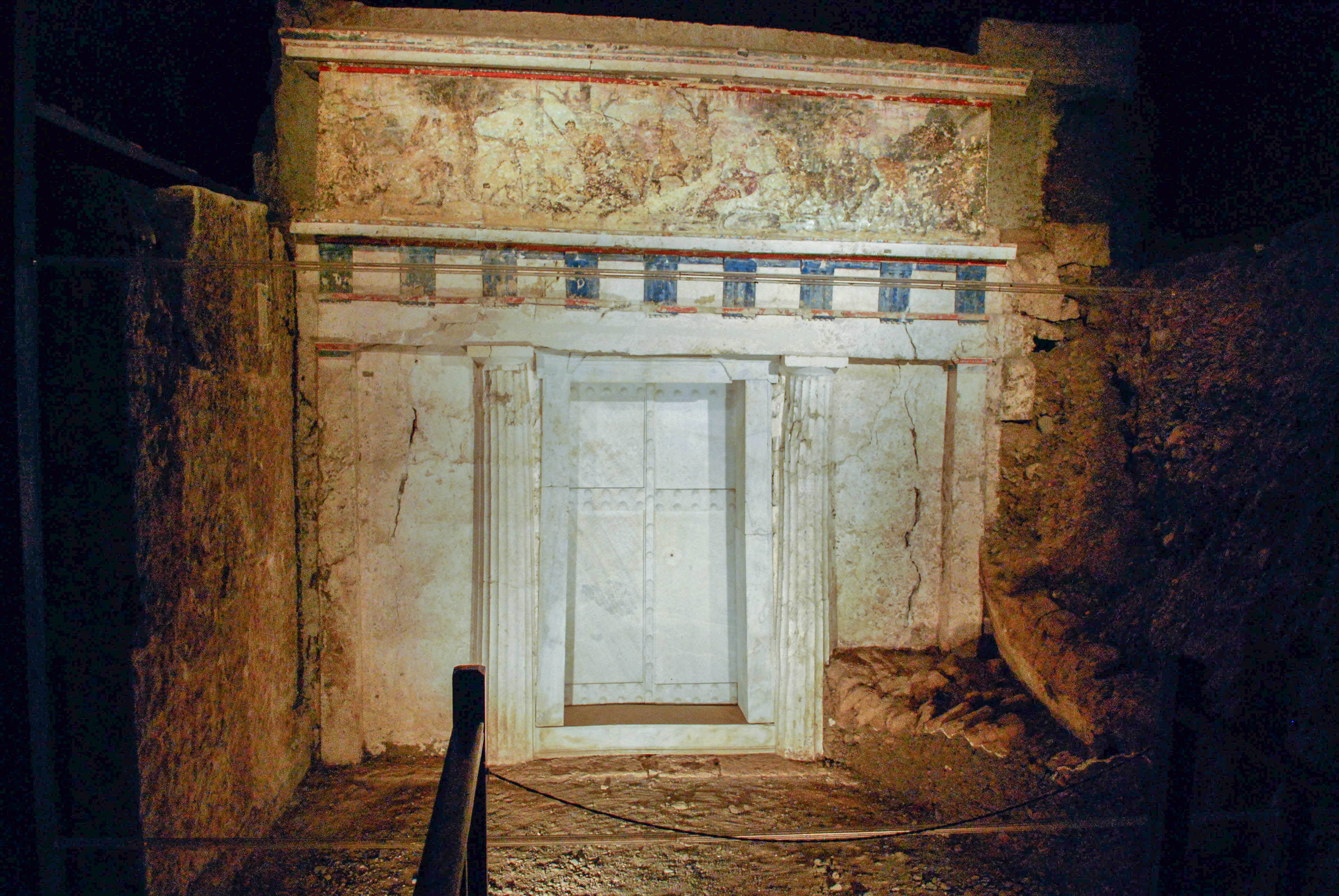
The tomb of Philip II of Macedon at the Museum of the Royal Tombs in Vergina

== Palace of Aigai ==
Palace of Aigai

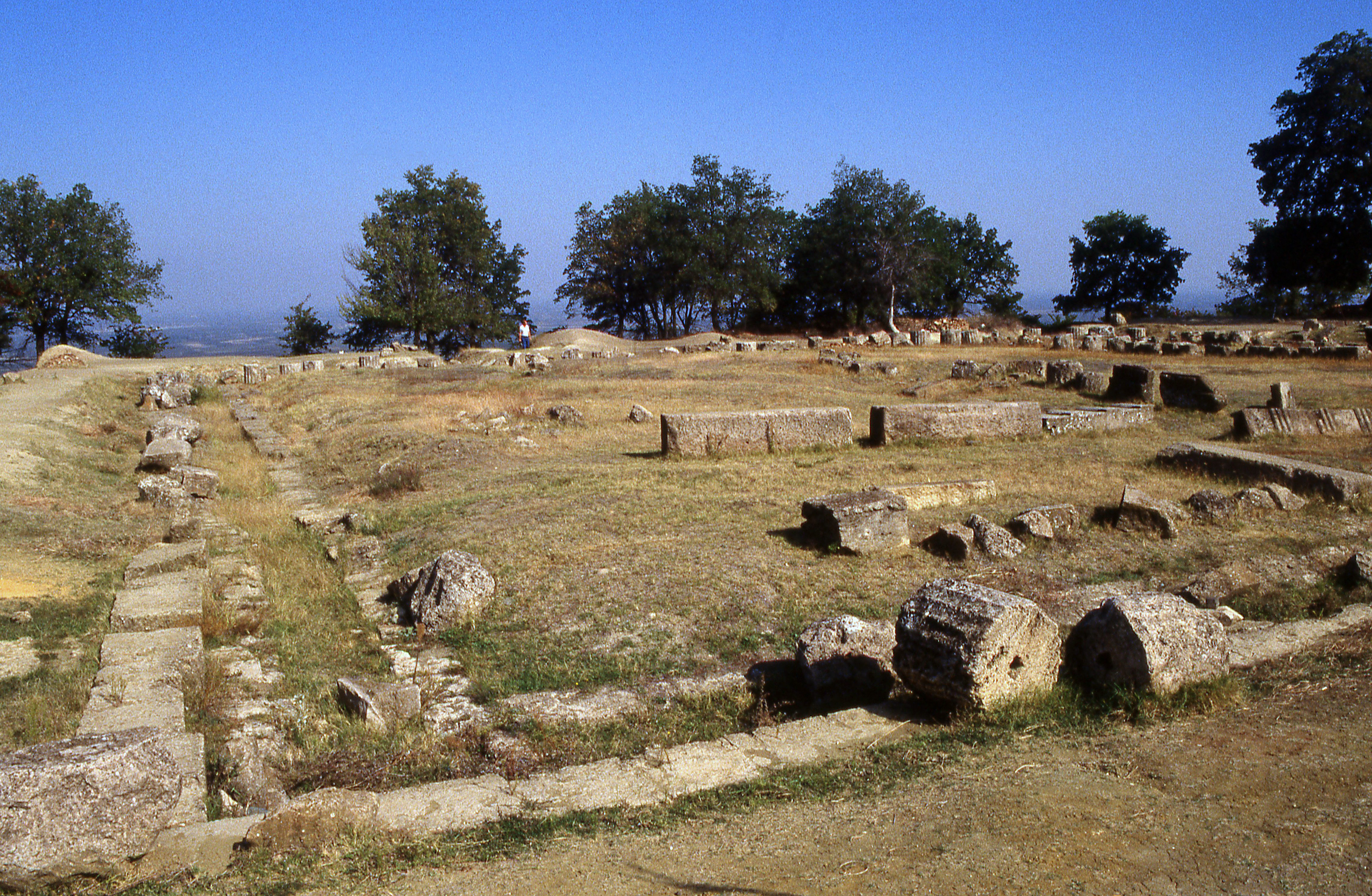
The palace in 1990, before the restoration

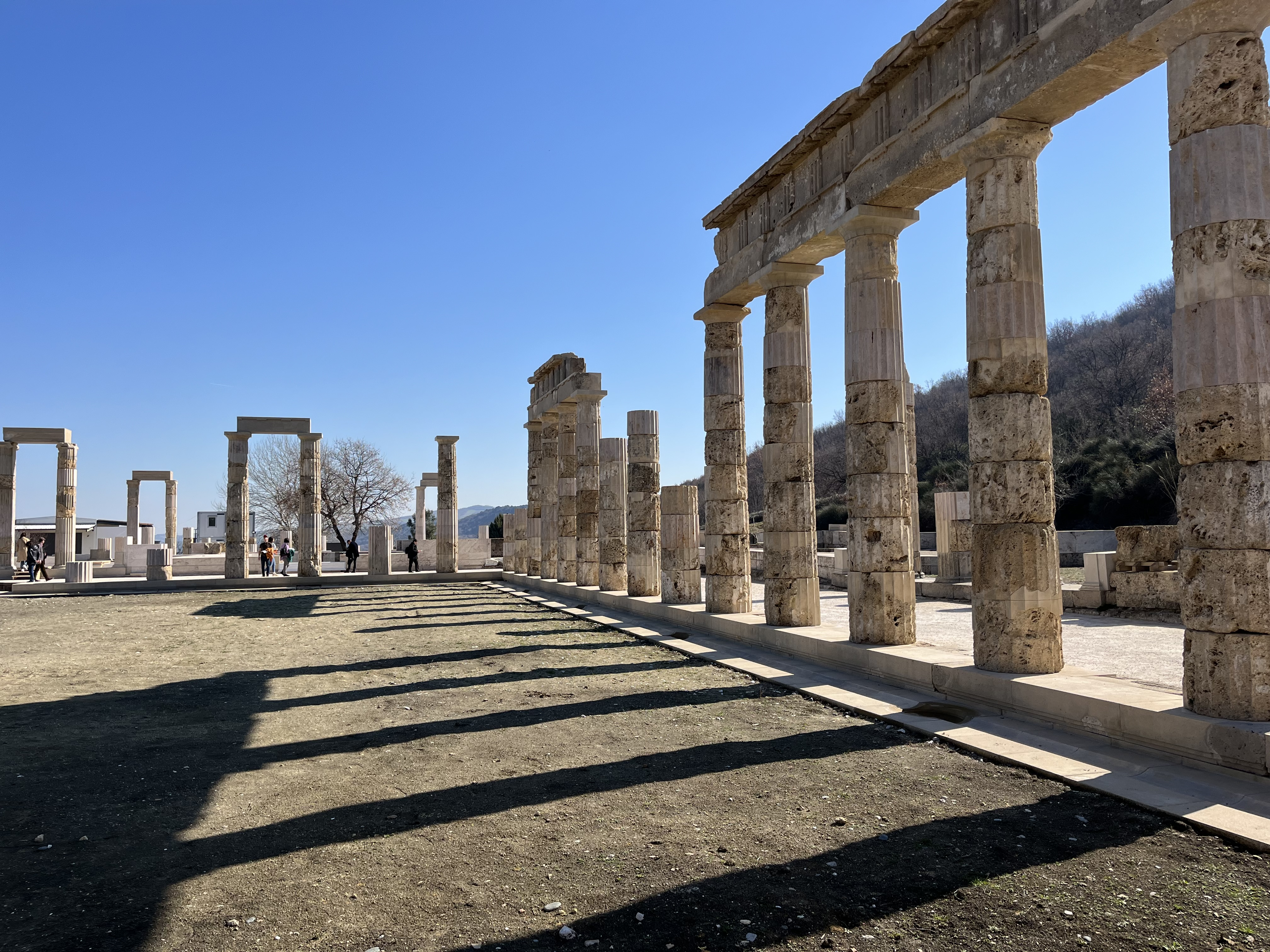
The palace after restoration works in the 2020s

The recently excavated palace is considered to be not only the biggest but, together with the Parthenon, one of the most significant buildings of classical Greece. The most important building discovered is the monumental palace. Located on a plateau directly below the acropolis, this building of two or perhaps three stories is centred on a large open courtyard flanked by Doric colonnades. On the north side was a large gallery with a view of the stage of the neighbouring theatre and the whole Macedonian plain. The palace was sumptuously decorated, with mosaic floors, painted plastered walls, and fine relief tiles. The masonry and architectural members were covered with high-quality marble stucco. Excavations have dated its construction to the reign of Philip II, even though he also had a palace in the capital, Pella. It has been suggested that the building was designed by the architect Pytheos of Priene, known for his work on the Mausoleum at Halicarnassus and for his views on urban planning and architectural proportions. The theatre, also from the second half of the 4th century BC, was closely associated with the palace.

Nearly 30 large columns that surrounded the palace's main peristyle have been reconstructed, some towering to a height of 25 ft. The frieze on the peristyle's southern section has also been reconstructed. Over 5,000 square feet of mosaics depicting a range of scenes, including the ravishing of Europa and motifs from nature have been carefully conserved.

The Palace of Aigai is the largest building of classical Greece and is the location where Alexander the Great was proclaimed king in 336 BC.

The site of the palace lost significance for Macedonian Royalty after it (and the rest of the city) was burned down in 168 BCE after the Battle of Pydna, despite the city remaining for another three centuries. A landslide in the first century AD preserved what was left of the ruins, leaving about 3–4 m of soil on top of the monument.

The Palace of Aigai reopened to the public in January 2024 after an extensive 16-year restoration project.

== See also ==
- List of ancient Greek cities
- Ancient Macedonian dialect
- Thessaloniki
- Acropolis of Athens
- Amphipolis
- Dion, Pieria

== Sources ==
- Fox, Robin J. Lane, ed. (2011). Brill's Companion to Ancient Macedon – Studies in the Archaeology and History of Macedon, 650 BC–300 AD (PDF). Leiden: Brill. ISBN 9789004206502. Archived from the original (PDF) on 7 February 2024.
  - Chatzopoulos, Miltiadis B. "The Cities". In Fox (2011), pp. 235–243.
  - Kottaridi, Angeliki. "The Palace of Aegae". In Fox (2011), pp. 297–334.
- Roisman, Joseph; Worthington, Ian, eds. (2010). A Companion to Ancient Macedonia (PDF) (1 ed.). Chichester: Blackwell Publishing (Wiley). doi:10.1002/9781444327519. ISBN 978-1-4051-7936-2 – via the Internet Archive.
