= Golden Larnax =

Ancient closed coffin

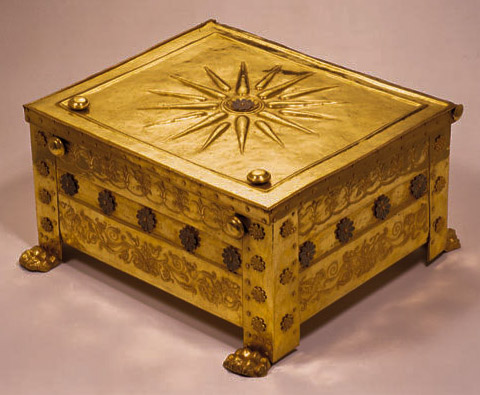
- The Golden Larnax of Philip II of Macedon (Vergina Collection, National Archaeological Museum of Thessaloniki)
- Created: 4th century BC
- Discovered: 1977-1978; Vergina, Central Macedonia, Greece

The Golden Larnax is a 4th-century BC closed coffin discovered in the Macedonian Royal tombs at Vergina in Greece. It has been proposed that it contained the remains of King Philip II of Macedon.

== Discovery and identification ==
In 1977/8, archaeologist Manolis Andronikos led excavations of burial mounds at the small Central Macedonian town of Vergina in Greece. There, by the perimeter of a large mound, the Great Tumulus, he unearthed three tombs. The tombs were subsequently identified as royal burial sites for members of the late 4th-century BC Argead dynasty, the family of Alexander the Great.

Of the three tombs, the first—Tomb I—suffered looting, leaving little more by the time of its discovery than the well known wall painting depicting the Abduction of Persephone by Hades and the buried fragments of human remains. Tombs II and III, however, remained undisturbed, still containing many artifacts. Among them were two gold ash coffins (larnakes) in Tomb II and a silver funerary urn in Tomb III.

The coffin of Tomb II's primary occupant, the Golden Larnax, featured the sixteen-rayed sun design and that of the occupant's wife, entombed in the antechamber, a twelve-ray sun. Andronikos variously described the symbol as a "star", "starburst", and "sunburst". He posited the tomb might belong to King Philip II of Macedon, father of Alexander the Great.

Following the discovery at the Great Tumulus, there was much debate over who had been buried there, especially in Tomb II. It dated to the later half of the 4th century BC, making its royal occupants contemporaneous with Alexander the Great. As Alexander himself had been buried in Egypt, the only remaining plausible Argead men and their wives likely to be buried in Tomb II were Philip II and his last wife Cleopatra Eurydice, or Alexander's half-brother Philip III Arrhidaeus and Eurydice II.

On 21 April 2000, the AAAS journal Science published "The Eye Injury of King Philip II and the Skeletal Evidence from the Royal Tomb II at Vergina", by Antonis Bartsiokas. In it, Bartsiokas cited osteological analyses to contradict the determination of Philip II as the tomb's occupant and made a case for Philip III. However, a good deal of evidence still contradicts Bartsiokas' claims.

During 1992 and 1993, the Great Tumulus was rebuilt.
