= Sanctuary of the Mother of Gods and Aphrodite =

Ancient shrine in Pella, Macedonia

Coordinates: 40.7575°N 22.5191°E

The Sanctuary of the Mother of Gods and Aphrodite was a sanctuary in ancient Pella dedicated to the goddess Aphrodite and the Mother of the Gods (Cybele). It was a Panhellenic sanctuary and a place of pilgrimage from all over Greece.

The temple was situated in the middle of the east-west axis north of the commercial and administrative center of the city. The sanctuary was founded at the end of 4th century BC, and reorganised and rebuilt in the 3rd century BC. The temple was destroyed by an earthquake in the early 1st century.

The sanctuary was dedicated to both Aphrodite and Cybele, who were worshipped here in parallel. There was a local correlation of Aphrodite-Cybele, which was mentioned by Hipponax and Photius. Inscriptions and votive offerings found at the site have testified to the parallel worship.

Excavations were first carried out in 1957.
