= Pella =

Capital of the ancient kingdom of Macedon

- Πέλλα (Ancient Greek)
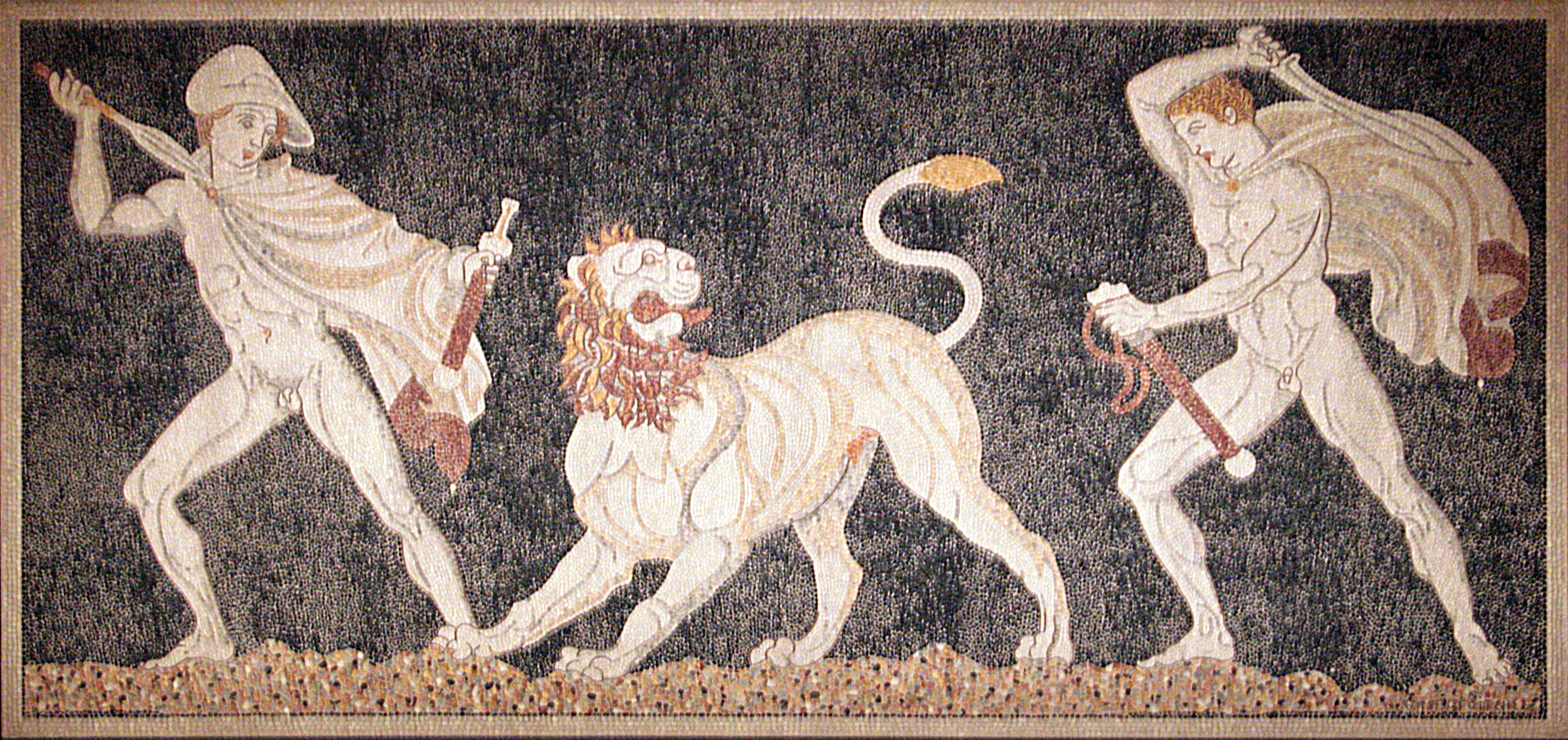
- Lion hunt mosaic

- Location within Greece Location within Europe Pella (Europe)
- 40.754669°N 22.521050°E
- Cultures: Ancient Greece
- Location: Pella, Central Macedonia, Greece
- Part of: Kingdom of Macedon

Site notes
- Architectural style: Ancient Greek

Pella (Ancient Greek: Πέλλα) was the capital of the ancient Greek kingdom of Macedon from the 4th century BC up until the Roman conquest in 168 BC. Pella was the birthplace of Philip II in 382 BC, and his son Alexander the Great in 356 BC. It is located 1 km outside the modern town of Pella in Central Macedonia, Greece.

Pella was probably founded at the beginning of the 4th century BC by Archelaus I as the new capital of Macedon, supplanting Aigai, which still remained the burial place for the kings and the royal family. Pella quickly became the largest and richest city in Macedonia and flourished particularly under the rule of Cassander and Antigonus II.

In 168 BC, the city was sacked by the Romans during the Third Macedonian War and entered a long period of decline, its importance eclipsed by that of the nearby Thessalonica, which became the capital of the Roman province of Macedonia.

== Etymology ==
The name is probably derived from the word pella, (Ancient Greek: πέλλα), "stone" which seems to appear in some other toponyms in Greece like Pellene. Julius Pokorny reconstructs the word from the Proto-Indo-European root peli-s, pel-s, Vedic Sanskrit: pāsāna, stone (from *pars, *pels), Greek: πέλλα, λίθος, stone, Hesychius (*pelsa), Pashto: parša (*plso), cliff, Germanic : *falisa, German: Fels, Old Norse: fell (*pelso), Illyrian: *pella, *palla. Solders in an essay on Hesychius glossary has referenced πέλλα (pella), λίθος (stone) as an ancient Macedonian word. With the prefix "α" it forms the word ἀπέλλα, apella, "fence, enclosure of stones". Robert Beekes relates the word πέλλα with the name of the city, but suggests that it probably has pre-Greek origin.

== History ==
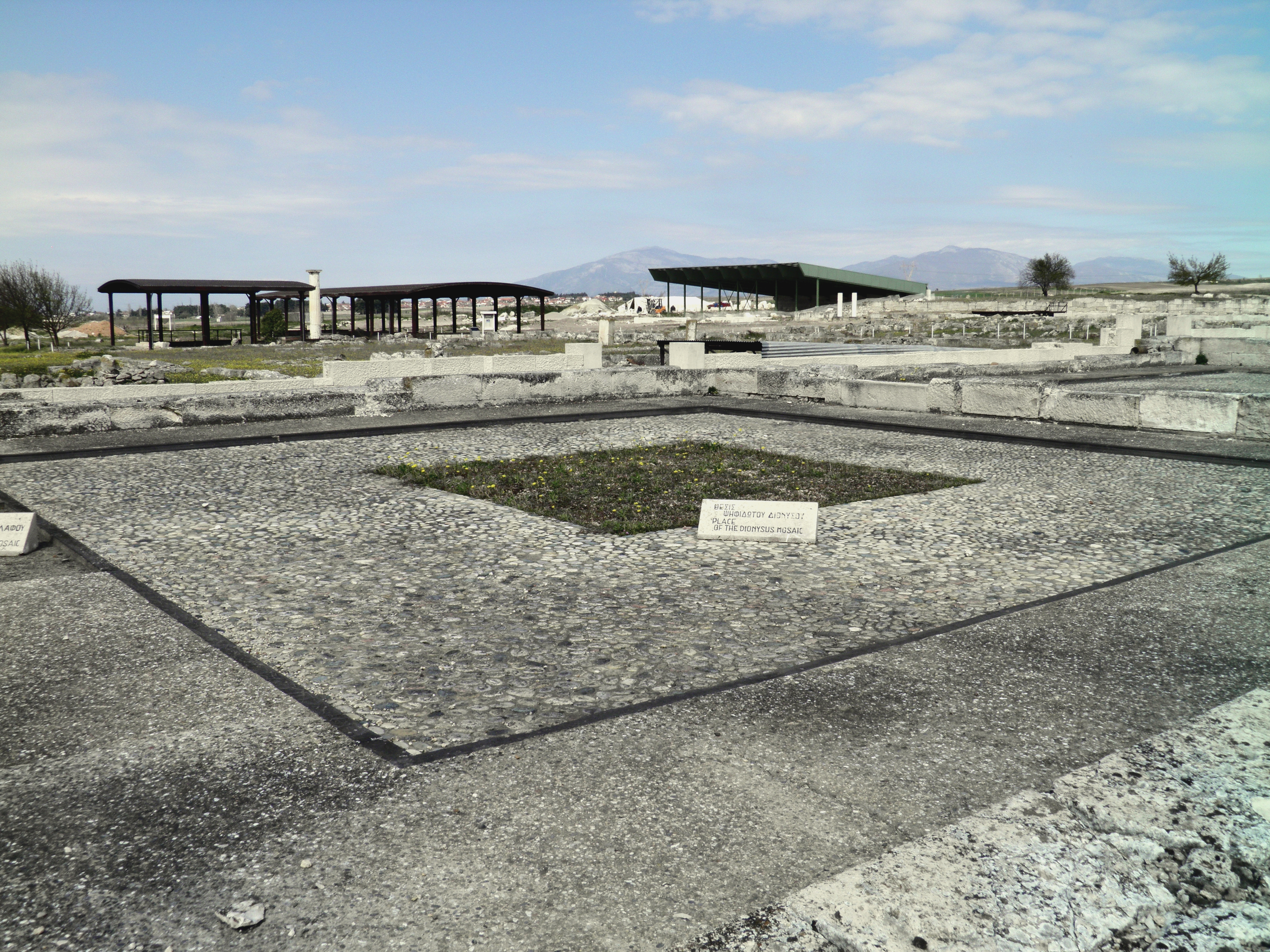
House of Dionysus (325–300 BC).

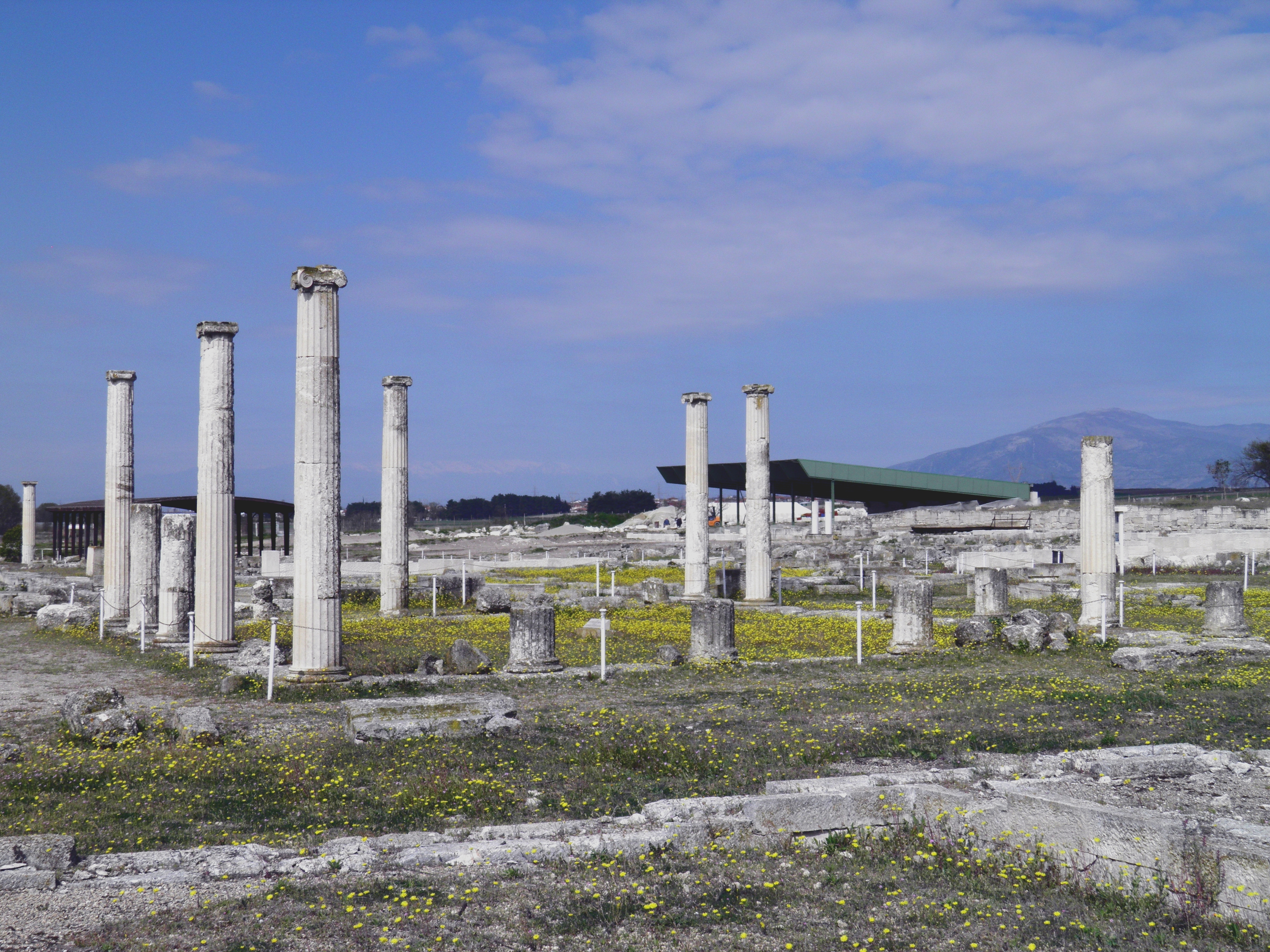
The main courtyard of the House of Dionysos.

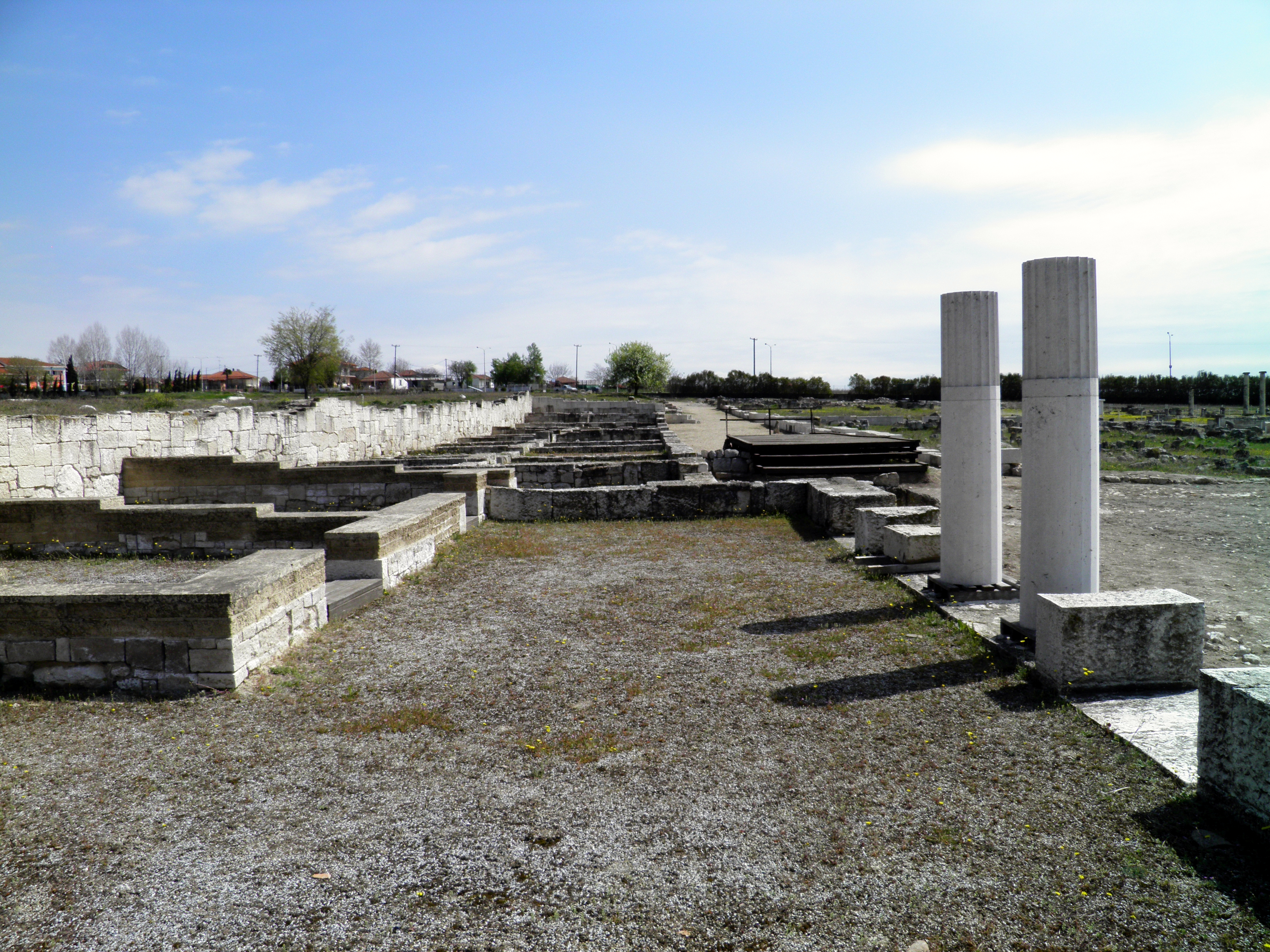
Shops along the eastern edge of the agora.

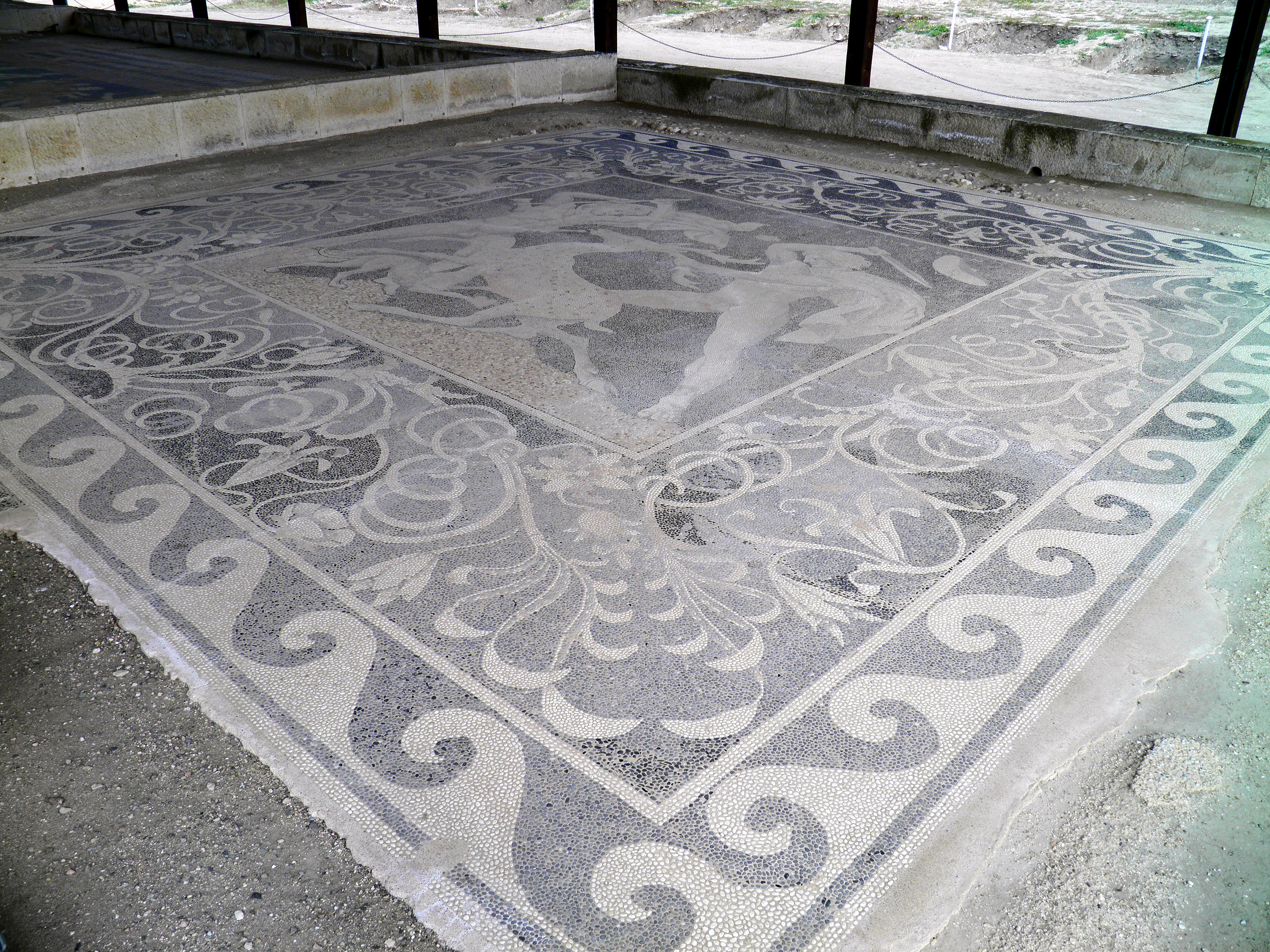
Stag Hunt Mosaic from the House of the Abduction of Helen.

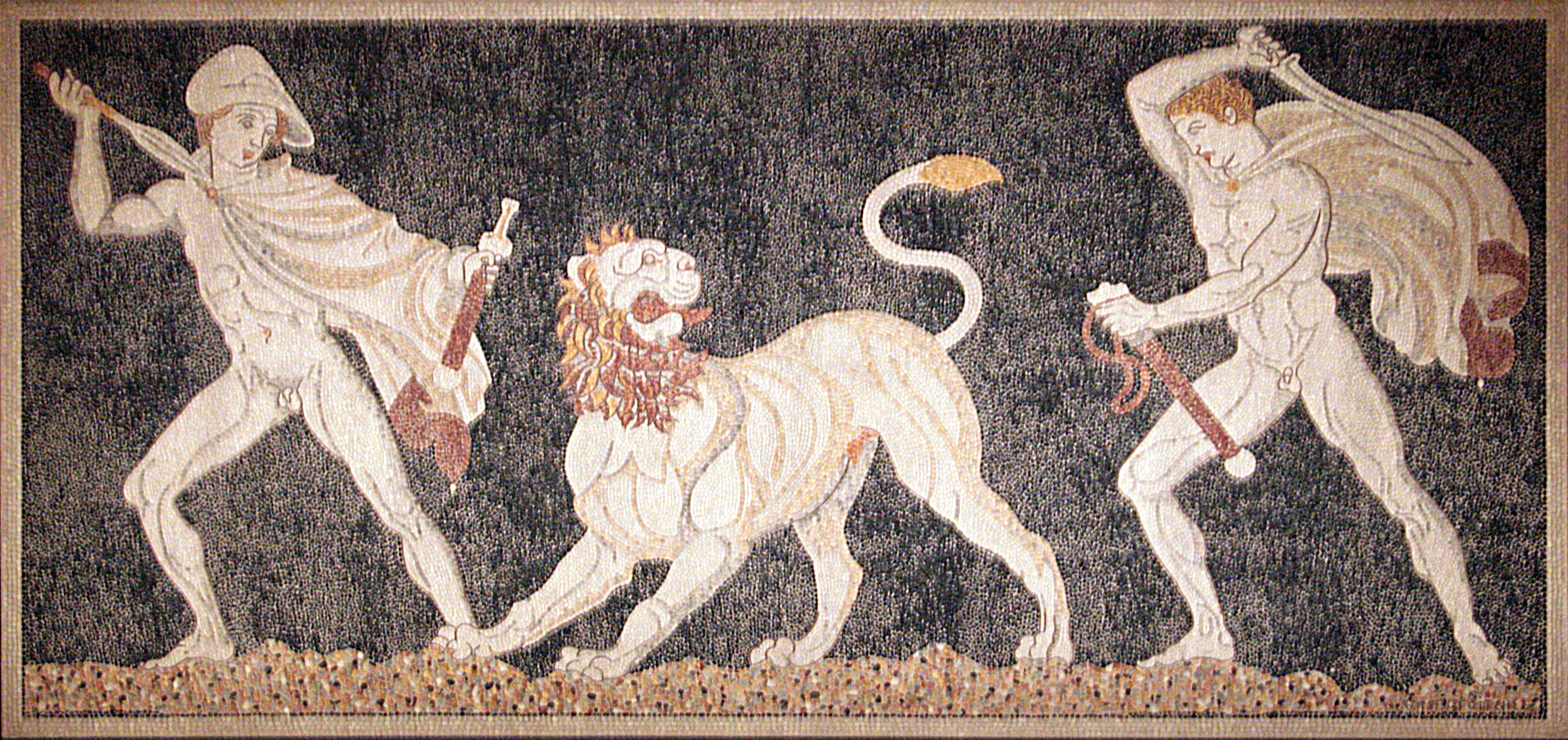
Lion hunt mosaic

In antiquity, Pella was a strategic port in Lower Macedonia, connected to the Thermaic Gulf by a navigable inlet, but the harbour and gulf have since silted up, leaving the site inland. Pella is first mentioned in relation to Xerxes' campaign and in relation to Macedonian expansion and the war against Sitalces, the king of the Thracians. It was probably built as the commercial capital of the kingdom of Macedon by Archelaus I, complementing the older palace-city of Aigai although there appears to be some possibility that it may have been created by Amyntas III.

Archelaus invited the painter Zeuxis, the greatest painter of the time, to decorate his palace. He also later hosted the poet Timotheus of Miletus and the Athenian playwright Euripides who finished his days there writing and producing Archelaus. Euripides' Bacchae was first staged here, about 408 BC. According to Xenophon, in the beginning of the 4th century BC Pella was the largest Macedonian city. It was the birthplace and seats of Philip II, in 382 BC and of Alexander the Great, his son, in 356 BC. It was already a walled city in the time of Philip II and he made the city of great international importance.

It became the largest and richest city in Macedonia and flourished particularly under Cassander's rule who redesigned and expanded it. The reign of Antigonus most likely represented the height of the city's prosperity, as this is the period which has left the most archaeological remains. The famous poet Aratus died in Pella c. 240 BC.

Pella is further mentioned by Polybius and Livy as the capital of Philip V and of Perseus during the Macedonian Wars fought against the Roman Republic.

In 168 BC, it was sacked by the Romans, and its treasury transported to Rome. Livy reported how the city looked in 167 BC to Lucius Aemilius Paulus Macedonicus, the Roman who defeated Perseus at the Battle of Pydna:

...[Paulus] observed that it was not without good reason that it had been chosen as the royal residence. It is situated on the south-west slope of a hill and surrounded by a marsh too deep to be crossed on foot either in summer or winter. The citadel the "Phacus," which is close to the city, stands in the marsh itself, projecting like an island, and is built on a huge substructure which is strong enough to carry a wall and prevent any damage from the infiltration from the water of the lagoon. At a distance it appears to be continuous with the city wall, but it is really separated by a channel which flows between the two walls and is connected with the city by a bridge. Thus it cuts off all means of access from an external foe, and if the king shut anyone up there, there could be no possibility of escape except by the bridge, which could be very easily guarded.

Pella was declared capital of the 3rd administrative division of the Roman province of Macedonia, and was possibly the seat of the Roman governor. Activity continued to be vigorous until the early 1st century BC and, crossed by the Via Egnatia, Pella remained a significant point on the route between Dyrrachium and Thessalonica.

In about 90 BC the city was destroyed by an earthquake; shops and workshops dating from the catastrophe have been found with remains of their merchandise, though the city was eventually rebuilt over its ruins. Cicero stayed there in 58 BC, though by then the provincial seat had already transferred to Thessalonica

Pella was promoted to a Roman Colony sometime between 45 and 30 BC and its currency was marked Colonia Iulia Augusta Pella. Augustus settled peasants there whose land he had usurped to give to his veterans. But, unlike other Macedonian colonies such as Philippi, Dion, and Cassandreia, it never came under the jurisdiction of ius Italicum or Roman law. Four pairs of colonial magistrates (duumvirs quinquennales) are known for this period.

The ruin of the city is described by Dio Chrysostom and Lucian though their accounts may be exaggerated, as the Roman city occupied the west of the original capital and coinage indicates prosperity.

Despite its decline, archaeology has shown that the southern part of the city near the lagoon continued to be occupied until the 4th century.

In about AD 180, Lucian of Samosata could describe it in passing as "now insignificant, with very few inhabitants". It later temporarily bore the name Diocletianopolis. In the Byzantine period, the Roman site was occupied by a fortified village.

== Ancient Macedonian in Pella curse tablet ==
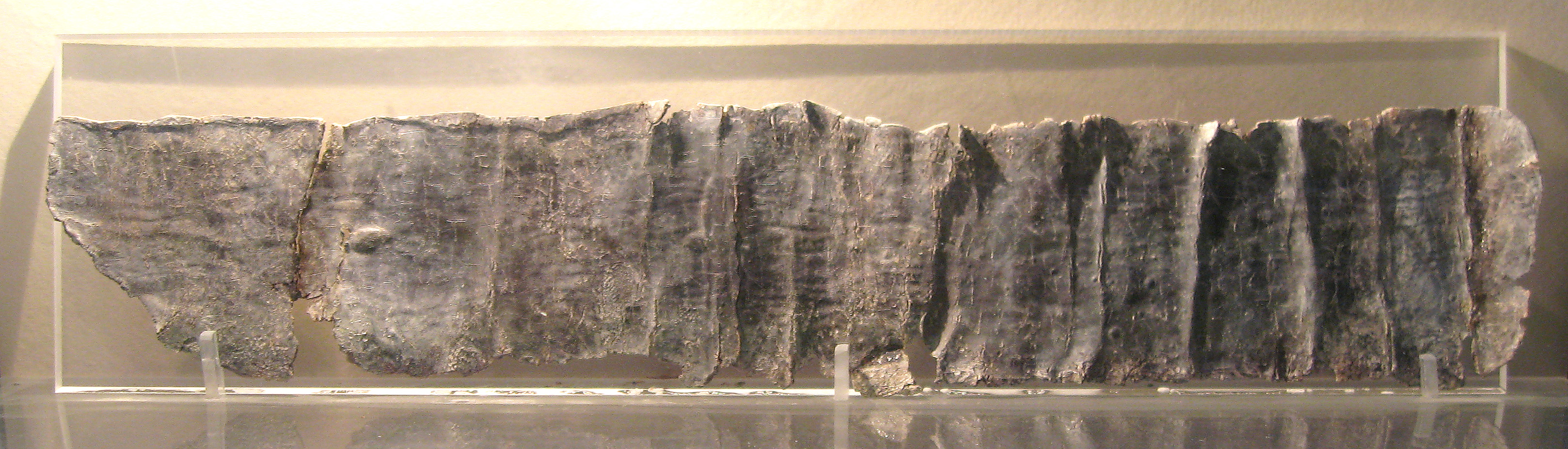
The Pella curse tablet at the Archaeological Museum of Pella

The discovery of the Pella curse tablet in 1986, found in Pella, has a text written in a distinct Doric Greek idiom. Ιt contains a curse (Greek: κατάδεσμος, katadesmos) inscribed on a lead scroll, dated to c. 375–350 BC. It was published in the Hellenic Dialectology Journal in 1993 and is one of four texts found that might represent a local dialectal form of ancient Greek in Macedonia, all identifiable as Doric. These confirm that a Doric Greek dialect was spoken in Macedonia, as was expected from the West Greek forms of names found in Macedonia. As a result, the curse tablet has been put forward as a strong argument that Ancient Macedonian was a dialect of North-Western Greek, part of the Doric dialects. The Pella curse tablet exhibits some of the typical Northwest Greek features, as well as a cluster of unique Doric features that do not appear in other subdialects of this family (e.g. Epirote, Locrian). It represents the same or a very similar vernacular dialect that is also attested in the other Doric inscriptions from Macedonia. This indicates that a Doric Greek dialect was not imported, but proper to Macedon. As a result, the Pella curse tablet has been forwarded as an argument that Ancient Macedonian was a variety of Northwest Greek, and one of the Doric dialects.

== Archaeology ==
Excavations there by the Greek Archaeological Service begun in 1957 revealed large, well-built houses with colonnaded courts and rooms with mosaic floors portraying such scenes as a lion hunt and Dionysus riding a panther.

The site was explored by 19th-century voyagers including Holand, François Pouqueville, Félix de Beaujour, Cousinéry, Delacoulonche, Hahn, Gustave Glotz and Struck, based on the descriptions provided by Titus Livius. The first excavation was begun by G. Oikonomos in 1914–15. The modern systematic exploration of the site began in 1953 and work has continued since then uncovering significant parts of the extensive city.

In February 2006, a farmer accidentally uncovered the largest tomb ever found in Greece. The names of the noble ancient Macedonian family are still on inscriptions and painted sculptures and walls have survived. The tomb dates to the 2nd or 3rd century BC. Overall, archaeologists have uncovered 1,000 tombs at Pella since 2000, but these only represent an estimated 5% of those at the site. In 2009 43 graves containing rich and elaborate grave goods were found and in 2010 37 tombs dating from 650 to 280 BC were discovered containing rich ancient Macedonian artifacts ranging from ceramics to precious metals. One of the tombs was the final resting place of a warrior from the 6th century BC with a bronze helmet with a gold mouthplate, weapons and jewellery.

Since 2011, much of the Palace of Pella has been excavated and from 2017 parts of it have been restored. It was opened to the public in December, 2025.

Many artefacts are displayed in the Archaeological Museum of Pella.

=== Hippodamian plan ===
Schematic plan of Pella

The city proper was located south of and below the palace. Designed on a grid plan as envisaged by Hippodamus, it consists of parallel streets which intersect at right angles and form a grid of eight rows of rectangular blocks. The blocks are of a consistent width—each approximately 45 m—and of a length which varies from 111 m to 152 m, 125 metres being the most common. The streets are from 9 to 10 metres wide, except for the middle East–West arterial, which is up to 15 metres wide. This street is the primary access to the central public agora, which occupied a space of ten blocks. Two North-South streets are also a bit wider than the rest, and serve to connect the city to the port further South. This type of plan dates to the first half of the 4th century BC, and is very close to the ideal in design, though it distinguishes itself by large block size; Olynthus in Chalcidice for example had blocks of 86.3×35 metres. On the other hand, later Hellenistic urban foundations have blocks comparable to those of Pella: 112×58 m in Laodicea ad Mare, or 120×46 m in Aleppo.

=== Urban area ===
The city is built on the former island of Phacos, a promontory which dominated the sea to the south in the Hellenistic period. The city wall mentioned by Livy is only partly known. It consists of a rampart of crude bricks (~ 50 cm square) raised on a stone foundation; some of which has been located North of the palace, and some in the South next to the lake. Inside the ramparts, three hills occupy the North.

In pride of place in the centre of the city is the Agora, built in the last quarter of the 4th century BC and an architectural gem, unique in conception and size; it covered ~ 7 hectares or 10 city blocks. Pella is one of the first known cities to have had an extensive piped water supply to individual house and waste water disposal from most of the city.

The agora was surrounded by the shaded colonnades of stoas, and streets of enclosed houses with frescoed walls round inner courtyards. The first trompe-l'œil wall murals imitating perspective views ever seen were on walls at Pella. There were temples to Aphrodite, Cybele and Demeter. Pella's pebble-mosaic floors are famous: some reproduce Greek paintings; one shows a lion-griffin attacking a stag, a familiar motif also of Scythian art, another depicts Dionysus riding a leopard. These mosaics adorned the floors of rich houses, often named after their representations, particularly the Houses of Helen and Dionysus.

== Palace of Pella ==
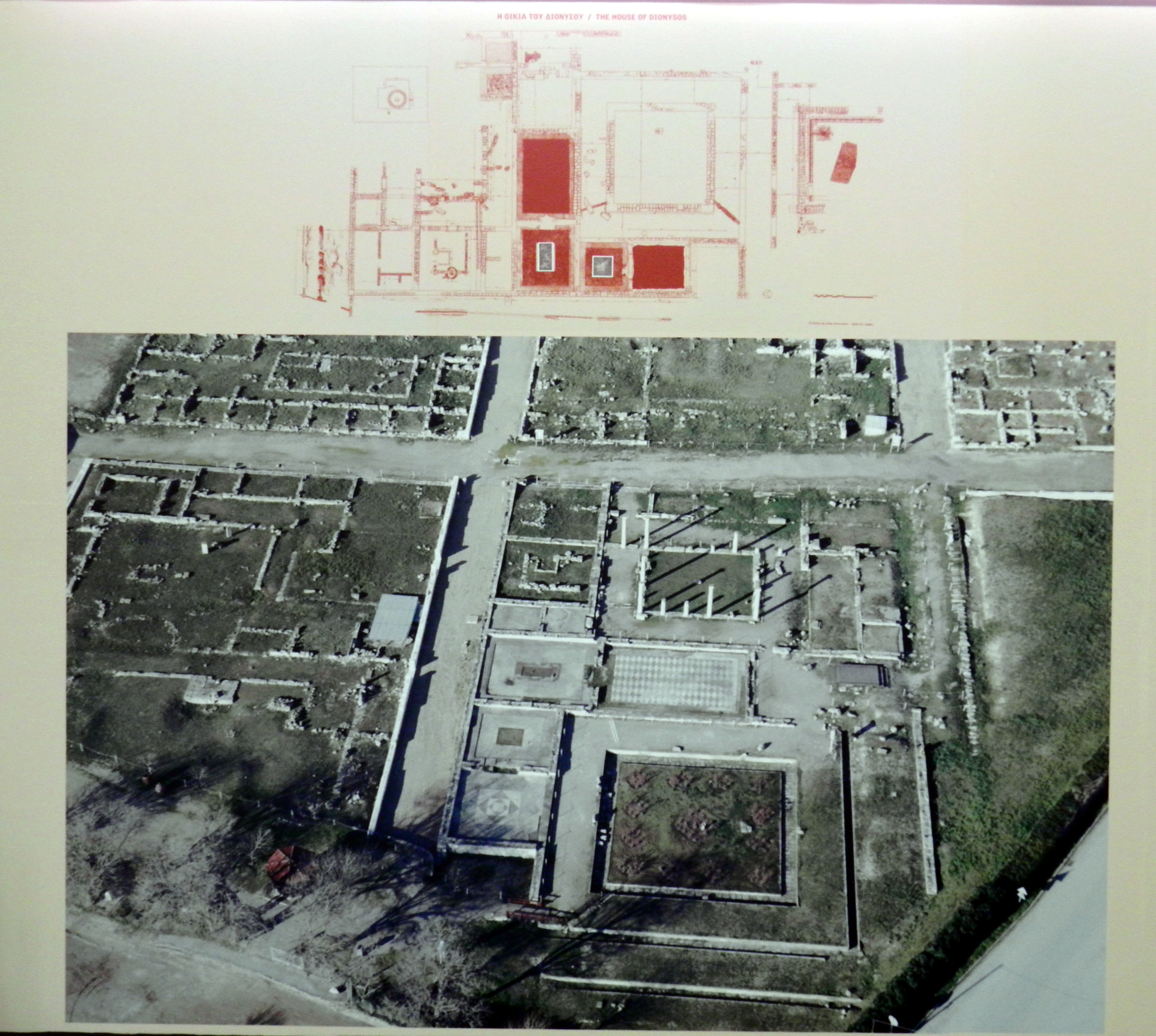
Plan of the House of Dionysos and aerial photo

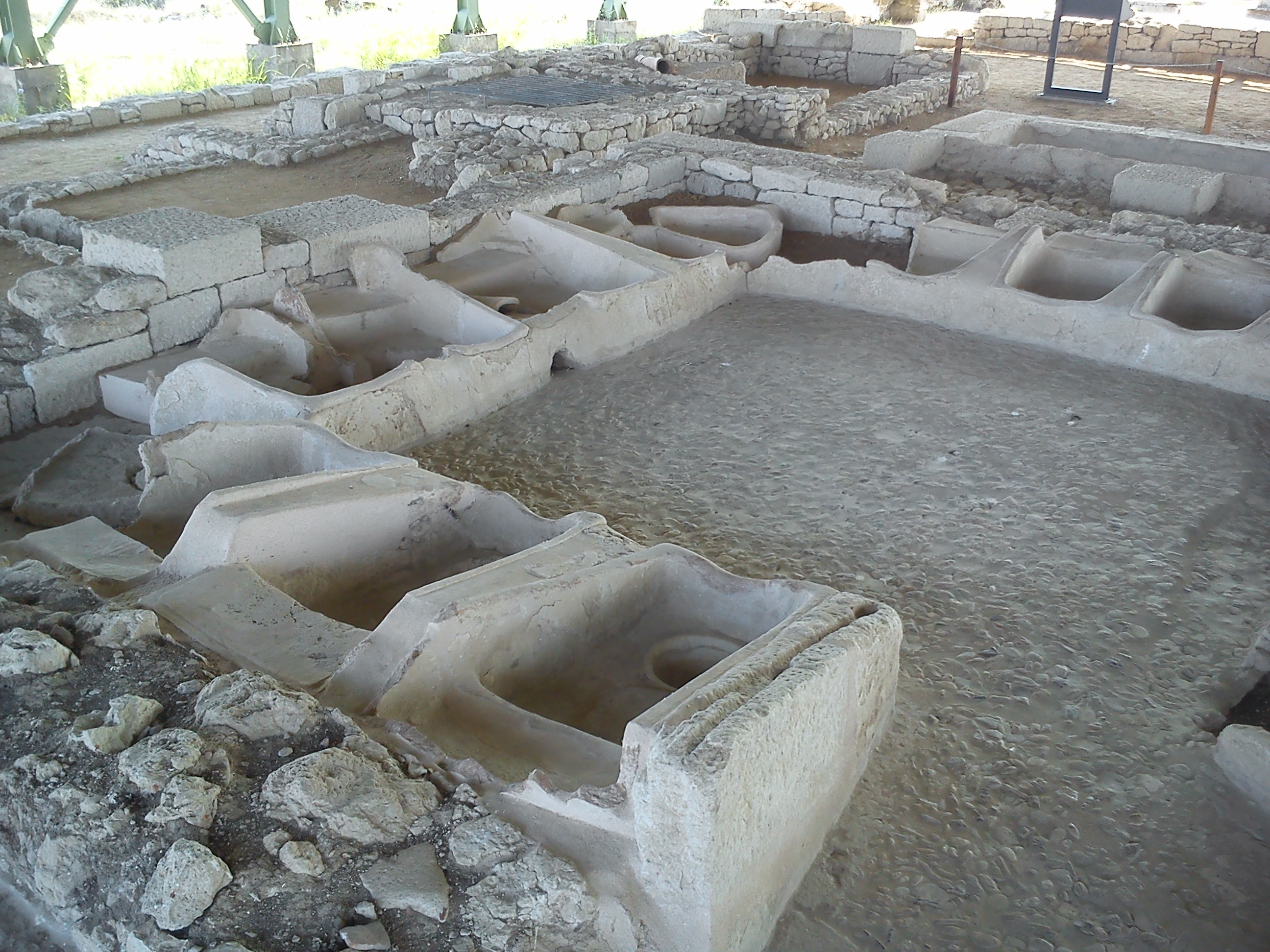
Bathtubs in the public baths

The palace is situated on a 70 m high hill north of the city, a strategic position commanding the entire area and occupying a vast area of 75,000 m^{2}. It consisted of several large architectural groupings on terraces ascending from south-west to north-east, each with a series of rooms around a central courtyard, generally with porticos. The oldest parts date from the time of Philip II, 350-330 BC, and the palace was further developed over time.

The south facade of the palace, towards the city, consisted of one large (at least 153 metres long) portico, constructed on a 2 m-high foundation. The relationship between the four principal complexes is defined by an interruption in the portico occupied by a triple propylaeum, 15 m high, which gave the palace an imposing monumental air when seen from the city below. Archaeologists have identified a palaestra and baths dating from the reign of Cassander.

The size of the complex indicates that, unlike the palace at Aigai, this was not only a royal residence or a grandiose monument but also a place of government which was required to accommodate a significant portion of the administrative apparatus of the kingdom.

== Legacy ==
In modern times Pella is also the starting point of the Alexander The Great Marathon, in honour of the city's ancient heritage.

== See also ==
- List of ancient Greek cities
- Vergina
- Ancient Macedonians
- Sparta
- Athens
- Rome
