= Larnax =

Minoan small closed burial-chest

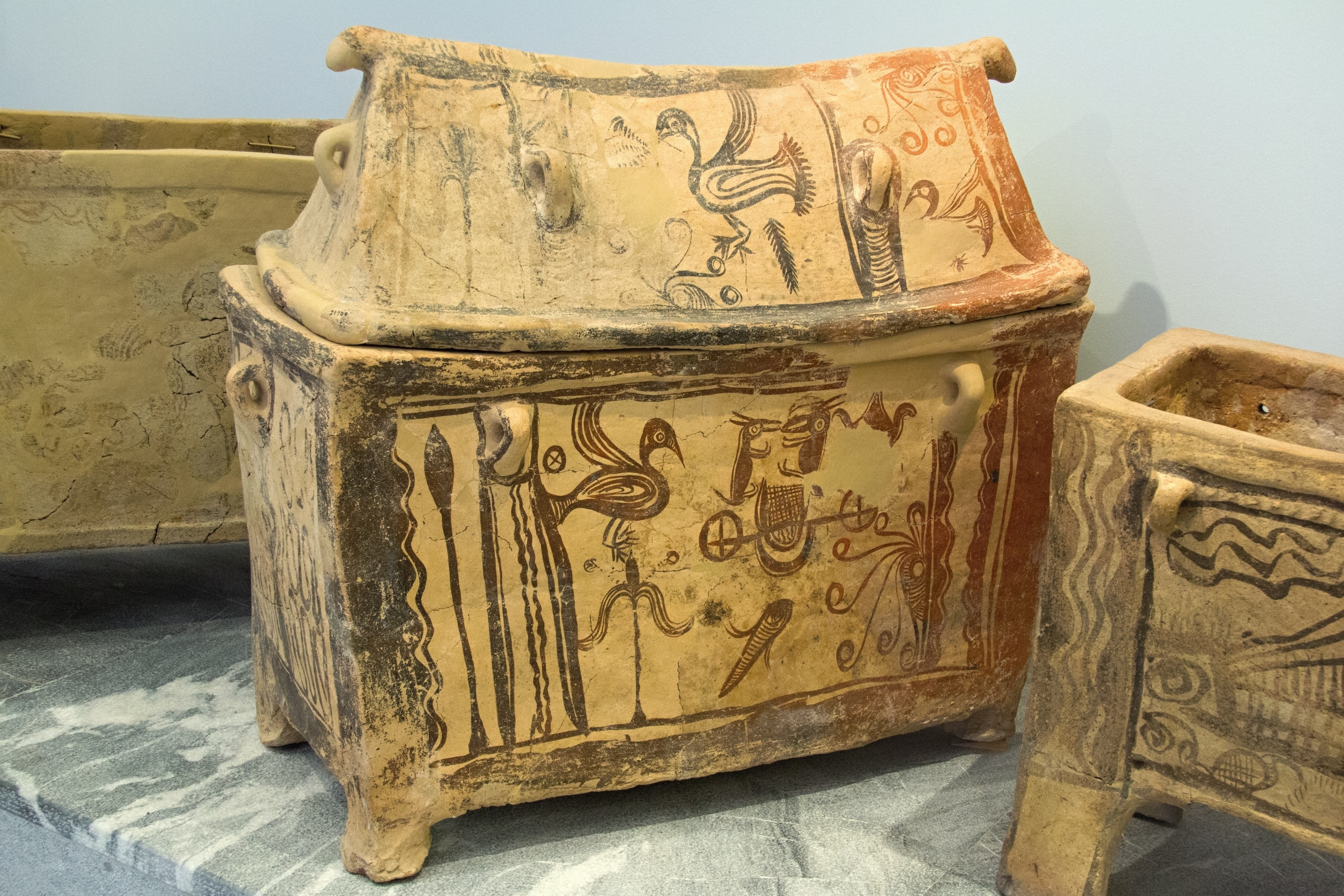
Late Minoan III larnax from Kavrochori, Archaeological Museum of Heraklion

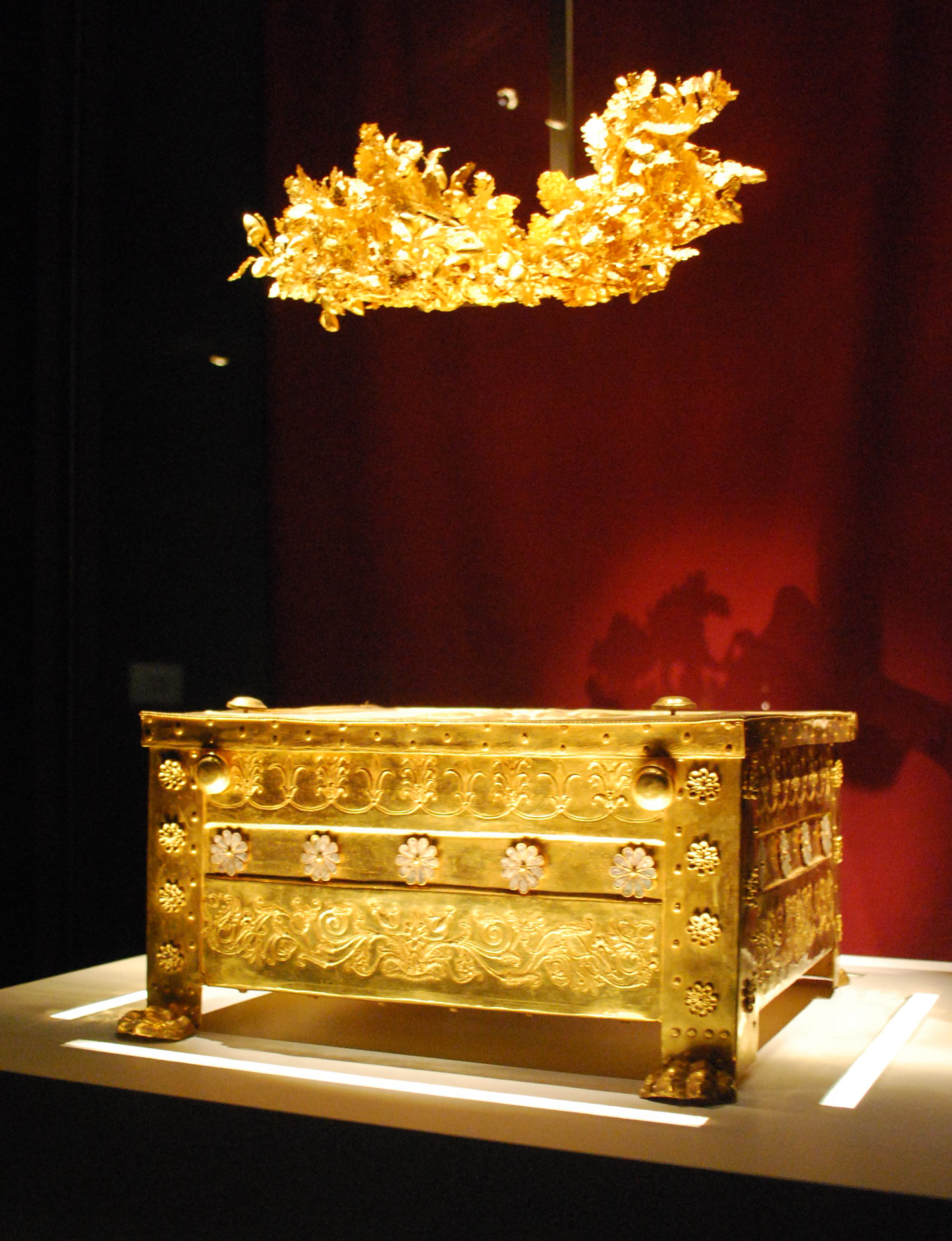
The golden larnax and the golden crown of Philip II of Macedon, Vergina Museum.

A larnax (plural: larnakes; Ancient Greek: λάρναξ, romanized: lárnax, plural: λάρνακες, lárnakes) is a type of small closed coffin, box or "ash-chest" often used in the Minoan civilization and in Ancient Greece as a container for human remains—either a corpse (bent back on itself) or cremated ashes.

The first larnakes appeared in the Minoan period of the Aegean civilization, when they took the form of ceramic coffers designed to imitate wooden chests, perhaps on the pattern of Egyptian linen chests. They were richly decorated with abstract patterns, octopuses and scenes of hunting and cult rituals.

During the later Hellenistic period, larnakes, in the form of small terracotta sarcophagi, became popular, some of which were painted in similar styles to contemporary Greek vases.

In a few special cases, larnakes appear to have been made out of precious materials, as in the 4th century BC example found at Vergina in Macedonia, of gold, with a sun motif (hence known as the "Vergina Sun" motif) on the lid. Manolis Andronikos, the leader of the archaeological excavation, posited that the larnax most likely contained the remains of King Philip II of Macedon, father of Alexander the Great.
