= Manolis Andronikos =

Greek archaeologist and academic (1919–1992)

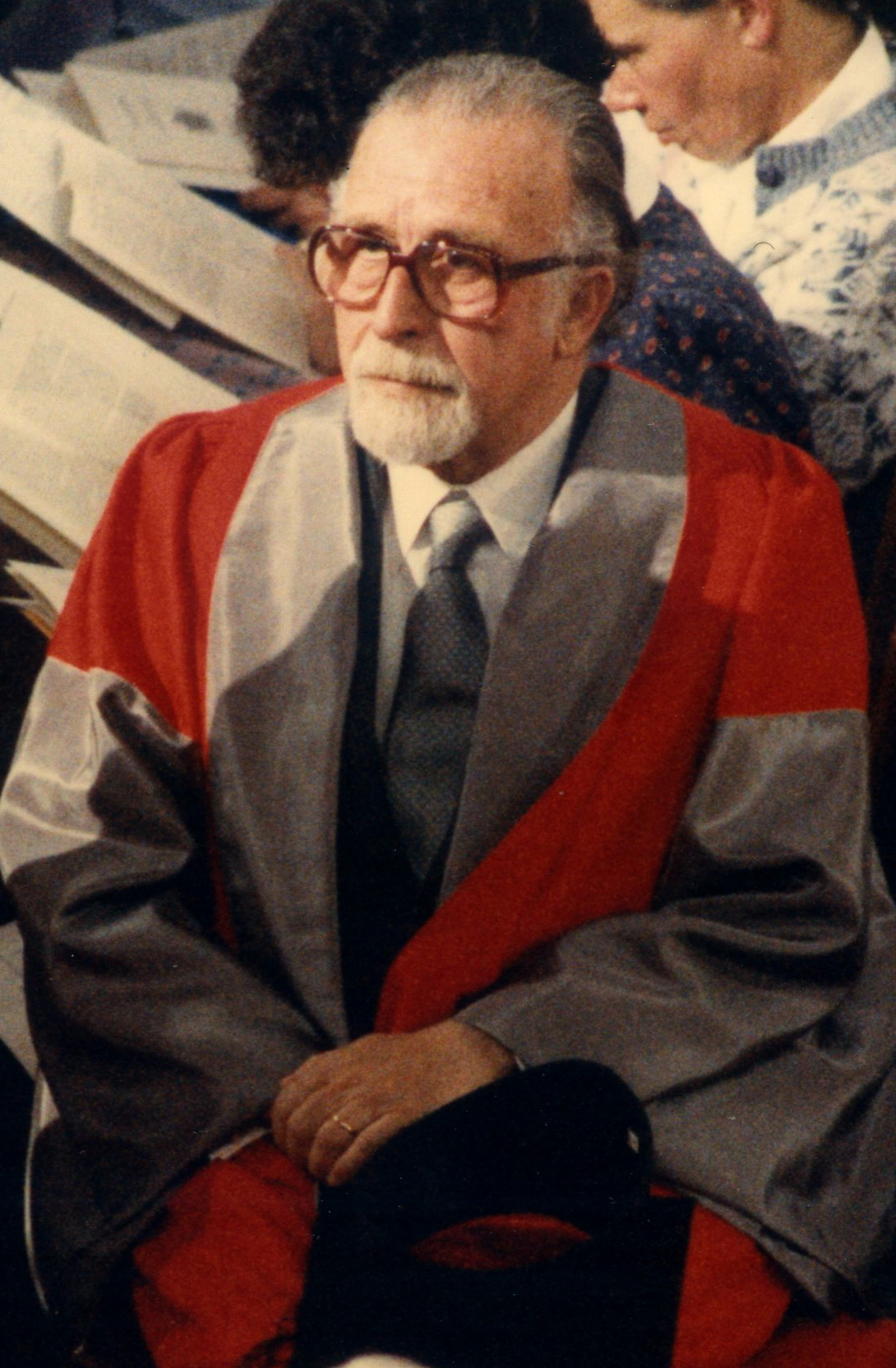
- Andronikos in 1986
- Born: October 23, 1919; Bursa, Ottoman Empire
- Died: March 30, 1992 (aged 72); Thessaloniki, Central Macedonia, Greece
- Education: University of Thessaloniki; Oxford University
- Known for: Discovering the tomb of Philip II of Macedon
- Scientific career
- Fields: Archaeology
- Workplaces: Aristotle University of Thessaloniki

Manolis Andronikos (Greek: Μανόλης Ανδρόνικος) (October 23, 1919 – March 30, 1992) was a Greek archaeologist and a professor at the Aristotle University of Thessaloniki.

== Biography ==
Andronikos was born on October 23, 1919, at Bursa (Greek: Προύσα). His father originated from the island of Samos, while his mother was from Imbros. Later, his family moved to Thessaloniki.

He studied philosophy at the Aristotle University of Thessaloniki and in 1952 became a professor of Classical Archeology at the Aristotle University of Thessaloniki. Later he continued his studies at Oxford University with professor Sir John D. Beazley from 1954–1955. He came back to the Aristotle University of Thessaloniki in 1957 where he taught Archeology first as instructor and later (1964) as professor.

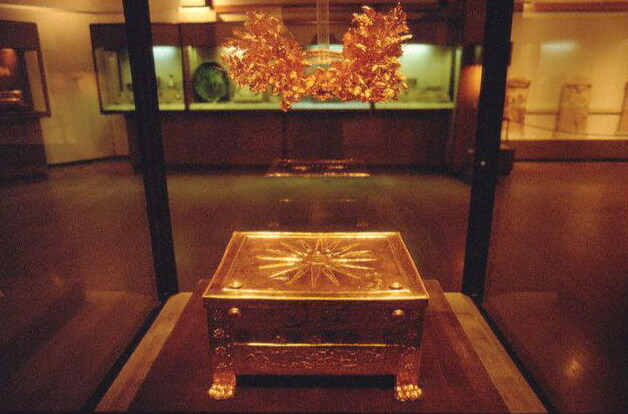
The Golden Larnax (since 1997 at the Archaeological Museum of Vergina; here at the Archaeological Museum of Thessaloniki) that contained the remains of King Philip II.

He was married to the school teacher Olympia Kakoulidou and loved reading poetry, especially Kostis Palamas, Giorgos Seferis, and Odysseas Elytis. He was the founder of a local cultural group named Art (Greek: Η τέχνη).

Manolis Andronikos conducted archaeological research in Veroia, Naousa, Kilkis, Chalkidiki, and Thessaloniki, but his main research was done in Vergina, where his teacher, professor K. Rhomaios had founded in 1937 the Aristotle University Excavation at Vergina. His greatest discovery occurred on November 8, 1977, when he found a tomb at Vergina which he identified as that of Philip II of Macedon. It was unplundered and contained many valuable items, such as a golden larnax. The finds from this tomb were later included in the travelling exhibit "The Search for Alexander" displayed at four cities in the United States from 1980 to 1982. While the discovery is of great archaeological importance, the identification of the tomb with Philip has been disputed by some archaeologists; that said, if the tomb is not Philip's, one of the others in the same complex probably is.

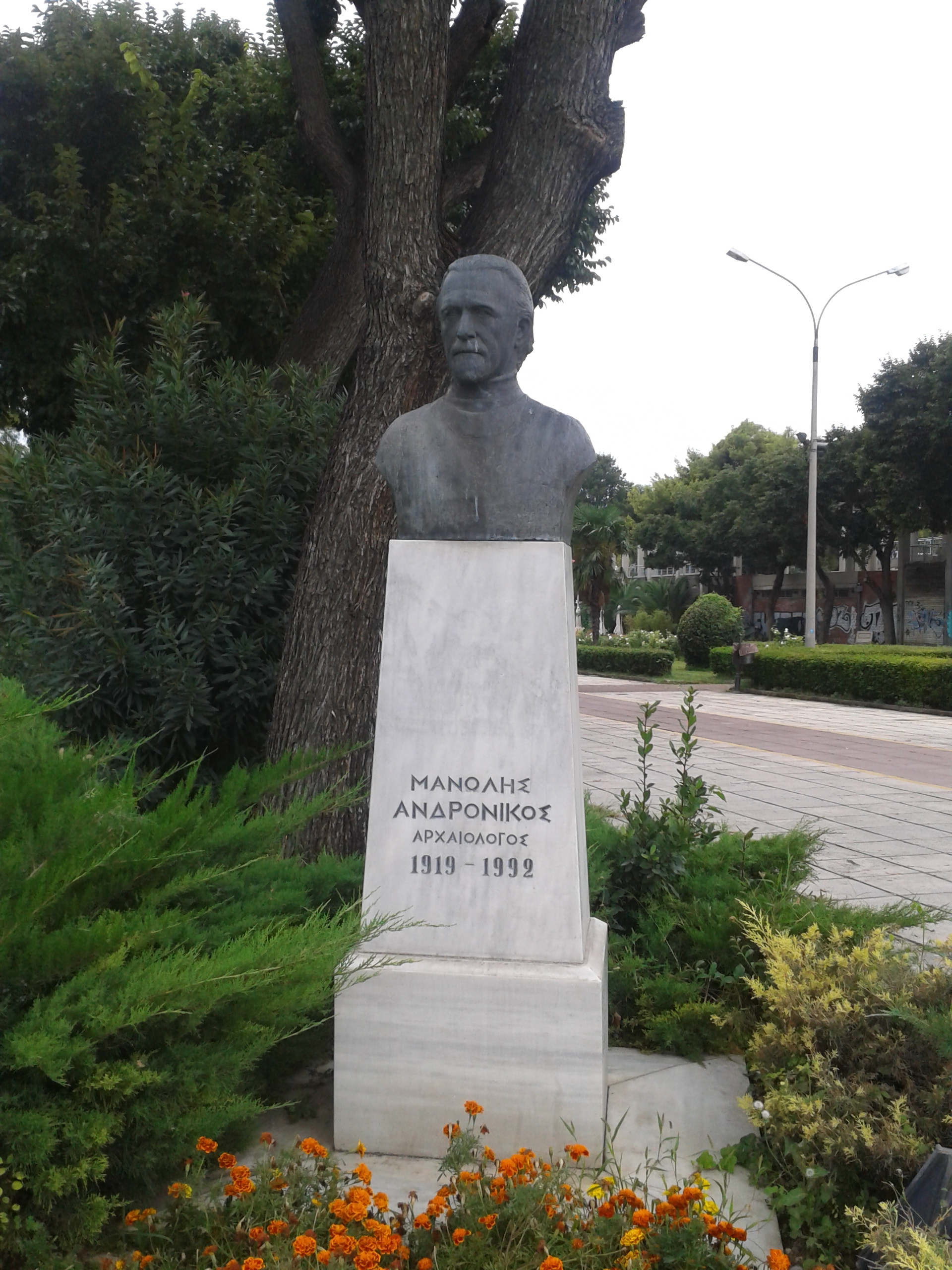
A bust of Andronikos in Thessaloniki

Andronikos was a member of the Central Archaeological Council (1964–1965), the Athens Archaeological Society, the Macedonian Studies Association, the Association Internationale des Critiques d' Art and the German Archaeological Institute at Berlin. He lived permanently in Thessaloniki on Papafi Street and died on March 30, 1992, having suffered a stroke and been diagnosed with liver cancer.

== See also ==
- Ancient Macedonians
- Macedon
- Vergina Sun

== Necrology ==
- Eugene N. Borza. "Manolis Andronikos, 1919–1992." American Journal of Archaeology 96.4 (Oct., 1992) 757–758.
