= 2006 Winter Olympics torch relay =

- Host city: Turin, Italy
- Countries visited: Greece, Vatican City, Malta, San Marino, Slovenia, Austria, Switzerland, France, Italy
- Distance: 11,300 kilometres (7,000 mi)
- Torchbearers: 10,001
- Start date: December 8, 2005
- End date: February 10, 2006
- Torch designer: Pininfarina

The 2006 Winter Olympics torch relay took part as part of the build-up to the 2006 Winter Olympics hosted in Turin, Italy. The route covered around 11,300 kilometres (7,000 mi) and involved 10,001. Stefania Belmondo lit the cauldron at the opening ceremony.

== Torch ==
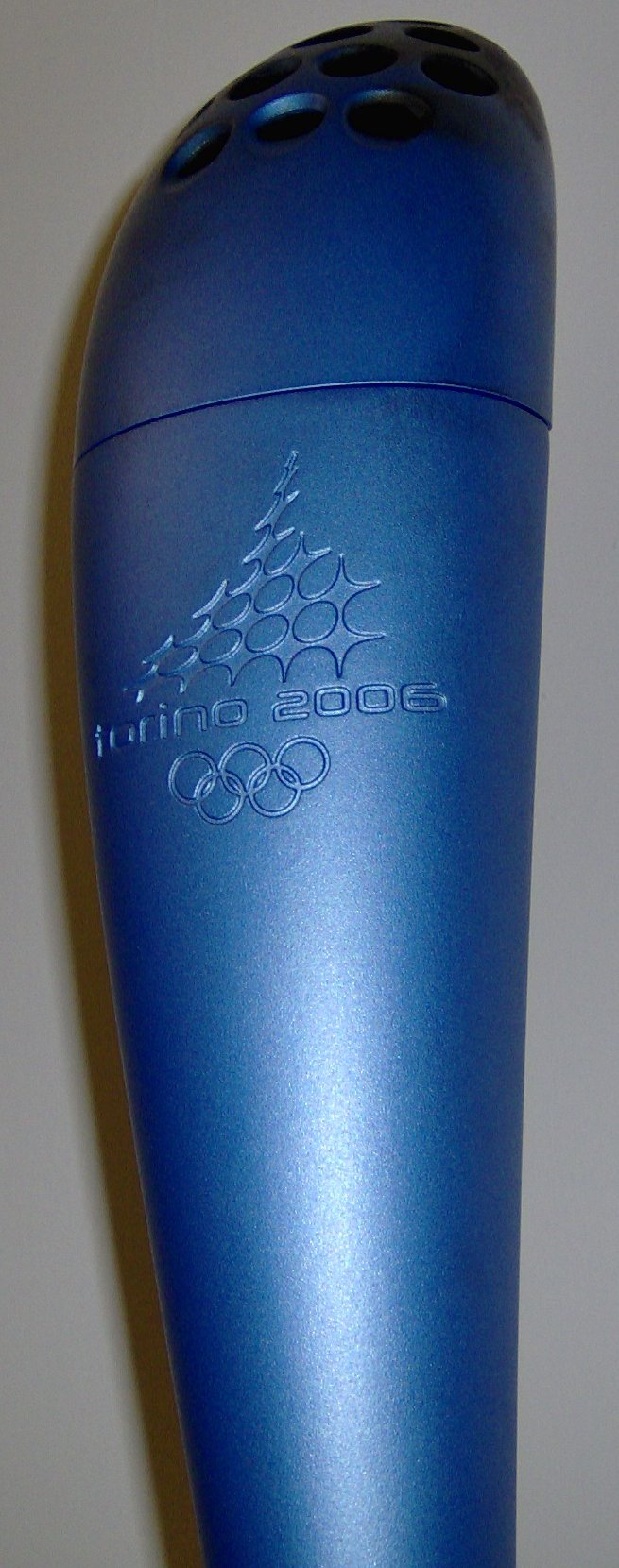
2006 Olympic Torch

The torch was a modern interpretation of the traditional wooden torch, in which it is the metal that seems to catch fire and burn. The flame envelops the body of the torch rather than exiting from a hole on the top, like earlier torches. A dynamic, innovative shape was created to develop this concept, which recalls the tip of a ski but also the building that is a symbol of Turin, the Mole Antonelliana. It is criticized for being too heavy at 1.97 kg (4.3 lb).

== Route in Greece ==
November 27

- Olympia

November 28

- Aroania, Kalavryta

November 29

- Parnassos Ski Centre

November 30

- Karpenisi, Pertouli

December 1

- Kalabaka, Metsovo

December 2

- Vasilitsa, Kozani

December 3

- Pisoderi

December 4

- Naousa, Kato Vermio

December 5

- Elatochori, Thessaloniki

December 7

- Volos, Stylida

December 8

- Arachova, Livadeia, Thebes, Athens

== Route in Italy ==
Date	Map
8 December (day 1): Rome: Quirinal Palace; Vatican City; 9 December (day 2): Rome: Genzano di Roma; Albano Laziale; Castel Gandolfo; Grottaferrata; Frascati; Grottaferrata; 10 December (day 3): Rieti: Viterbo; Orvieto; Terni; Labro	2006 Winter Olympics torch relay is located in Lazio
11 December (day 4): Perugia: Terni; Spoleto; Foligno; Assisi; Bastia Umbra	2006 Winter Olympics torch relay is located in Umbria
12 December (day 5): Siena: Montepulciano; Montalcino; Cinigiano; Grosseto; 13 December (day 6): Livorno: Colle di Val d'Elsa; Volterra; San Gimignano; Volterra; Cecina; Rosignano Marittimo; 14 December (day 7): Florence: Pontedera; Montopoli in Val d'Arno; San Miniato; Empoli; Lastra a Signa; Scandicci; 15 December (day 8): Lucca: Calenzano; Prato; Pistoia; Serravalle Pistoiese; Pieve a Nievole; Montecatini Terme; Buggiano; Pescia; Capannori; 16 December (day 9): Pisa: Abetone; Massarosa; Viareggio; Pisa; Vecchiano; San Giuliano Terme	2006 Winter Olympics torch relay is located in Tuscany
December 17 (day 10): La Spezia; December 18 (day 11): Genoa	2006 Winter Olympics torch relay is located in Liguria
December 19 (day 12): Nuoro; December 20 (day 13): Cagliari	2006 Winter Olympics torch relay is located in Sardinia
December 21 (day 14): Ragusa; December 22 (day 15): Agrigento; December 23 (day 16): Palermo; December 26 (day 17): Catania	2006 Winter Olympics torch relay is located in Sicily
December 27 (day 18): Reggio Calabria; December 28 (day 19): Catanzaro; December 29 (day 20): Cosenza	2006 Winter Olympics torch relay is located in Calabria
December 30 (day 21): Potenza	2006 Winter Olympics torch relay is located in Basilicata
December 31 (day 22): Naples	2006 Winter Olympics torch relay is located in Campania
January 1, 2006 (day 23): Frosinone	2006 Winter Olympics torch relay is located in Lazio
January 2 (day 24): Benevento	2006 Winter Olympics torch relay is located in Campania
January 3 (day 25): Taranto; January 4 (day 26): Lecce; January 5 (day 27): Bari; January 6 (day 28): Foggia	2006 Winter Olympics torch relay is located in Apulia
January 7 (day 29): Campobasso	2006 Winter Olympics torch relay is located in Molise
January 8 (day 30): Pescara; January 9 (day 31): L'Aquila	2006 Winter Olympics torch relay is located in Abruzzo
January 10 (day 32): Ancona	2006 Winter Olympics torch relay is located in Marche
January 11 (day 33): Arezzo	2006 Winter Olympics torch relay is located in Tuscany
January 12 (day 35): Rimini; January 13 (day 36): Bologna; January 14 (day 37): Parma	2006 Winter Olympics torch relay is located in Emilia-Romagna
January 15 (day 38): Mantua	2006 Winter Olympics torch relay is located in Lombardy
January 16 (day 39): Verona; January 17 (day 40): Venice	2006 Winter Olympics torch relay is located in Veneto
January 18 (day 41): Trieste; January 19 (day 42): Udine; January 20 (day 43): Tarvisio	2006 Winter Olympics torch relay is located in Friuli-Venezia Giulia
January 21 (day 44): Belluno; January 22 (day 45): Treviso	2006 Winter Olympics torch relay is located in Veneto
January 23 (day 46): Trento; January 24 (day 47): Bolzano; January 25 (day 48): Urtijëi	2006 Winter Olympics torch relay is located in Trentino-Alto Adige/Südtirol
January 26 (day 49): Cortina d'Ampezzo	2006 Winter Olympics torch relay is located in Veneto
January 27 (day 50): Merano	2006 Winter Olympics torch relay is located in Trentino-Alto Adige/Südtirol
January 28 (day 51): Lecco; January 29 (day 52): Milan	2006 Winter Olympics torch relay is located in Lombardy
January 30 (day 53): Varese; January 31 (day 54): Pavia	2006 Winter Olympics torch relay is located in Lombardy
February 1 (day 55): Savona	2006 Winter Olympics torch relay is located in Liguria
February 2 (day 56): Cuneo; February 3 (day 57): Pinerolo; February 4 (day 58): Sestriere; February 5 (day 59): Bardonecchia	2006 Winter Olympics torch relay is located in Piedmont
February 6 (day 60): Albertville	2006 Winter Olympics torch relay is located in France
February 7 (day 61): Aosta	2006 Winter Olympics torch relay is located in Aosta Valley
February 8 (day 62): Venaria Reale; February 9 (day 63): Turin; February 10 (day 64): Stadio Olimpico	2006 Winter Olympics torch relay is located in Piedmont
