= Christos Davelis =

19th century Greek bandit and folk figure

Christos Davelis (real name: Christos Natsios, circa 1832 – 12 July 1856) was an infamous Greek brigand operating in the regions of Attica and Boeotia.

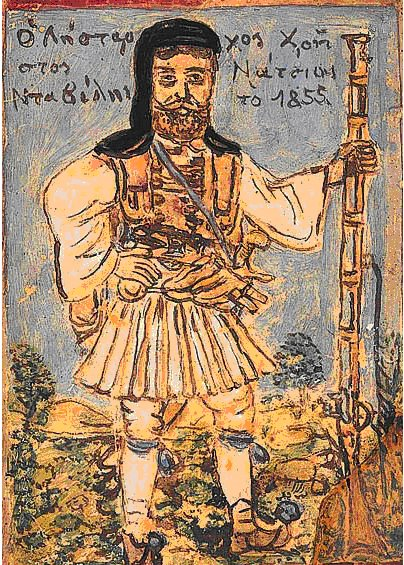
Painting of Christos Davelis by Theophilos

== Biography ==
=== Early years ===
According to an older account, Christos Natsios was born in the town of Steiri, Boeotia in 1832. A newer opinion assumes descent from the nearby town of Arachova, while other writers point to the town of Styra, on the island of Euboea.

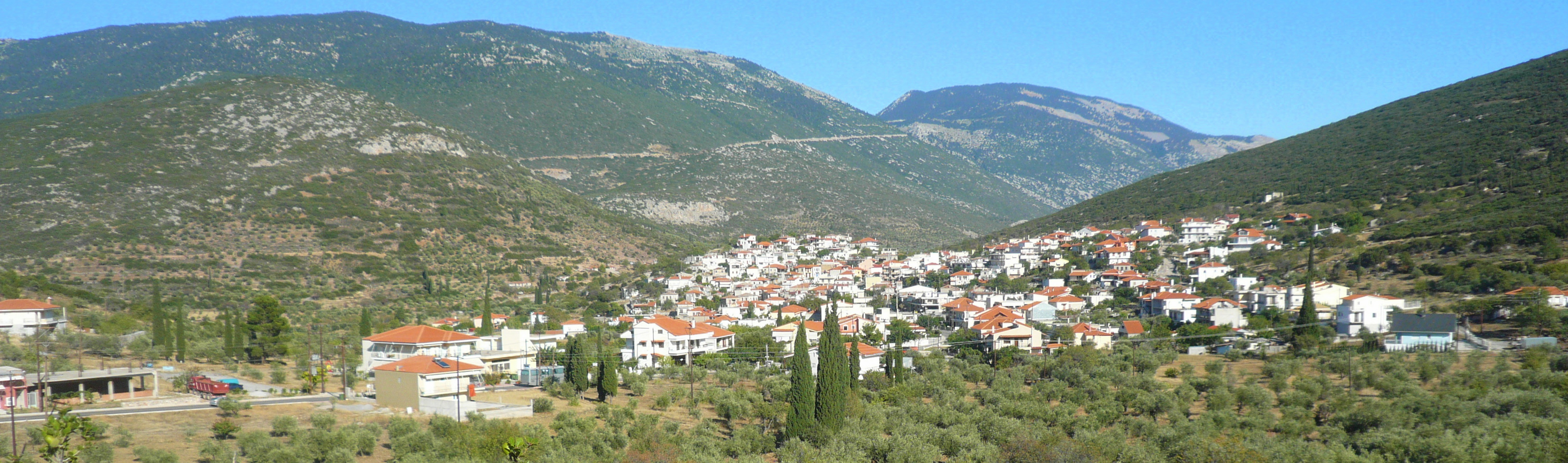
Steiri, Boeotia

For a period of time Davelis had been a shepherd tending to the flocks of Daou Pentelis monastery, in the Attic countryside, whose milk he sold in Athens, the Greek capital. Another account claims that he tended to the flocks of Petraki monastery instead, in Kolonaki, right outside Athens itself at the time. The abbot of the Monastery once gave the shepherd a letter to deliver to a nun in Athens, making Natsios curious and taking it to someone who could read it for him. Learning of its contents, he met with the nun himself and became a frequent visitor. The abbot eventually learned of this, and in anger reported Natsios to the authorities, accusing him of theft.

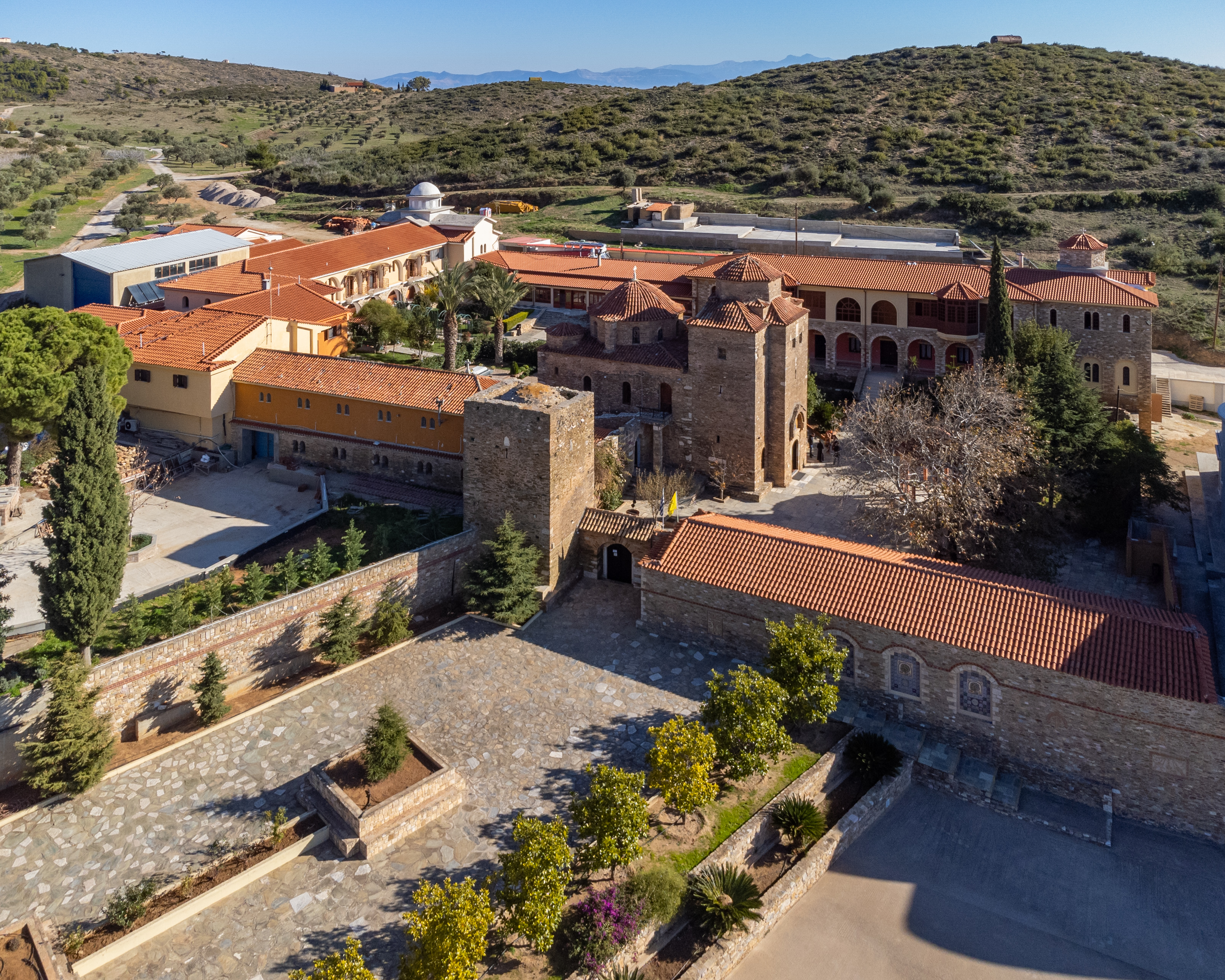
Dormition of the Theotokos (Daou Pentelis) monastery, eastern Attica

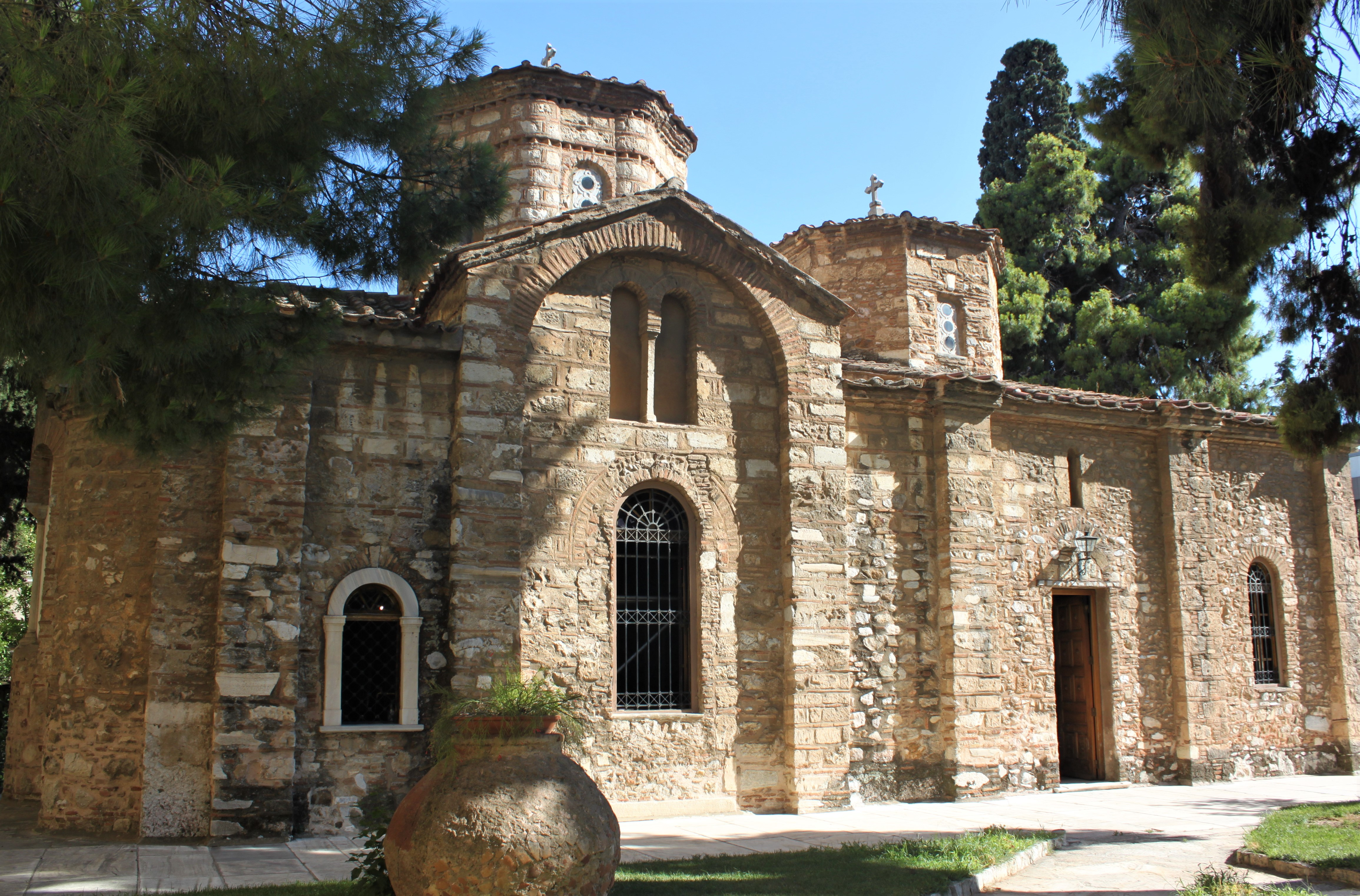
Petraki monastery, Kolonaki, central Athens

Arrested, Natsios was convicted and punished via bastinado, after which he left for Styra, in Euboea. While in Styra, he fell in love with a priest's daughter, who was already betrothed to a wealthy shepherd. When an army unit arrived in the village searching for a deserter by the name of Nastos, the shepherd pointed to Natsios as revenge. Not managing to convince the officers that he was not the deserter in question, a fight broke out when an arrest attempt was made, resulting in a soldier getting killed and Natsios escaping.

=== Brigandage ===
After the Styra incident, he took refuge in the mountains, joining the gang ran by his mother's cousin, the famed bandit Kakarapis (real name Beloulias). In due time, he took up the nickname Davelis (of uncertain etymology) and formed his own gang, robbing travellers, peasants and shepherds, as was standard practice for brigand gangs in Greece at the time. He and his gang were mostly active in Attikovoiotia prefecture, modern day Attica and Boeotia.

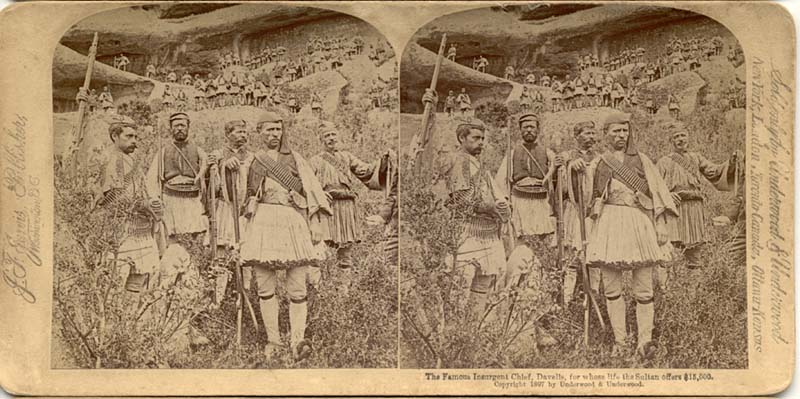
The Davelis gang

After some time, the Italian duchess Luisa Bacoli requested the gang's protection to safely visit the ruins of Delphi on mount Parnassus, in the central Greek region of Phocis, an area where Davelis was active. The two then allegedly fell in love. Consequently, Davelis' second-in-command, Ioannis Megas, who had also fallen in love with the duchess, defected to the Greek Gendarmerie, becoming an officer.

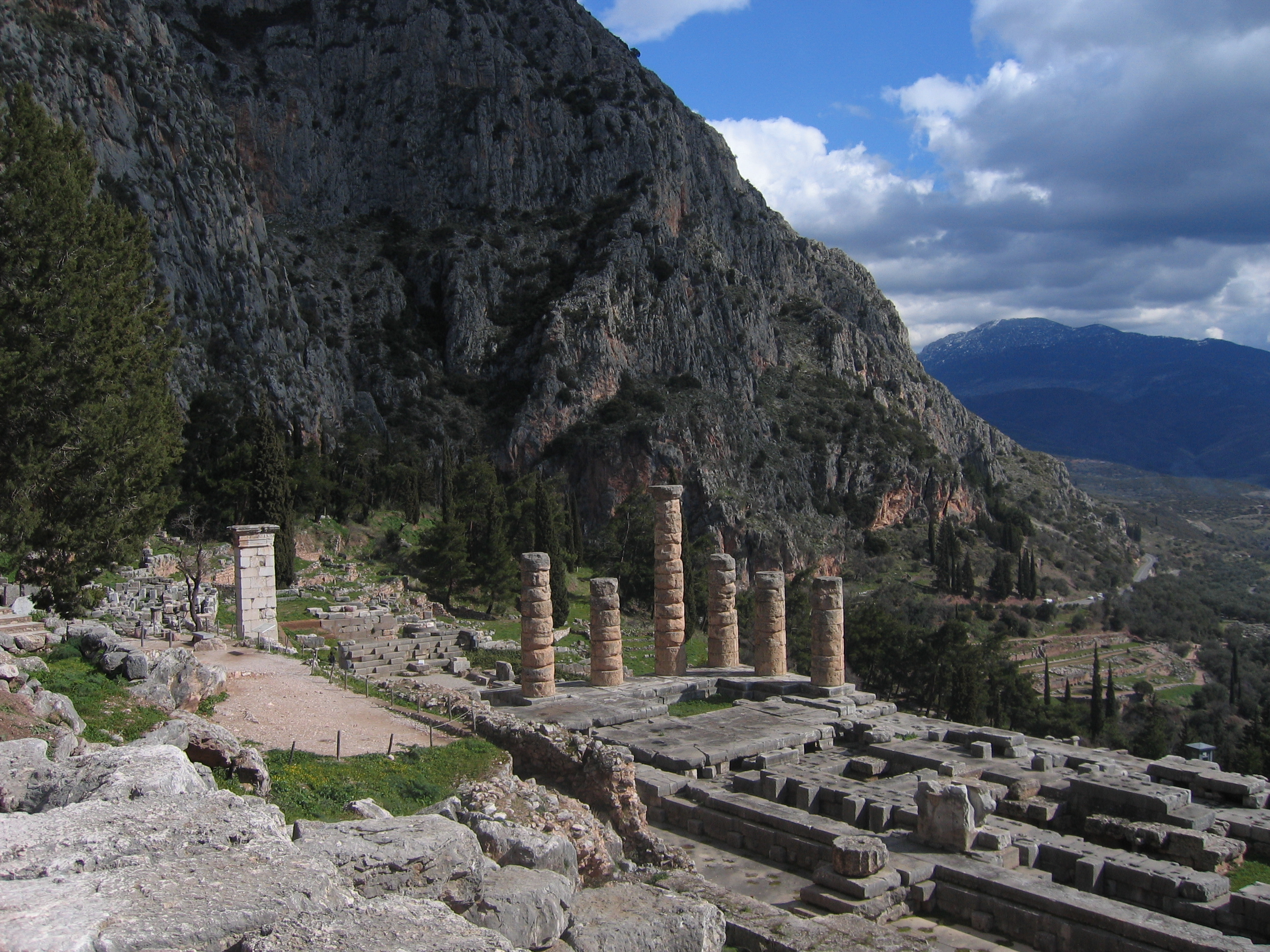
Delphi in 2005

=== Kidnapping of officer Berteau ===
Davelis' brigand activities were not seen as anything special for its time, excluding an incident popularised and lauded domestically as an act of resistance against foreign interventionism, adding to Davelis' future folk reputation. In 1855, during the Crimean War, Athens was blockaded by British and French fleets and the port of Piraeus was occupied, in order to force the country to not join the war on the side of the Russian Empire. Davelis proceeded to descend on the city and kidnap French officer Berteau (or Breteau) in Peiraios Avenue, the main road connecting Piraeus to Athens. Davelis was given 30,000 drachma in gold by the Greek government as ransom for the officer's release. The ransom was paid as quickly as possible to both avoid further foreign intervention in Greek internal affairs as well as cover up the existing connections between brigands and politicians.

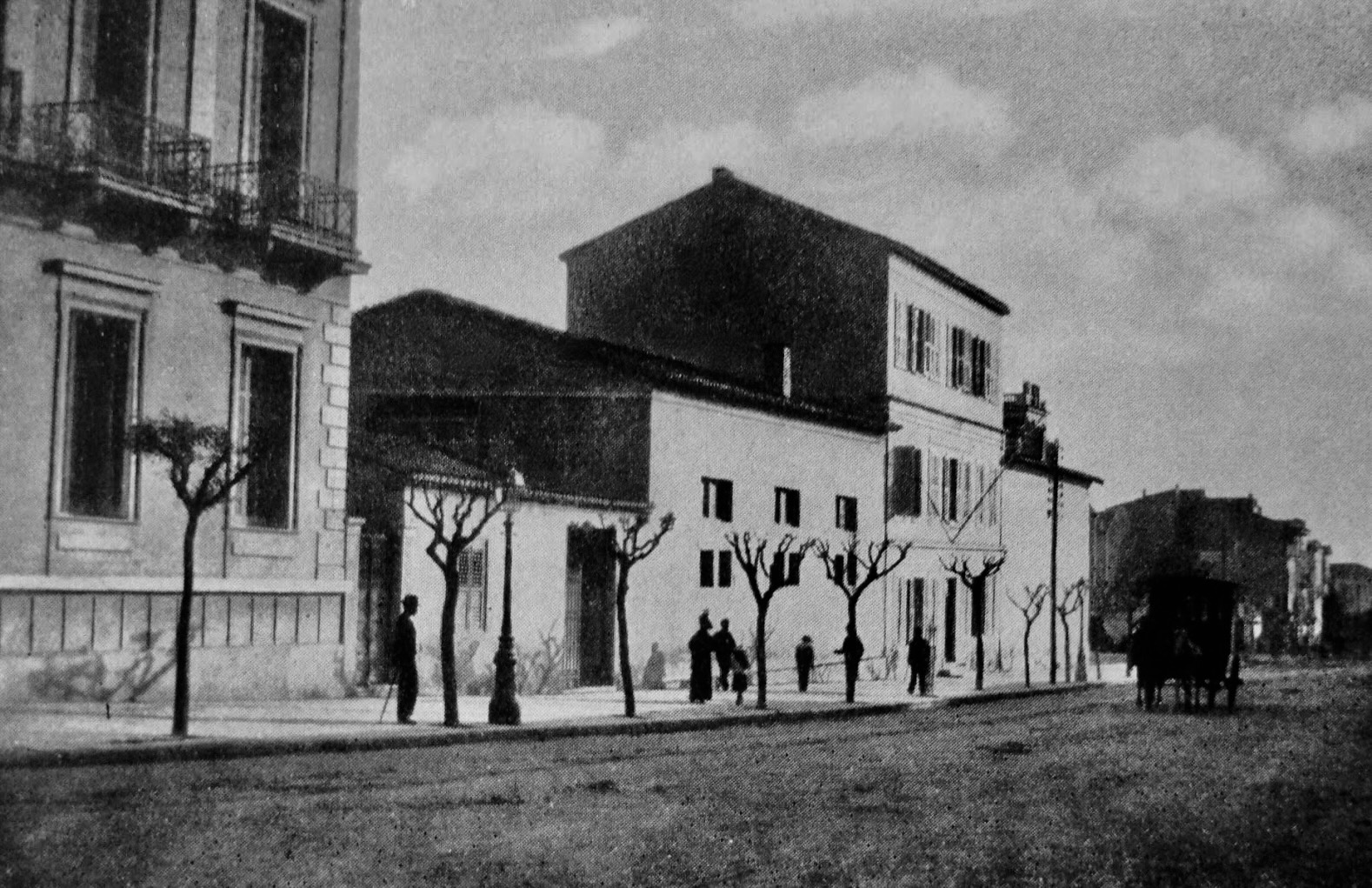
Peiraios Street in 1889, 53 years after Davelis’ death

=== Downfall ===
Davelis' criminal activity on the northern outskirts of Athens reached an all-time peak in the spring of 1856. In May, he ambushed the gendarmes stationed in the town of Menidi, in Attica, forcing them to lay down their arms. Seeking revenge for their humiliation, the Gendarmerie unleashed a manhunt which brought the brigand all the way to Mount Parnassus. Around the same time, the written correspondence between Davelis and Bacoli was intercepted by the Gendarmerie, depriving the bandits of the element of surprise and an escape route, as the duchess was arranging safe passage for Davelis and his gang to Italy. The brigands were finally surrounded in Zemeno pass, on the foothills of Parnassus.

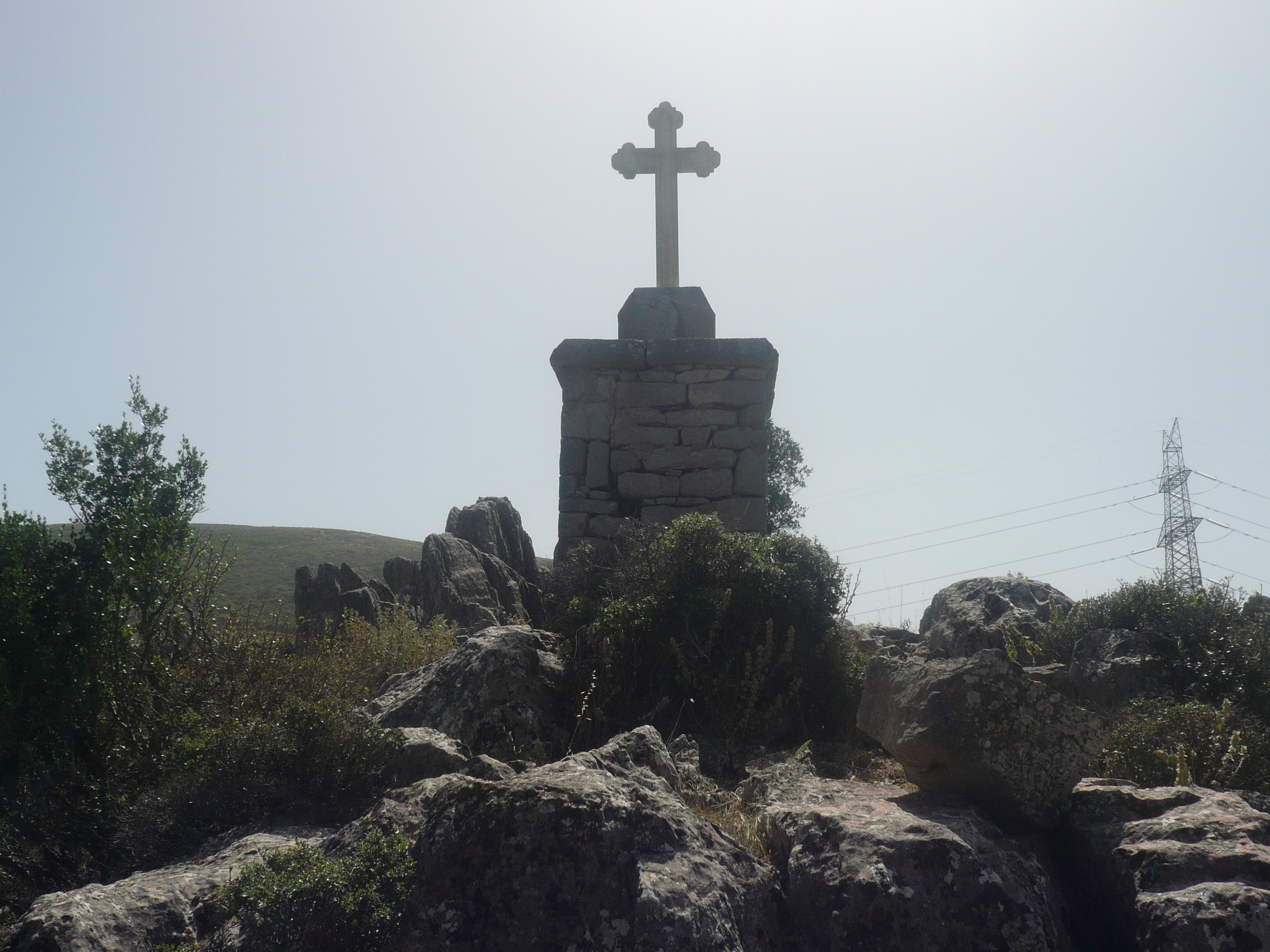
Monument to officer Megas, on the spot of Davelis and Megas’ deaths in Zemeno pass

In the ensuing battle, Davelis challenged his former right-hand man, Megas, who was present, to a duel to the death. Megas attempted to behead Davelis with his firearm's bayonet, however he was fatally shot by Davelis before he himself was stabbed by another gendarme. Folk tradition claims that the bandit's last words were "Neither shall Davelis be in the mountains, nor shall Megas be in the palace." Davelis' head was then retrieved and displayed in plain view in Syntagma Square in Athens for many days, impaled on a pike.

== Folklore ==
Davelis is a prominent figure in modern Greek folklore and an icon of the brigandry rampart in 19th and early 20th century Greece. As a result, his biography has been largely embellished by popular myths and legends. One such legend claims that he would regularly leave his camp to go to Athens in disguise, casually conversing with patrons at the coffee shops he would visit, his true identity remaining hidden.

A well-known myth claims that Davelis had an affair with French noblewoman Sophie de Marbois-Lebrun, Duchess of Plaisance, visiting her in her home in Rododafni Castle every night from his lair in the Cave of the Immaculate on mount Penteli, a short distance from the castle. A version of this tale claims that there were underground tunnels leading from the cave directly to the château. These claims are most likely false, since all available evidence points to Davelis being active around mount Penteli only after the Duchess had died. Despite that, the legend persisted enough for the former hideout to be called Davelis Cave today.

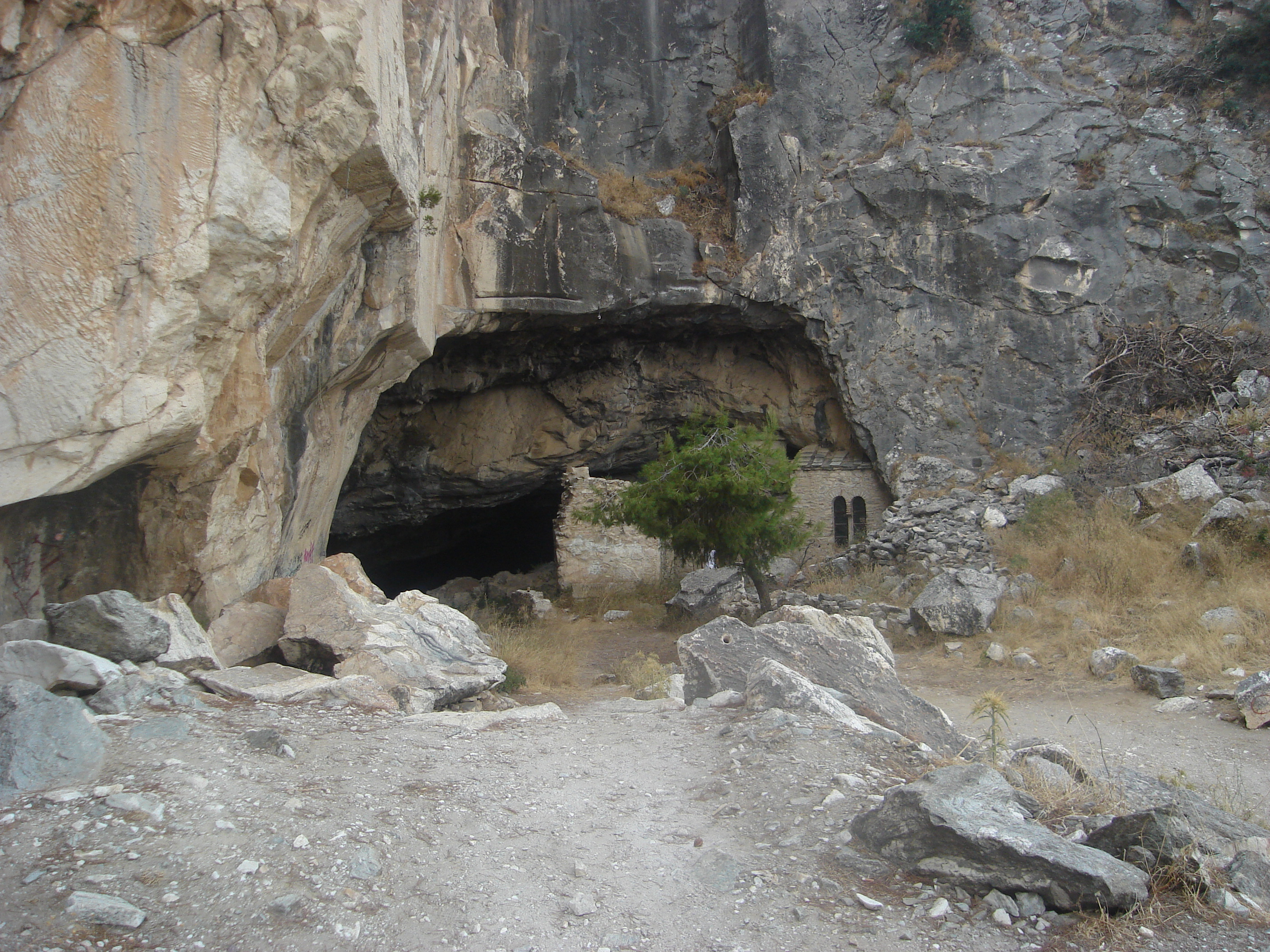
Davelis Cave on mount Penteli

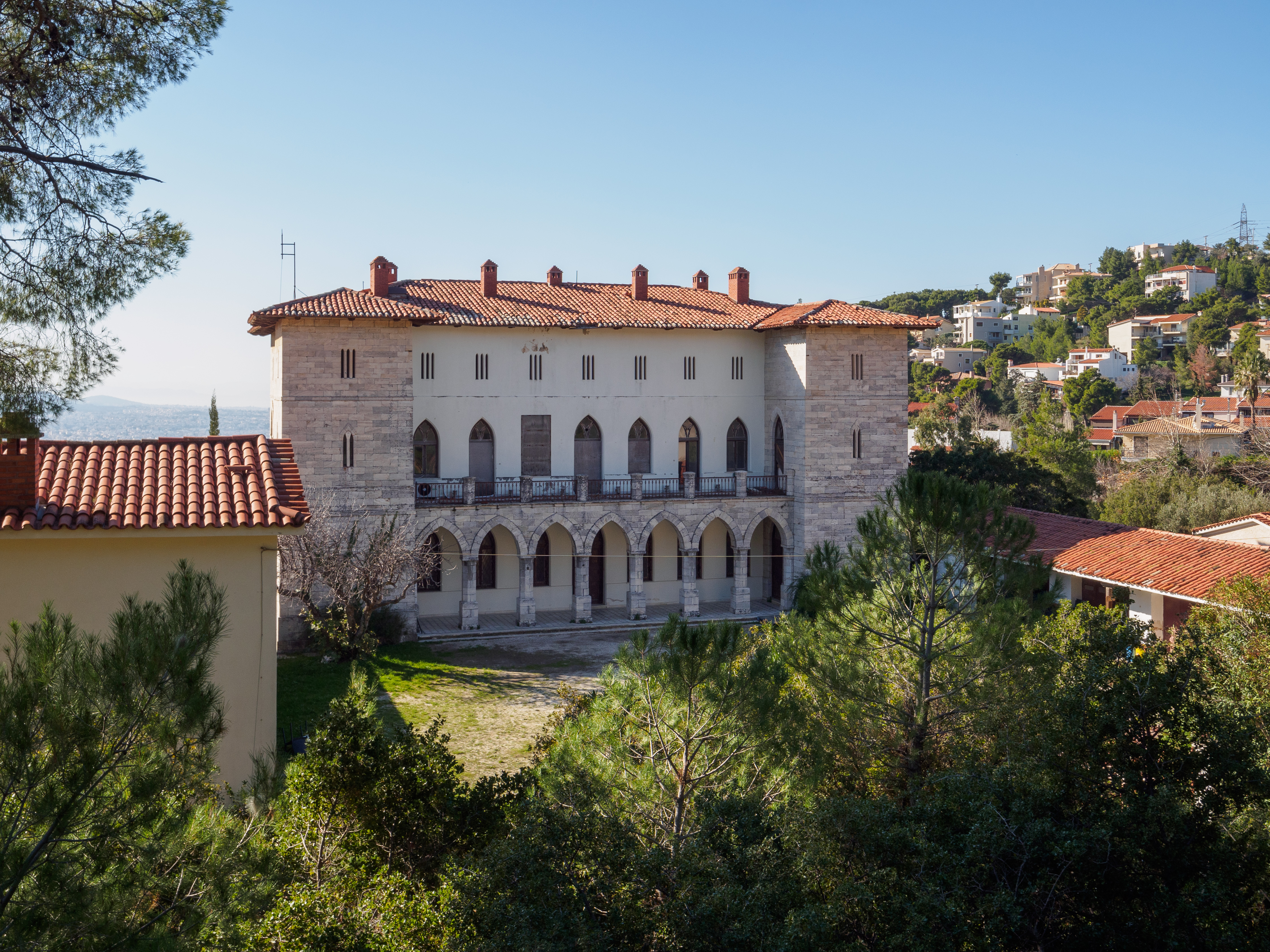
Rododafni Castle, Penteli

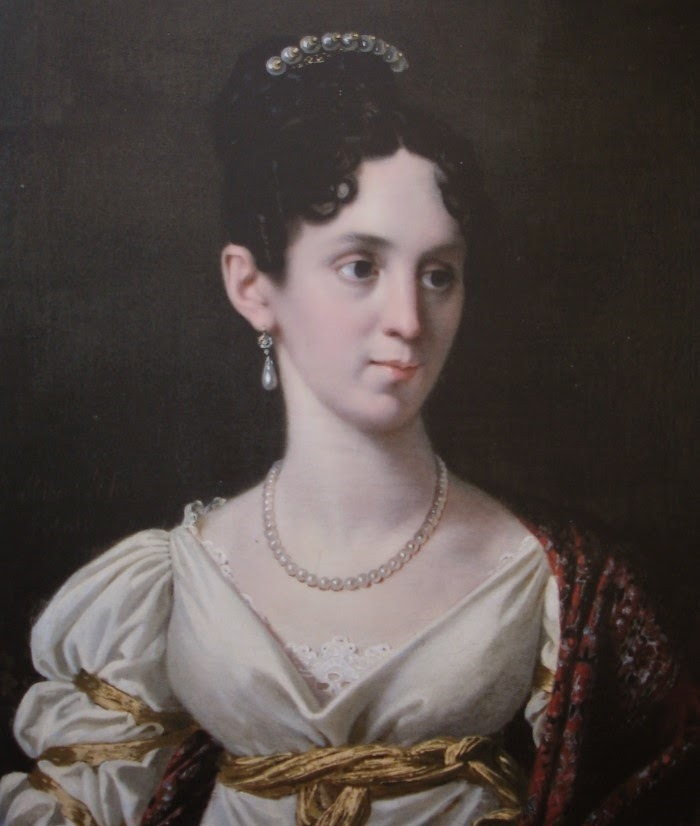
Sophie de Marbois-Lebrun

== Bibliography ==
- Tomkinson, John L. (2002). Athens : the suburbs. Greece beyond the guidebooks, 3. Athens: Anagnosis. ISBN 9-608-71862-7. OCLC 54097724.
