= Thomopoulos =

Thomopoulos is a surname. Notable people with the surname include:

- Anthony Thomopoulos, American film and television executive
- Anne Thomopoulos, American television producer
- Epameinondas Thomopoulos (1878–1976), Greek artist
- Stefanos Thomopoulos (1859–1939), Greek writer and historian
- Georgios Thomopoulos, Greek revolutionary of the Macedonian Struggle
