= Themistoklis Konitsas =

Greek politician (1901–1980)

Themistoklis Konitsas of Ioannis (Greek: Θεμιστοκλής Κονίτσας του Ιωάννη; born in Arachova, 1901 – died in Athens, 20 November 1980) was a Greek lawyer and politician. He acted as MP in the Boeotia constituency and held the position as Undersecretary.
