= Loukas Papaioannou =

Greek physician and professor

Loukas Papaioannou (Greek: Λουκάς Παπαϊωάννου; Arachova, 1831 – Athens, 1890) was a distinguished Greek university professor and physician. He was one of the founders of the study of anatomy in Greece. He was twice mayor of Arachova.
