= Elatochori =

Village in Pieria, Greece

Elatochori Ελατοχώρι
- Community
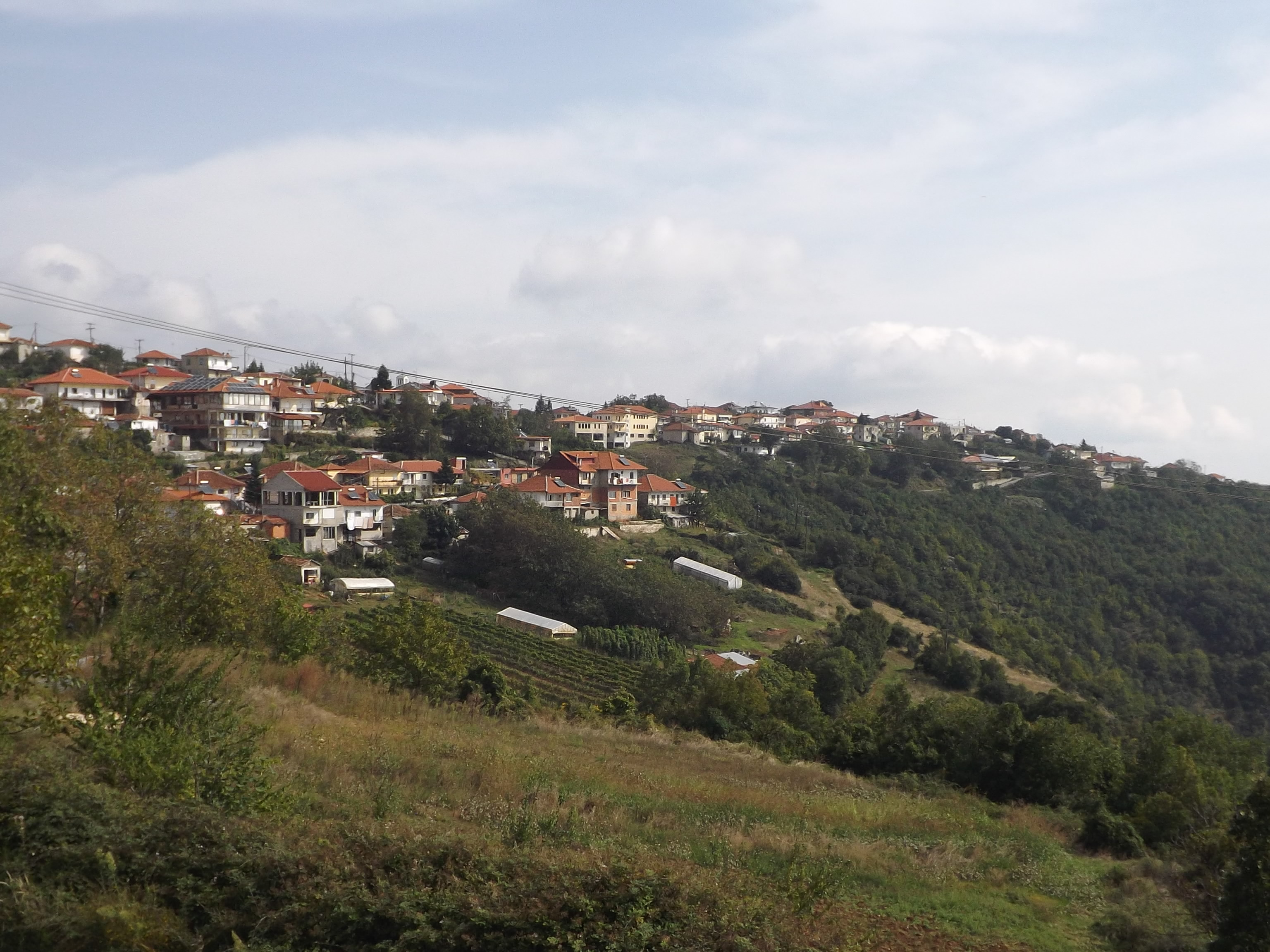
- A view of Elatochori

- Location within Greece
- Coordinates: 40°19.2′N 22°16′E
- Country: Greece
- Administrative region: Central Macedonia
- Regional unit: Pieria
- Municipality: Katerini
- Municipal unit: Pierioi

Area
  - Community: 38.872 km^{2} (15.009 sq mi)
- Elevation: 780 m (2,560 ft)

Population (2021)
  - Community: 447
  - Density: 11.5/km^{2} (29.8/sq mi)
- Time zone: UTC+2 (EET)
  - Summer (DST): UTC+3 (EEST)
- Postal code: 601 00
- Area code: +30-2351
- Vehicle registration: KN

Elatochori (Greek: Ελατοχώρι) is a village and a community of the Katerini municipality. Before the 2011 local government reform it was part of the municipality of Pierioi, of which it was a municipal district. The 2021 census recorded 447 inhabitants in the village. The community of Elatochori covers an area of 38.872 km^{2}.

== Geography ==
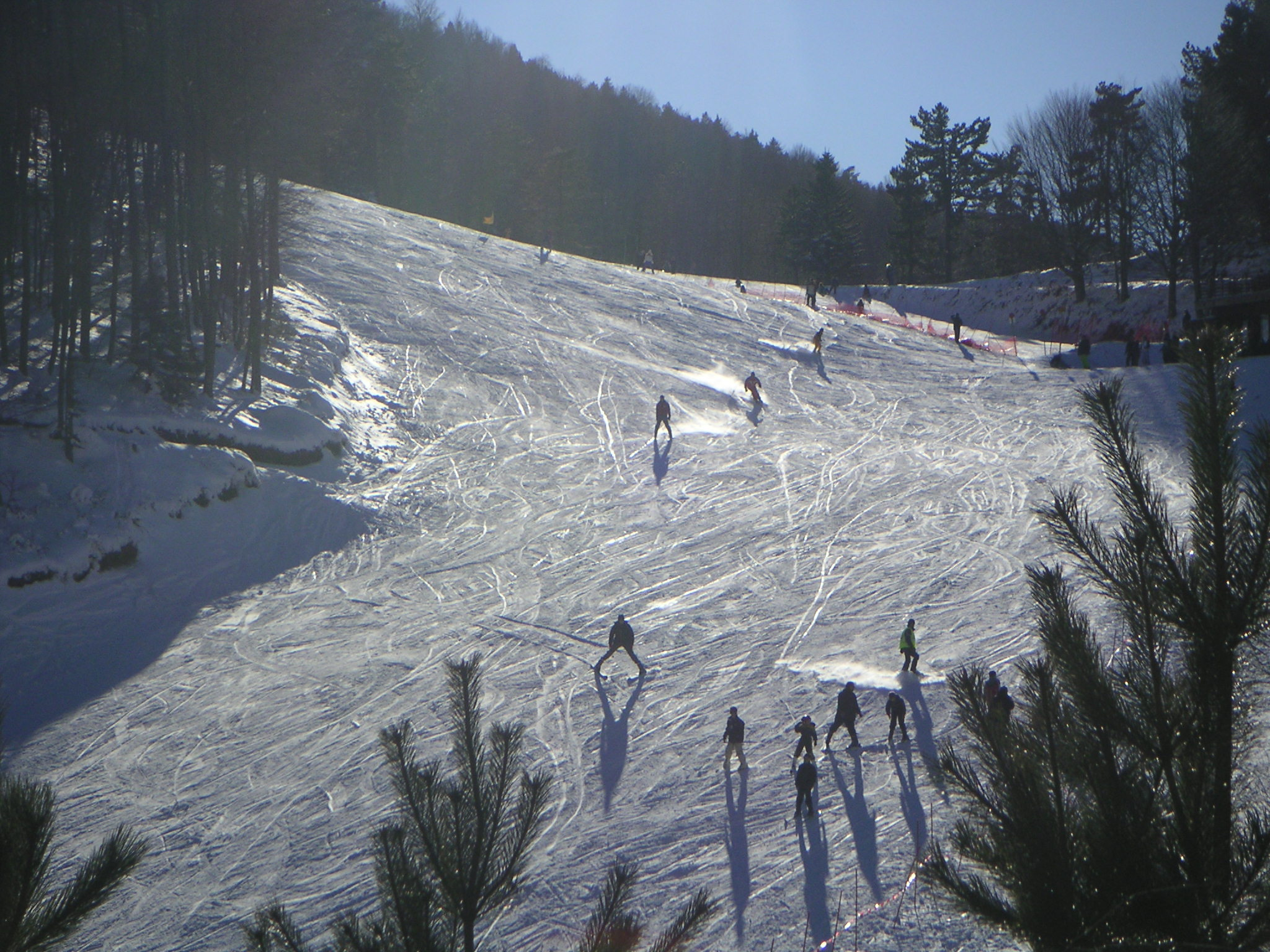
Elatochori ski centre.

Elatochori is situated west of Katerini, and south of Veria. It is a mountainous village that lies on the Pierian Mountains. There is also a ski resort 6 km from the village.

== Population ==
Historical population
Year	Pop.	±%
2001	610	—
2011	533	−12.6%
2021	447	−16.1%

== Elatochori Ski Center ==
Elatochori is known for its ski center, which is located at an altitude of 1,400 to 1,800 meters (4,600 to 5,900 ft) on the southeastern slopes of the Pierian Mountains. At the base of the ski resort and at the location "Papá Choráfi", there is a dining room and a chalet with a total area of 450 m^{2} (4,800 ft^{2}) with a capacity of more than 400 people. It operated for the first time on a trial basis, in 2000, and officially in 2001. It is 8 km (5.0 mi) from the village and 36 km (22 mi) from the city of Katerini. The Ski Sports and Mountaineering Association operates in the Ski Center.

== See also ==
- List of settlements in the Pieria regional unit
