= Georgios Thomopoulos =

Greek revolutionary of the Macedonian Struggle

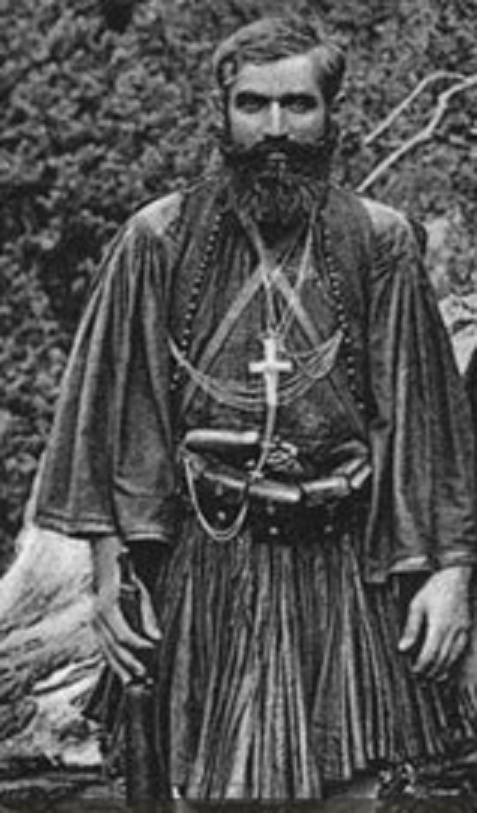
- Georgios Thomopoulos during the Macedonian Struggle.
- Native name: Γεώργιος Θωμόπουλος
- Nickname(s): Kapetan Gogos (Καπετάν Γκόγκος)
- Born: c. 1866; Ritini, Salonika Vilayet, Ottoman Empire (now Greece)
- Died: c. 1952; Kingdom of Greece
- Allegiance: Kingdom of Greece
- Service / branch: HMC; Hellenic Army
- Battles / wars: Macedonian Struggle; Balkan Wars: First Balkan War; Second Balkan War
- Awards: Commemorative Medal for the Macedonian Struggle

Georgios Thomopoulos (Greek: Γεώργιος Θωμόπουλος) was a Greek revolutionary of the Macedonian Struggle, known by the nom de guerre Captain Gogos (Καπετάν Γκόγκος).

== Biography ==
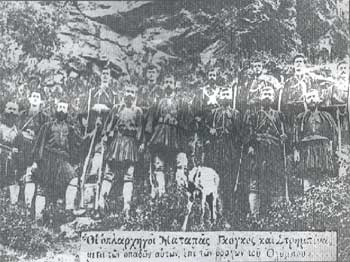
The chieftains Georgios Thomopoulos, Nikolaos Strebinos and Michail Anagnostakos with their armed group.

Thomopoulos was born in Ritini of Pieria in about 1866. From the beginning of the Macedonian Struggle he joined as a soldier in the guerrilla groups that acted in the region. He soon emerged as a chieftain and set up his own armed group, headed and known by the nickname "Captain Gogos."

He acted with his group in the area of Mount Olympus with the main task of protecting the Greek population from Ottoman aggression, providing security to the supplies that were directed to Macedonia by the Greek state, and the suppression of the Romanian propaganda among the Aromanian population. He collaborated with chieftain Nikolaos Strebinos, as well as with Nikolaos Rokas, Michail Anagnostakos and Georgios Frangakos (Maleas).

After the Young Turk Revolution and the granting of amnesty to the rebels, Thomopoulos was forced to flee with his family which was prosecuted by the Ottoman authorities. He took part as a volunteer with his group in the Balkan Wars.

He died in 1952.

== Sources ==
- John S. Koliopoulos (editor), Αφανείς, γηγενείς Μακεδονομάχοι, Εταιρεία Μακεδονικών Σπουδών, University Studio Press, Thessaloniki, 2008, p. 132
- Hellenic Army General Staff, Army History Directorate, Ο Μακεδονικός Αγών και τα εις Θράκην γεγονότα, Athens 1979, p. 294
- Konstantinos A. Vakalopoulos, Ο ένοπλος αγώνας στη Μακεδονία 1904–1908, Irodotos, Thessaloniki, 1999, p. 323, 337
- Αρχείο Διεύθυνσης Εφέδρων Πολεμιστών Αγωνιστών Θυμάτων Αναπήρων (ΔΕΠΑΘΑ), Αρχείο Μακεδονικού Αγώνα, φ. Θ-36
