= Davelis Cave =

Cave on the southwest slope of Mount Penteli, Greece

Coordinates: 38.0708°N 23.8769°E

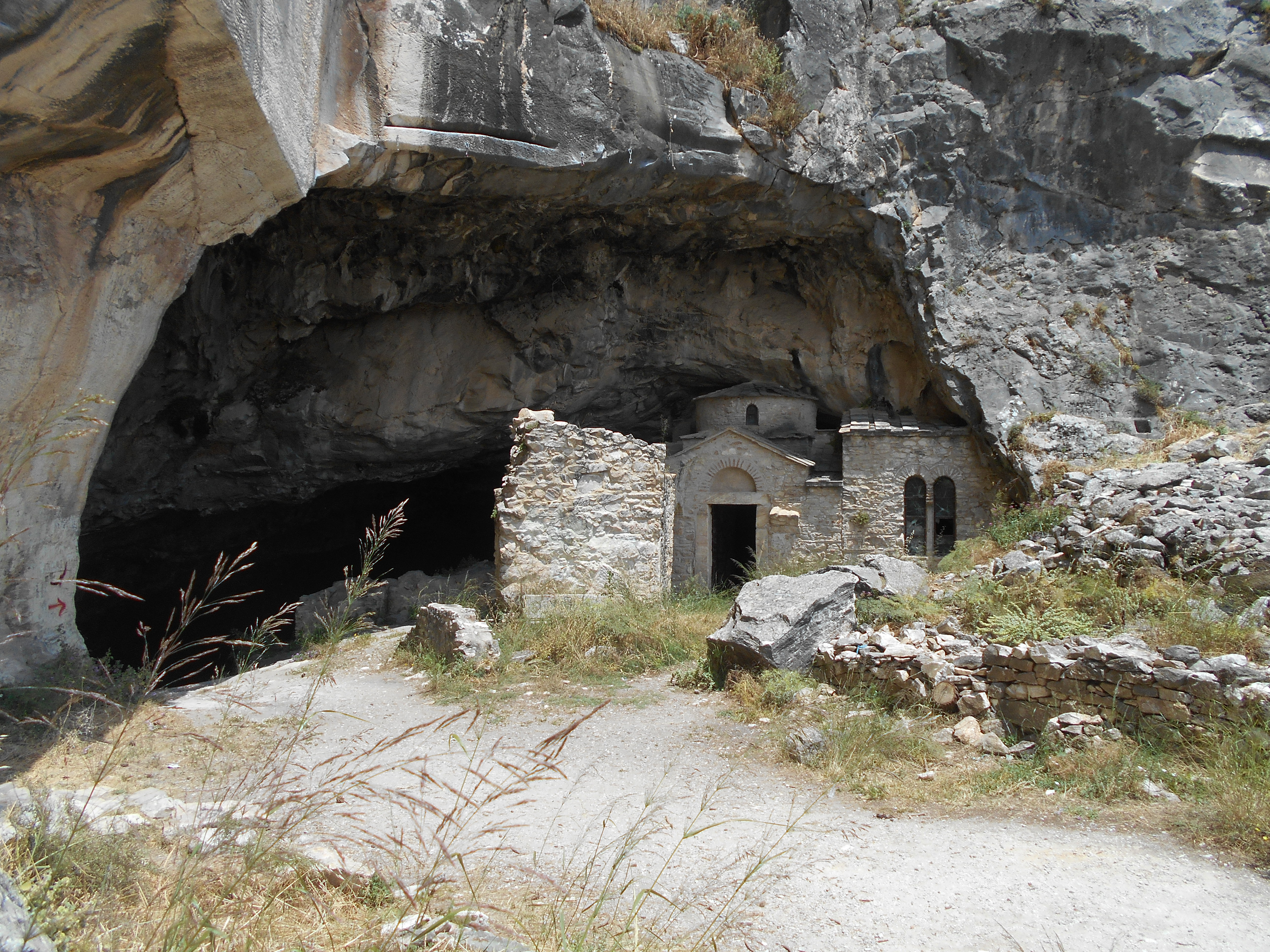
Davelis Cave in 2015

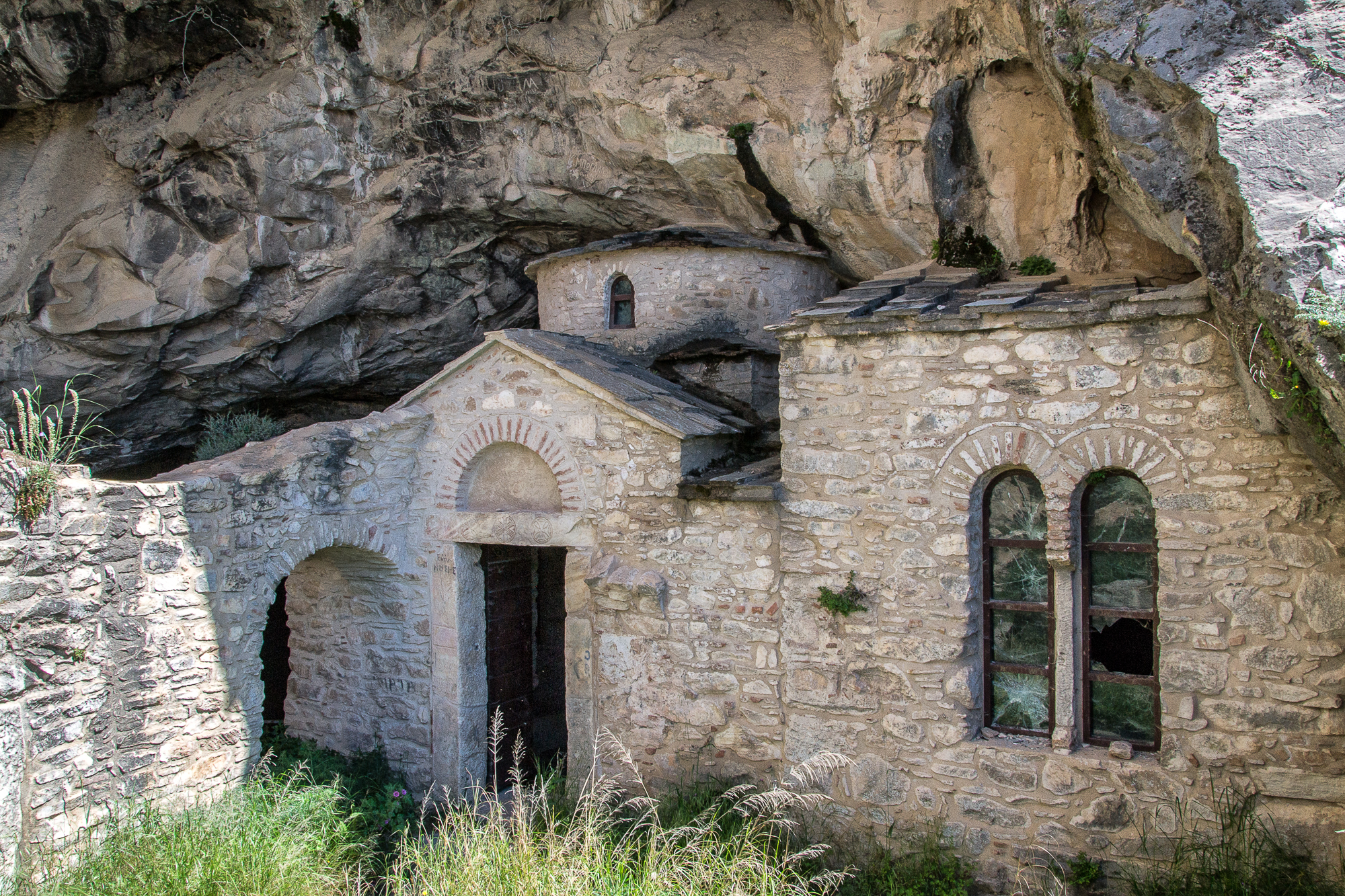
The double church of SS. Spiridon and Nicholas in 2014

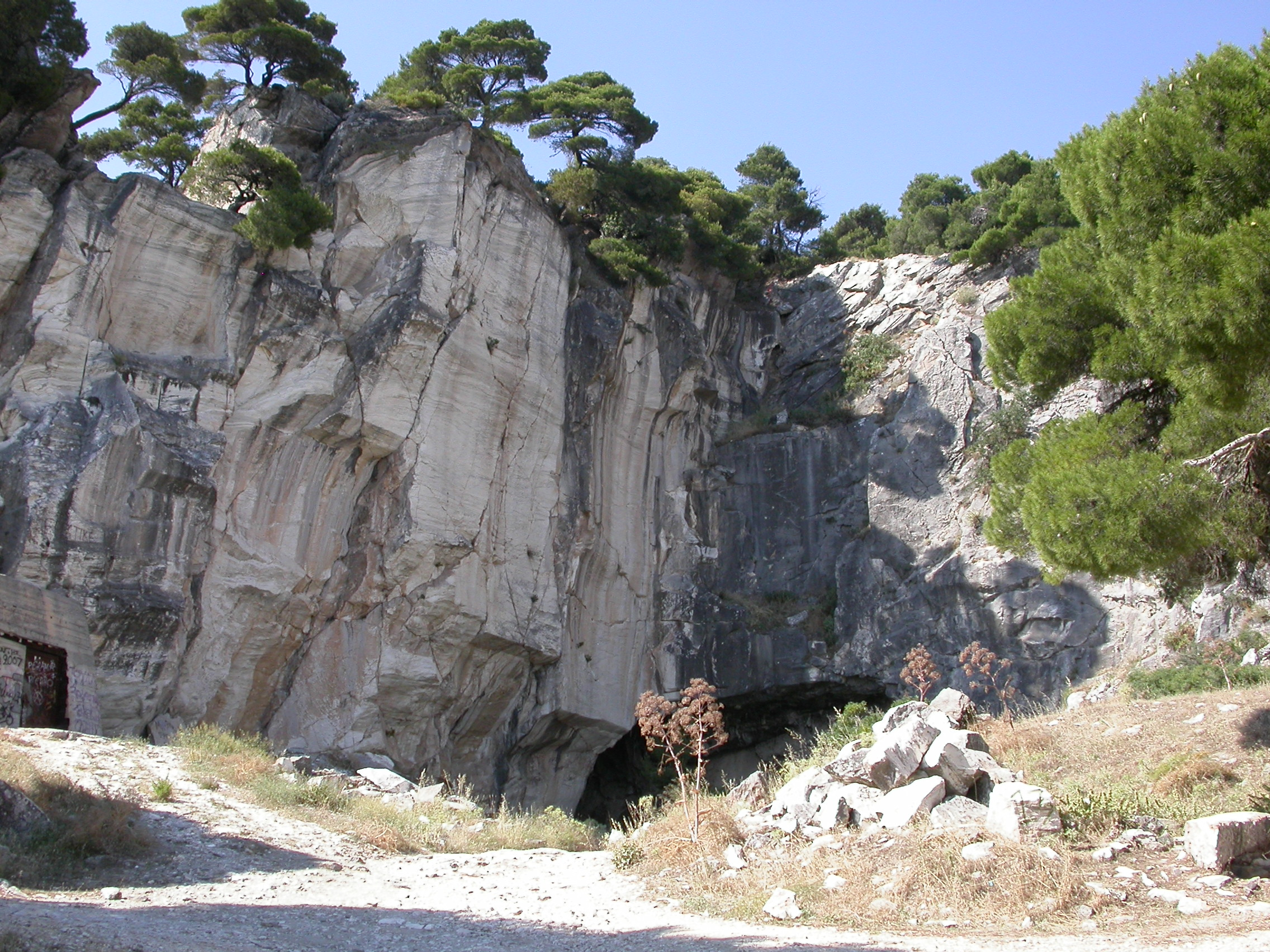
The ancient marble quarry outside the cave in 2007

Davelis Cave (Greek: Σπηλιά Νταβέλη), also known as the Cave of Penteli (Greek: Σπηλιά Πεντέλης), is a cave on the southwestern slope of Mount Penteli (ancient Pentelikon), northeast of Athens. It received its modern nickname, "the cave of Davelis", because of a popular association with the 19th-century brigand Christos Davelis. The cave is situated in an ancient quarry, known as the Spilia quarry, at an elevation of c. 700 m. above sea level. This quarry produced the Pentelic marble used in the Parthenon and other buildings of classical Athens, and the quarried rock faces still preserve the marks of chisels and wedges. An ancient paved path along which the quarried blocks were dragged on sledges to the bottom of the slope is also partly preserved.

Although it is sometimes claimed that Pan was worshiped in the cave in antiquity, there is no evidence of ancient religious activity at the site. A much smaller cave further up the slope to the northeast, at an elevation of c. 800 m, housed a shrine of Pan and the nymphs from the 5th century BCE to the Roman period. It was discovered and partially excavated in 1952 and reexamined in 1975. Among the finds were lamps, terracotta figurines of Pan and the nymphs, and two votive reliefs of marble, now in the National Archaeological Museum, Athens.

Christian activity is attested at the Davelis Cave from the Late Roman or Early Byzantine period, in the form of inscriptions and rock-cut graffiti of crosses, angels, and eagles. At the entrance to the cave a small double church was constructed in two phases between the 10th and 12th centuries. The south chapel, dedicated to Saint Spiridon, is the earlier of the two and was cut back into the wall of the cave itself. The north chapel, dedicated to Saint Nicholas, was added later and built of masonry with a small dome. The frescoes in the church date to the first half of the 13th century and are similar in style and iconography to the decoration of the church of Saint Peter in Kalyvia Thorikou in southeastern Attica. The church was damaged by work conducted inside the cave by the Greek military in the late 1970s and early 1980s, and some of the frescos were removed to the Byzantine and Christian Museum in Athens for preservation. It sustained additional minor damage in the forest fires of August 2024.

The quarry and the cave have attracted tourists since the 18th century, among them the English travelers Richard Chandler and Edward Dodwell. Dodwell, who visited the site on 22 June 1805, wrote

The quarry is grand, and is cut into perpendicular precipices; the marks of the tools are still visible upon its surface. Several frusta of columns and large masses have been left scattered about. ... At the base of the precipice we find some natural caverns, which have been improved by art: one of the caverns contains the ruins of a church, in which the singular mixture of broken arches and subterraneous passages, cut through the marble rock, receiving from without a dim and mysterious light, has a peculiarly striking and picturesque effect; which a mass of pendant ivy, nearly closing the entrance of the cavern, contributes to augment

== Sources ==
- R. Chandler, Travels in Greece, or, an Account of a Tour Made at the Expense of the Society of Dilettanti, Oxford, 1776.
- E. Dodwell, A Classical and Topographical Tour Through Greece During the Years 1801, 1805, and 1806, London, 1819.
- H. Goette, Athens, Attica, and the Megarid: An Archaeological Guide, London, 2001.
- M. Korres, From Pentelicon to the Parthenon, Athens, 1995.
- D. Mouriki, "Οι βυζαντινές τοιχογραφίες των παρεκκλησίων της Σπηλιάς της Πεντέλης", Δελτίον της Χριστιανικής Αρχαιολογικής Εταιρείας 7 (1973–1974), pp. 79–119 (with English summary, pp. 116–119).
- G. A. Soteriou, "Ἡ σπηληὰ τῆς Πεντέλης", Ἡμερολόγιον τῆς Μεγάλης Ἑλλάδος 6 (1927), pp. 45–59.
- J. Travlos, Bildlexikon zur Topographie des antiken Attika, Tübingen, 1988, pp. 329–331, s.v. Penteli.
- P. Zoridis, "Η σπιλιά των Νυμφών της Πεντέλης", Αρχαιολογική Εφημερίς 1977, Χρόνικα, pp. 4–11.
