= Michail Anagnostakos =

Greek Army officer

Lieutenant Michail Anagnostakos
- Μιχαήλ Αναγνωστάκος
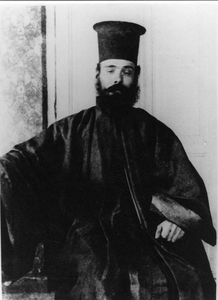
- Anagnostakos disguised as a monk c. 1905
- Born: c. 1878; Charia, Kingdom of Greece
- Died: 19–21 June 1913; Lachanas, Salonika Vilayet, Ottoman Empire (now Greece)
- Education: University of Athens
- Military career
- Allegiance: Kingdom of Greece
- Branch: Hellenic Army
- Rank: Lieutenant
- Nicknames: Kapetan Matapas; Καπετάν Ματαπάς
- Unit: 7th Infantry Division
- Conflicts: Macedonian Struggle; Balkan Wars; First Balkan War; Liberation of Katerini; Second Balkan War; Battle of Kilkis-Lachanas †

Michail Anagnostakos (Greek: Μιχαήλ Αναγνωστάκος; 1878–1913), better known under the nom de guerre Kapetan Matapas (Greek: Καπετάν Ματαπάς) was a Hellenic Army officer and chieftain of the Macedonian Struggle.

== Biography ==
Anagnostakos was born in 1878 in Charia near Areopoli in the Mani Peninsula. He studied at the School of Philosophy at the University of Athens. At the same time he followed a military career having in 1905 the rank of ensign of artillery.

During the spring of 1905 he went to Macedonia as leader to a small armed group of 15 men that would be responsible for the area of Langadas. Anagnostakos and his men disembarked from a sailboat at Potidaia in Chalkidiki on 22 April 1905.

Anagnostakos' force settled in the area of Melissochori with the objective of controlling the route between Thessaloniki and Gevgeli and also to face the agents of the Bulgarian revolutionary committee in the area. However this band failed to make any important operations because Anagnostakos injured his leg and settled temporarily in the monastery of Archangelos in Goumenissa pretending to be a monk.

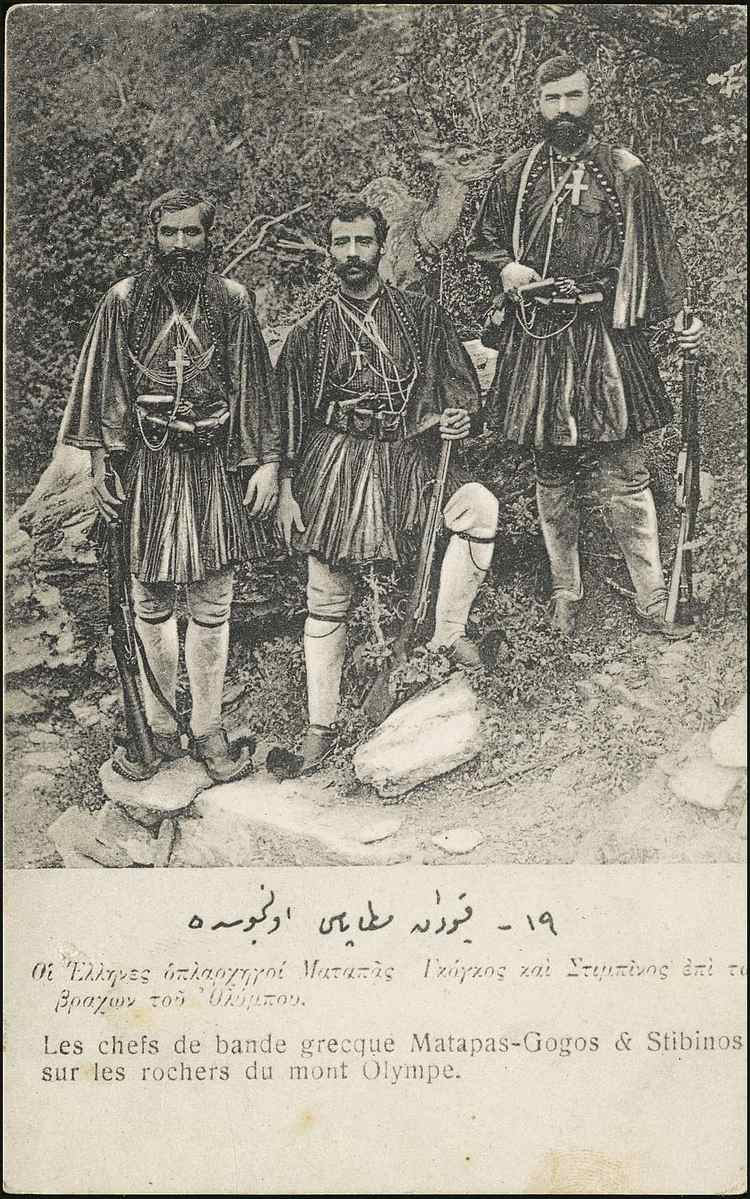
Michail Anagnostakos (centre), featured with Georgios Thomopoulos (left) and Nikolaos Strempinos (right) during the Macedonian Struggle.

From December 1905 until February 1906 Anagnostakos acted as an agent in the areas of Goumenissa and Almopia. From March to October 1906 he was in Giannitsa Lake as deputy chief of an armed band, having his base at a hut in Trichovitsa. During the summer of 1906 he took part in the attack that led to the death of the Bulgarian komitadji Stergios Vlachos. At the end of the year, he took charge of an armed band in Mount Olympus. and managed, until his retirement from Macedonia in October 1907, to conduct significant strikes against Bulgarian and Romanian agents in the areas of Olympus and Pieria, while defeating many local bandits.

Although after the end of the Macedonian Struggle Anagnostakos retired due to his bad health because of the hardships and privations he suffered, he returned voluntarily to the army during the Balkan Wars as a lieutenant. He became chief of scouts in Pieria, along with Alexandros Zannas, and he caused the commander of the 7th Infantry Division, Kleomenis Kleomenous, to expedite the liberation of Katerini, which happened on 16 October 1912.

He was killed in June 1913 during the Battle of Lachanas.

== Bibliography ==
- Παύλος Λ. Τσάμης, Μακεδονικός Αγών, ΕΜΣ, Θεσσαλονίκη 1975.
- Συλλογικό έργο, Μουσείο Μακεδονικού Αγώνα 13 - Η ελληνική αντεπίθεση στη Μακεδονία (1905-1906) - 100 έγγραφα από το αρχείο του Υπουργείου Εξωτερικών της Ελλάδος, Μουσείο Μακεδονικού Αγώνα, Θεσσαλονίκη 1997.
