= Pierioi =

Pierioi Πιέριοι
- Municipal unit
- Location within the regional unit

- Location within Greece
- Coordinates: 40°17′N 22°17′E
- Country: Greece
- Administrative region: Central Macedonia
- Regional unit: Pieria
- Municipality: Katerini

Area
  - Municipal unit: 112.943 km^{2} (43.608 sq mi)

Population (2021)
  - Municipal unit: 1,656
  - Municipal unit density: 14.66/km^{2} (37.98/sq mi)
- Time zone: UTC+2 (EET)
  - Summer (DST): UTC+3 (EEST)
- Postal code: 601 50
- Area code: +30-2351
- Vehicle registration: KN

Pierioi (Greek: Πιέριοι) is a former municipality in Pieria, Greece. The seat of the municipality was in Ritini. Since the 2011 local government reform it is part of the municipality Katerini, of which it is a municipal unit. The 2021 census recorded 1,656 residents in the municipal unit. The municipal unit has an area of 112.943 km^{2}.
