= Parnassos Ski Centre =

Coordinates: 38.55°N 22.59°E

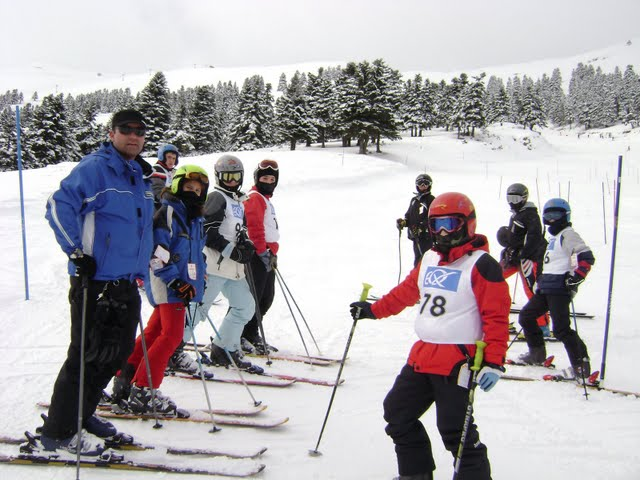
Skiers in Parnasos.

Parnassos Ski Centre is an alpine ski centre in Greece, located at Mount Parnassus near Delphi. It has two main areas, Kelaria and Fterrolakas, and consists of 19 ski runs with a total length of 36 km (22 mi), the longest at 4 km (2.5 mi). Northwest of Athens, its highest elevation is 2,250 m (7,380 ft) and the base is at 1,600 m (5,250 ft). The ski resort is 180 km (110 mi) from Athens and 205 km (127 mi) from the airport. Together with Kalavryta Ski Centre, it is the ski centre that is closest to Athens.

The centre does not provide accommodation facilities; the nearest places to stay are Kalyvia, Arachova, Lilaia (or Kato Agoriani), Eptalofos (or Agoriani), and Amfikleia, which are 20 to 45 minutes away by vehicle. The centre provides equipment hire facilities as well as several restaurants and bars.
