= Ritini =

Ritini Ρητίνη
- Community
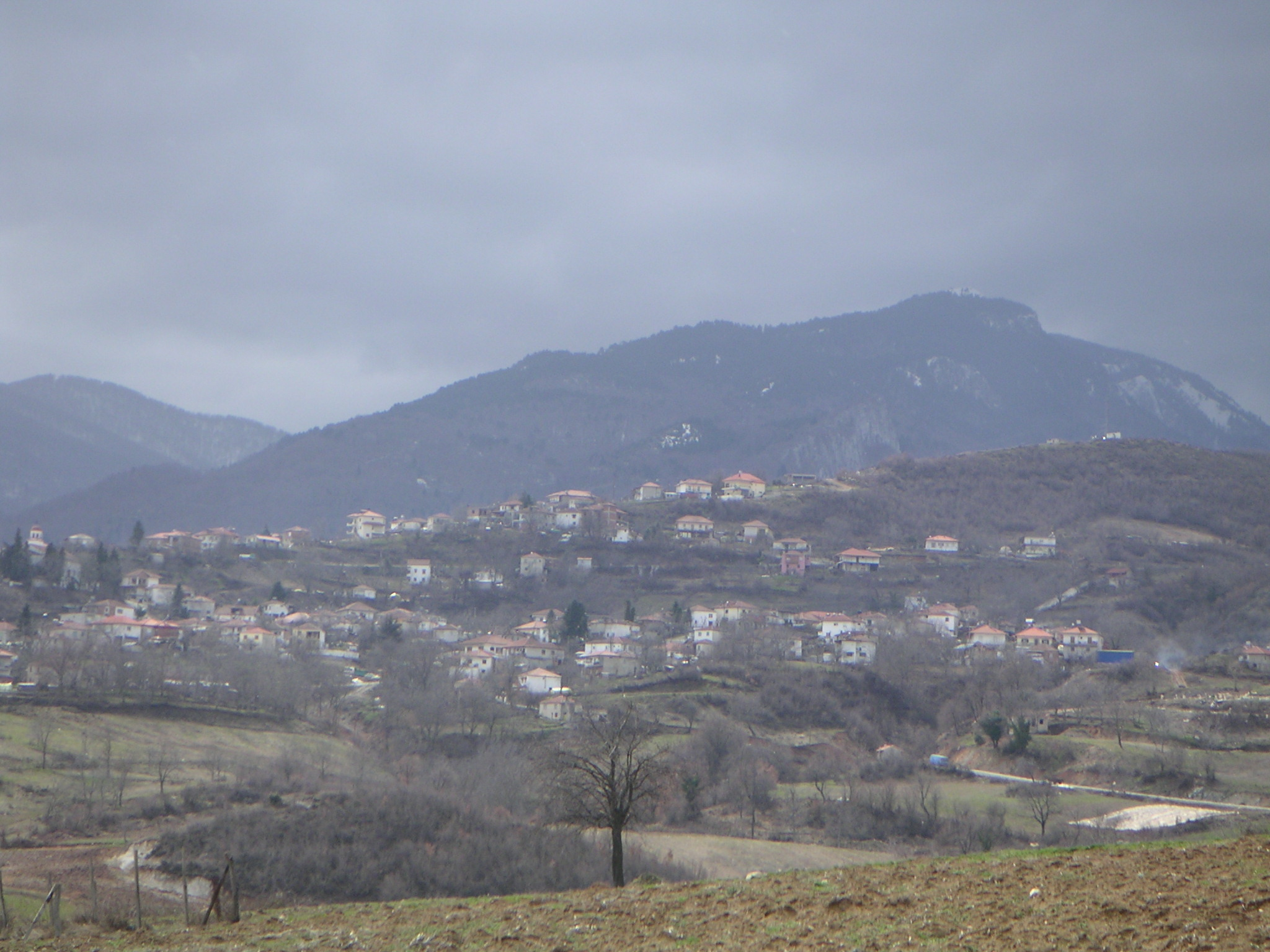
- View of Ritini

- Location within Greece
- Coordinates: 40°17.5′N 22°17′E
- Country: Greece
- Administrative region: Central Macedonia
- Regional unit: Pieria
- Municipality: Katerini
- Municipal unit: Pierioi
- Elevation: 550 m (1,800 ft)

Population (2021)
  - Community: 890
- Time zone: UTC+2 (EET)
  - Summer (DST): UTC+3 (EEST)
- Postal code: 601 00
- Area code: +30-2351
- Vehicle registration: KN

Ritini (Greek: Ρητίνη) is a village and a community of the Katerini municipality. Before the 2011 local government reform, it was part of the municipality of Pierioi, of which it was the seat. The 2021 census recorded 890 inhabitants in the village.
