= Arachova =

Town in Boeotia, Greece

Arachova Αράχωβα
- Municipal unit
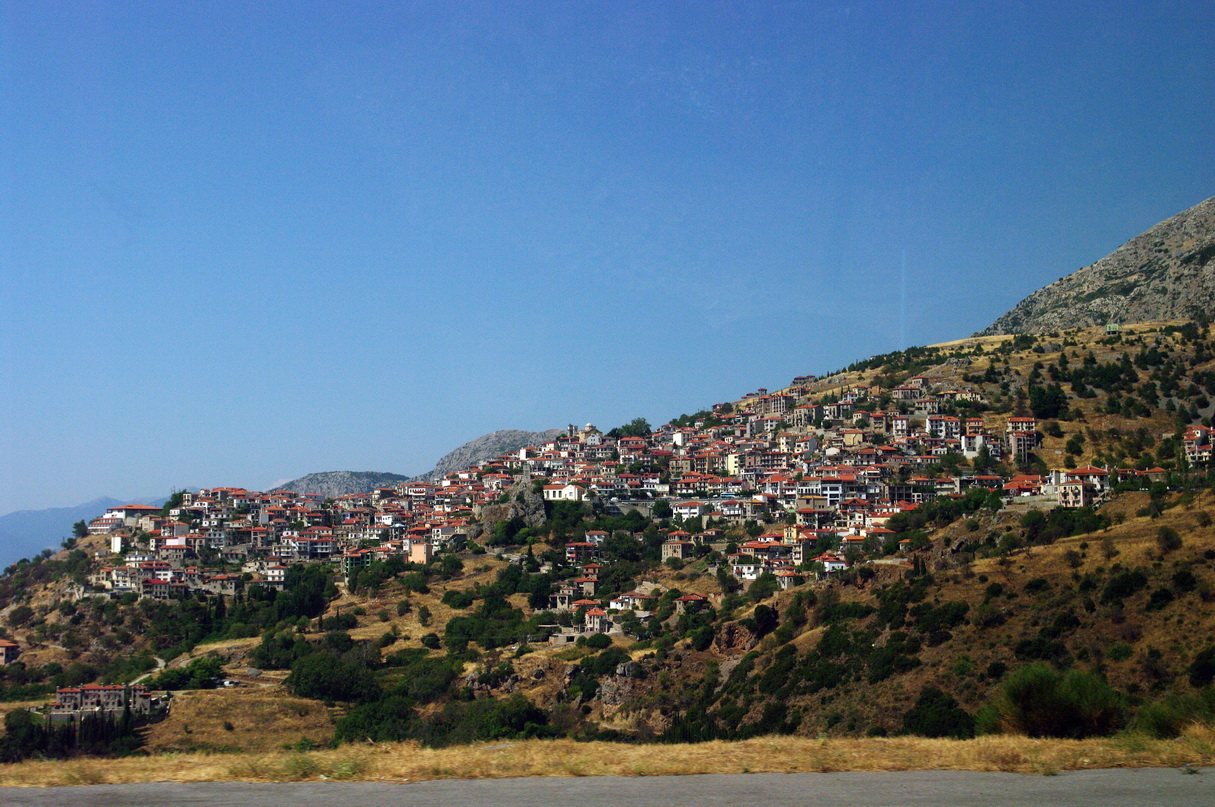
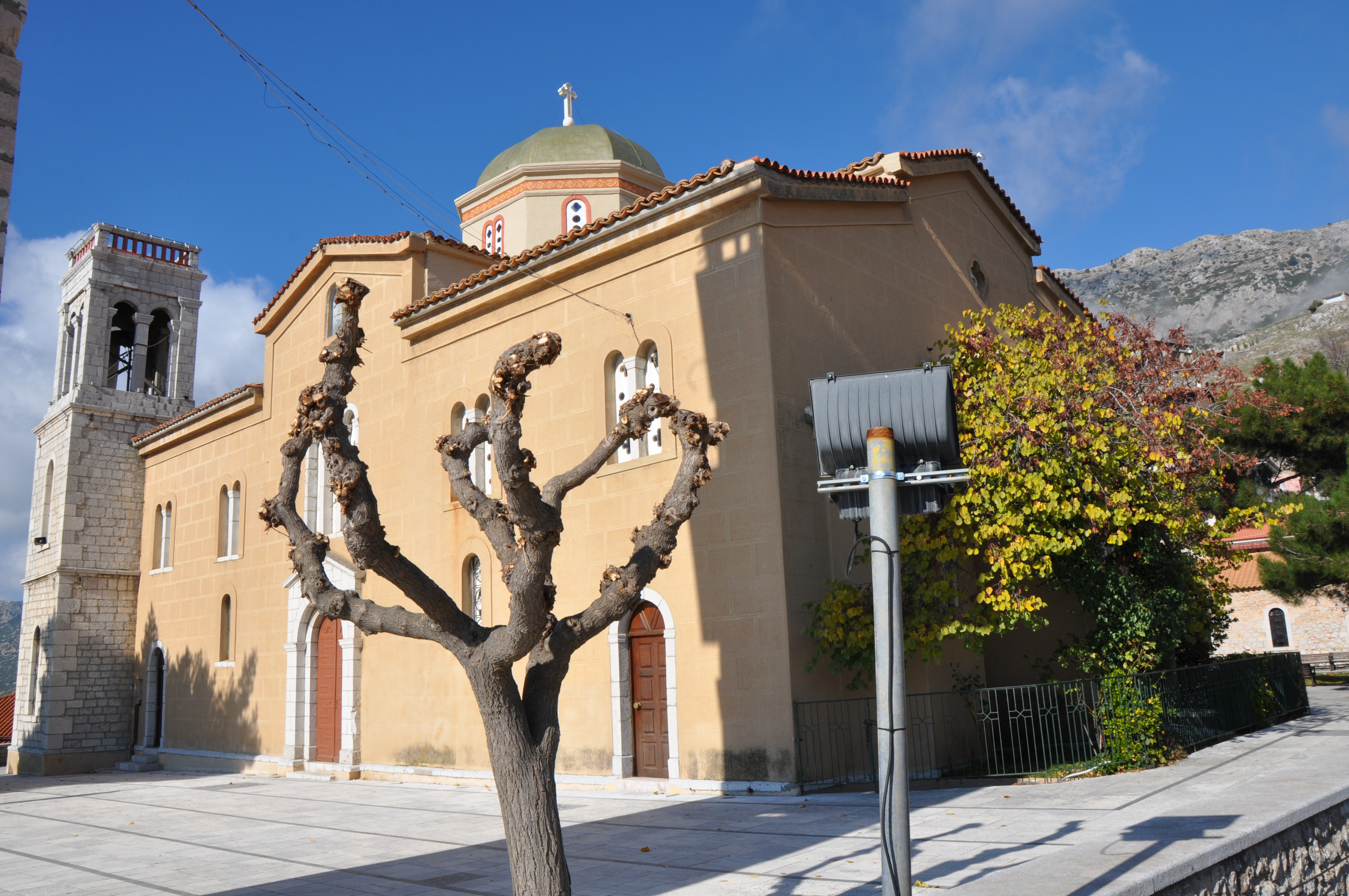
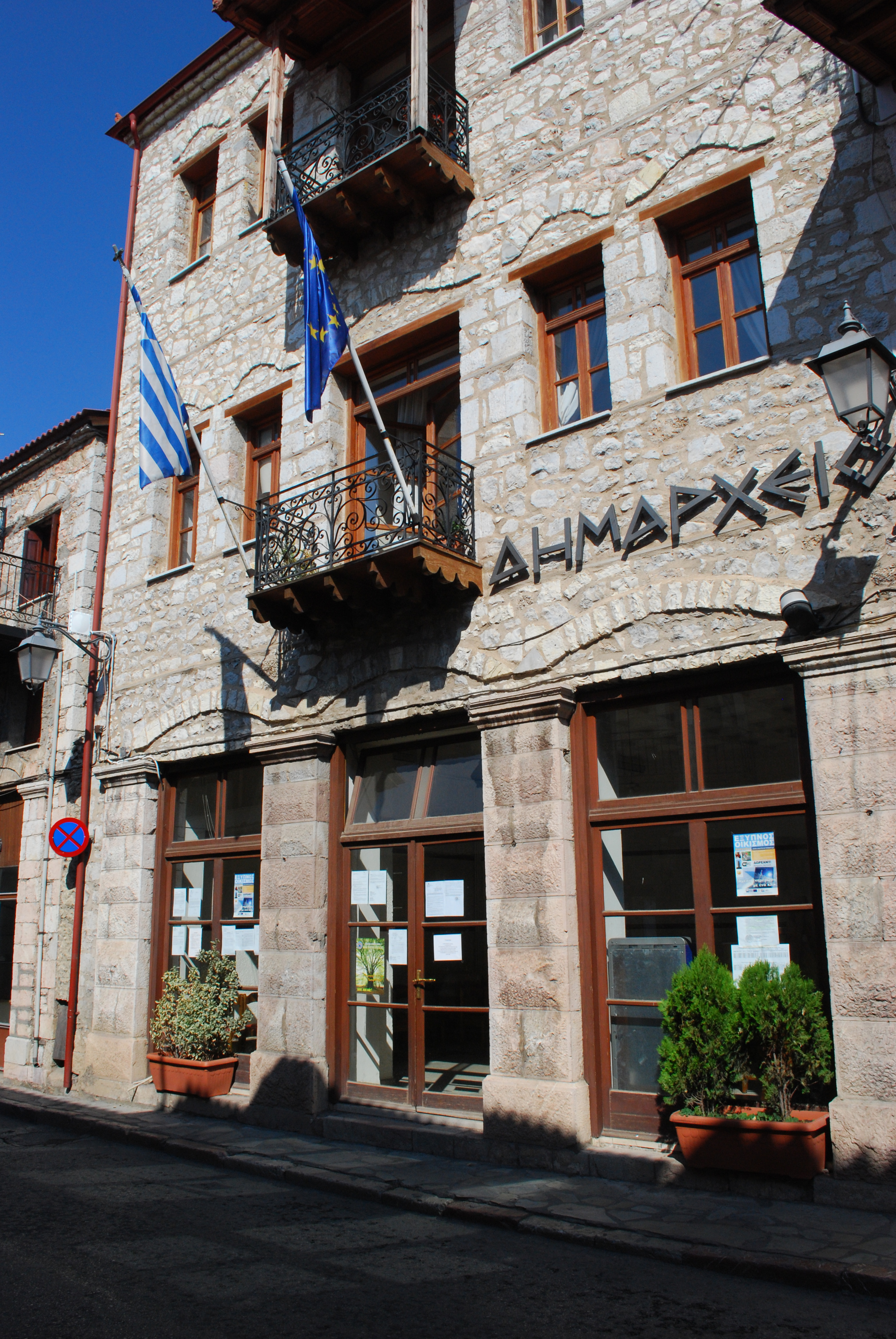
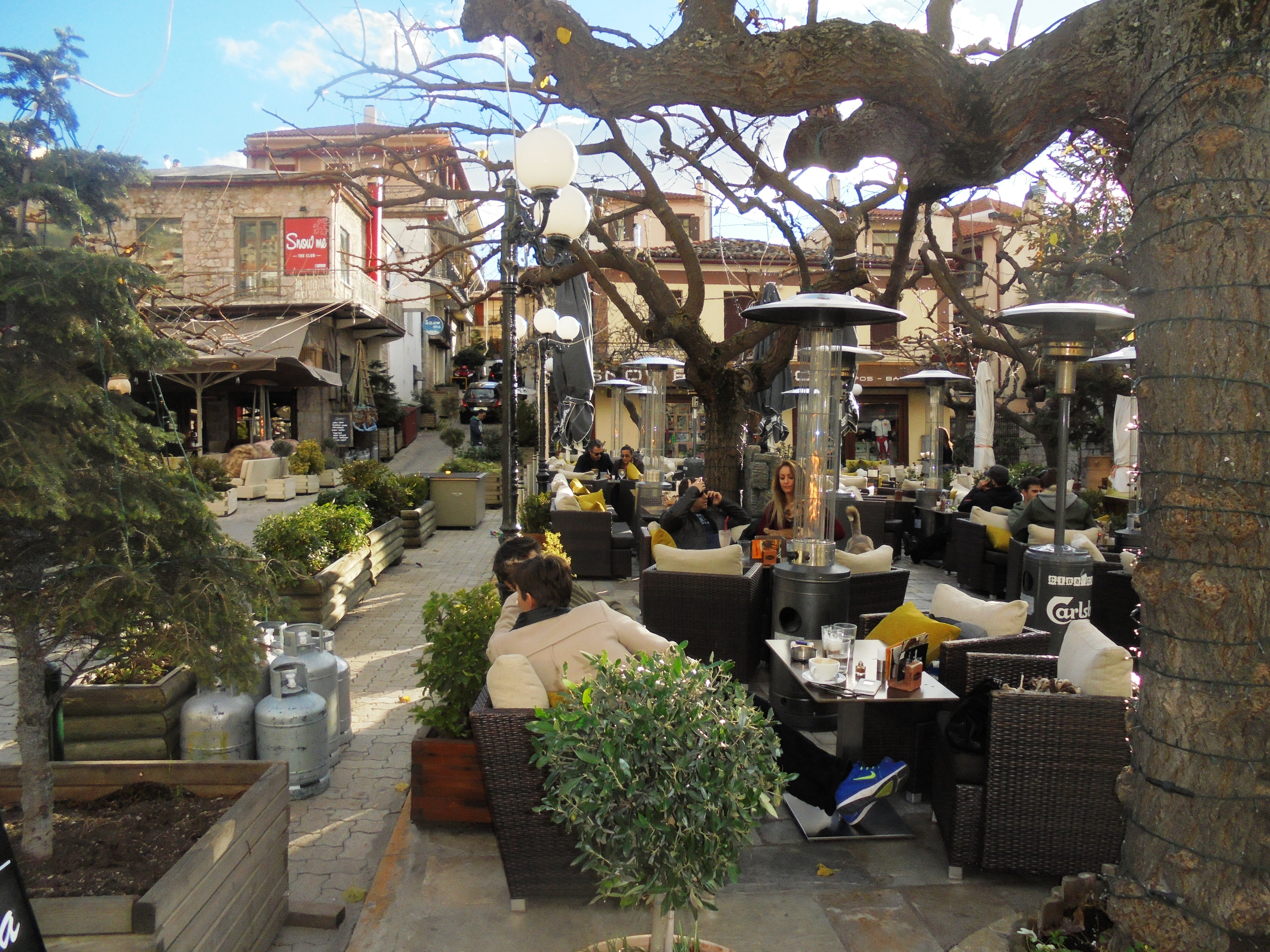
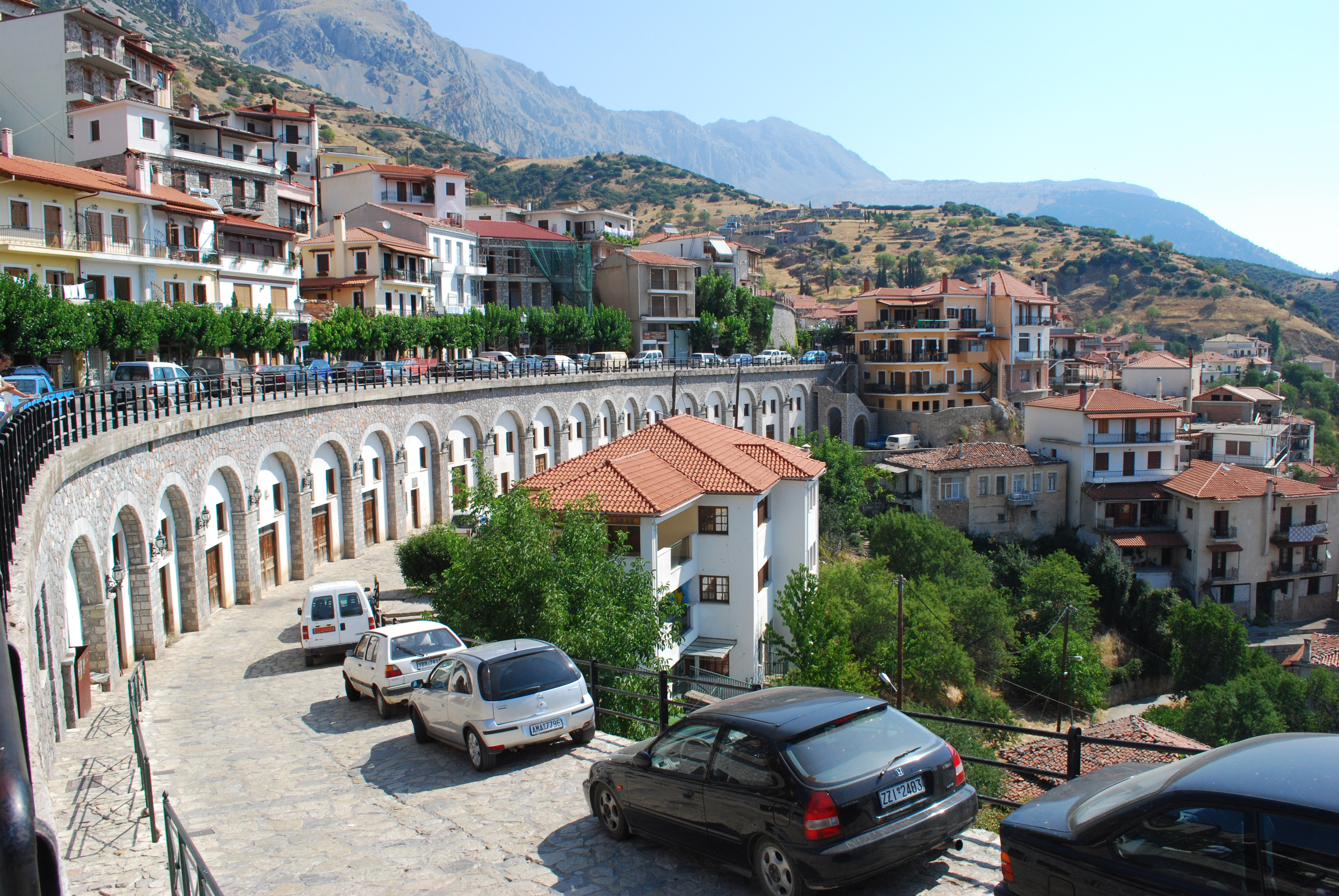
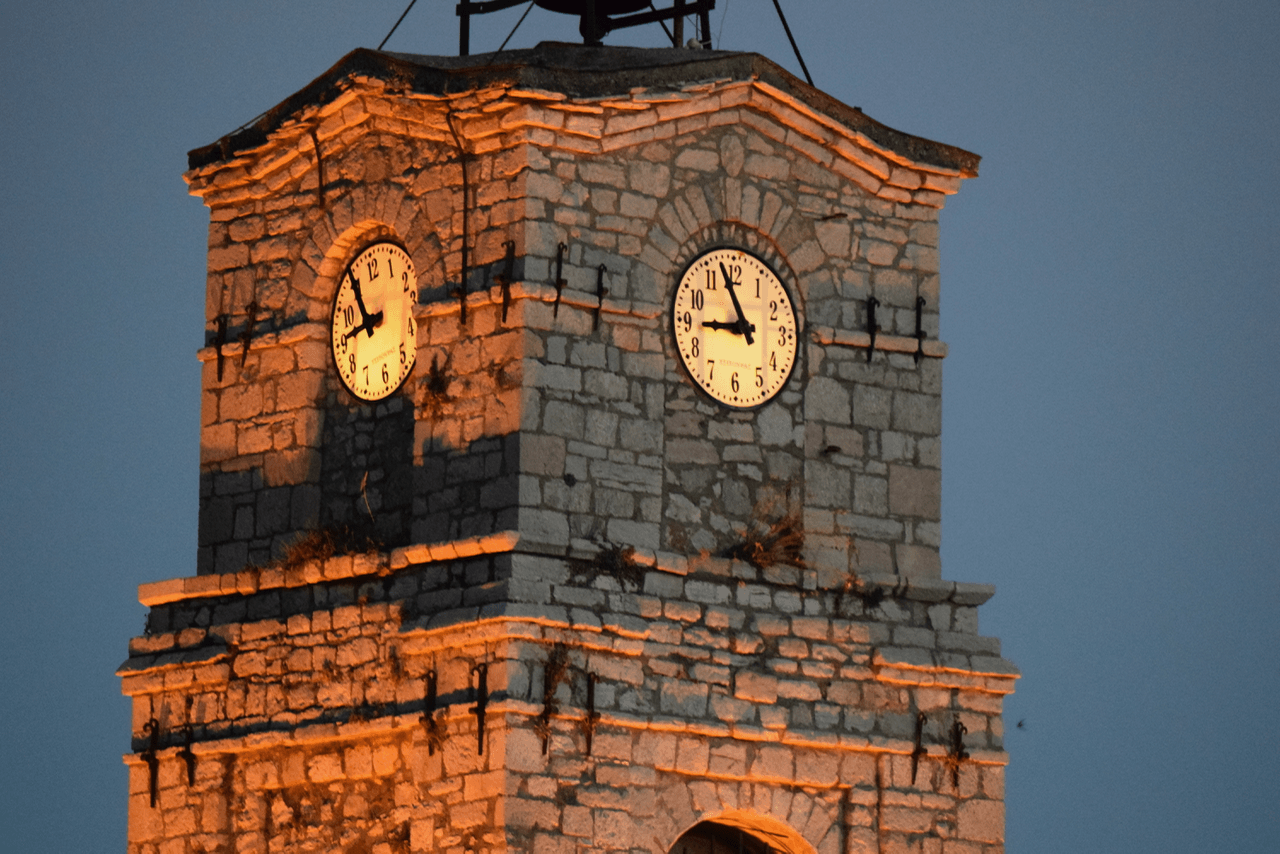
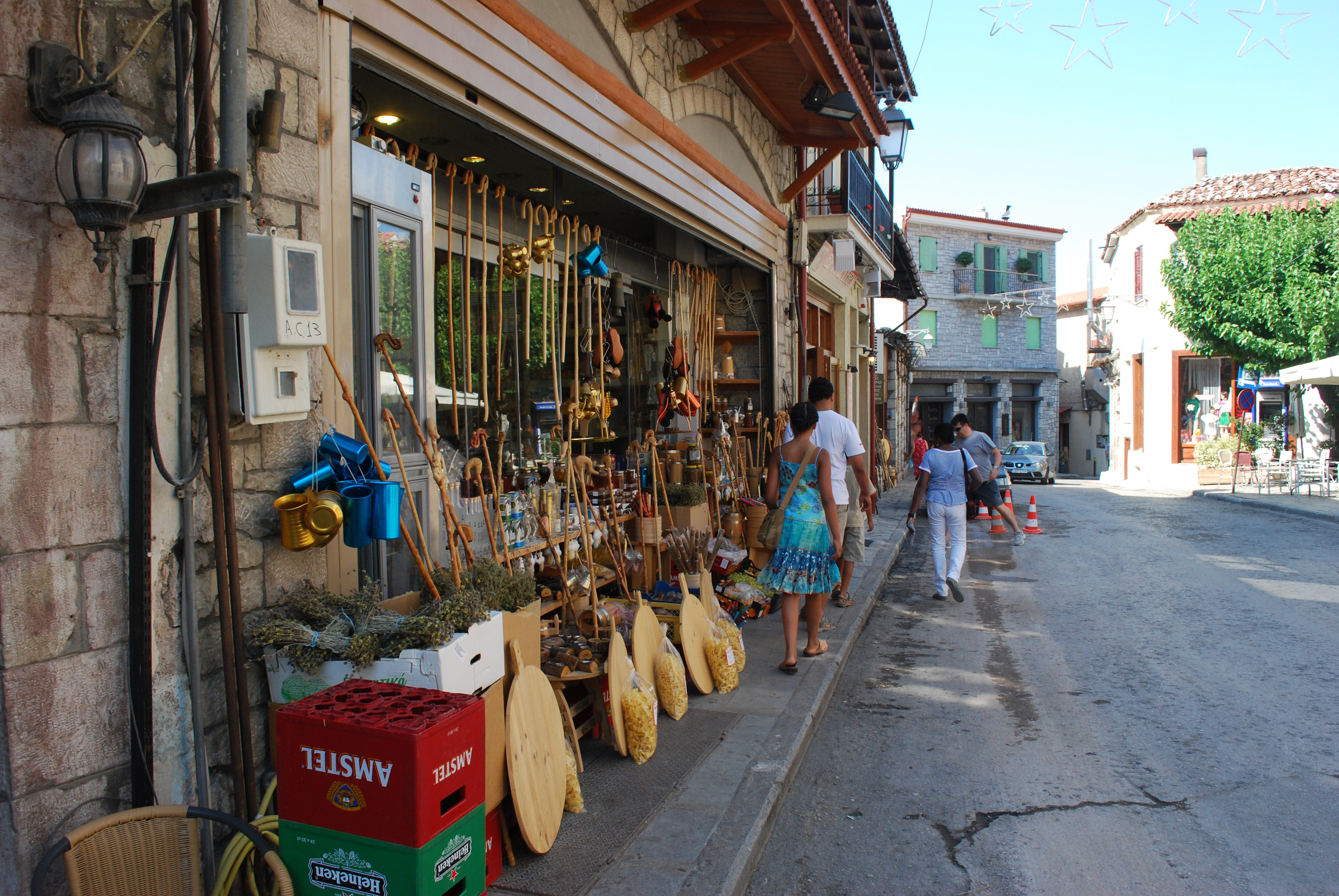
- Clockwise from top: View of Arachova, Arachova Town Hall, view of the center, a street in Arachova, Arachova Clock Tower, Arachova Square, Church of Agios Georgios

- Location within the regional unit

- Location within Greece
- Coordinates: 38°29′N 22°35′E
- Country: Greece
- Administrative region: Central Greece
- Regional unit: Boeotia
- Municipality: Distomo-Arachova-Antikyra

Area
  - Municipal unit: 139.45 km^{2} (53.84 sq mi)
- Elevation: 968 m (3,176 ft)

Population (2021)
  - Municipal unit: 2,439
  - Municipal unit density: 17.49/km^{2} (45.30/sq mi)
- Time zone: UTC+2 (EET)
  - Summer (DST): UTC+3 (EEST)
- Postal code: 320 04
- Area code: 22670
- Vehicle registration: ΒΙ
- Website: arachova.com

Arachova (Greek: Αράχωβα, also Αράχοβα) is a mountain town and a former municipality in the western part of Boeotia. Since the 2011 local government reform it is a municipal unit, part of the municipality Distomo-Arachova-Antikyra. It is a tourist destination due to its location in the mountains, its traditions and its proximity to the town of Delphi. The town is a popular day or weekend trip destination from Attica and a gathering place for the rich and famous. This is not to be confused with Caryae (also spelled Karye) which is a town in the Southern Peleponnese that used to be called Arachova.

Greek rebels under Georgios Karaiskakis defeated the Ottomans at the 1826 Battle of Arachova.

The Formaela cheese from Arachova has been designated as a protected designation of origin. Nearby Arachova, modern ski facilities are popular with visitors. Although contemporary culture tends to outdo regional folklore, the town maintains some local customs and demonstrates them at celebrations on 23 April, in the honor of the patron Saint George.

Arachova has a panoramic view, uphill small houses and the cobbled streets show a picturesque architecture. The town center includes a huge and steep cliff, the Bell Tower, covered with dense ivy. At the top of the tower is a large 10m height clock. Arachova is famous for its black wine, its "brusque", the colorful textiles, carpets and rugs, handicrafts and woodcut creations as well.

== Geography ==
Arachova is situated at about a 970 m (3182 ft) elevation on the southern slope of Mount Parnassus, above the valley of the river Pleistos. The municipal unit has an area of 139.448 km^{2}. Arachova is located 8 km E of Delphi, 9 km northwest of Distomo, 18 km southeast of Amfissa and 26 km west of Livadeia. The Greek National Road 48 (Naupactus - Delphi - Livadeia) passes through the town. The Parnassos Ski Centre is situated to the north.

== Climate ==
Arachova has a temperate climate. Snow falls in winter, though its sheltered location means that it receives less snow than areas at similar altitudes on the north side of Parnassos mountain. Summers are warm with pleasant nights.

Climate data for Arachova (1.069m)
Month	Jan	Feb	Mar	Apr	May	Jun	Jul	Aug	Sep	Oct	Nov	Dec	Year
Mean daily maximum °C (°F)	5.9 (42.6)	8.4 (47.1)	11.5 (52.7)	13.5 (56.3)	19.8 (67.6)	24.2 (75.6)	26.7 (80.1)	27.5 (81.5)	23.8 (74.8)	19.3 (66.7)	13 (55)	9.2 (48.6)	16.9 (62.4)
Mean daily minimum °C (°F)	0.2 (32.4)	2 (36)	4.6 (40.3)	6.4 (43.5)	11.2 (52.2)	15.5 (59.9)	18 (64)	18.7 (65.7)	15.5 (59.9)	12.3 (54.1)	7.5 (45.5)	4.7 (40.5)	9.7 (49.5)
Average precipitation mm (inches)	129.4 (5.09)	62.1 (2.44)	75.3 (2.96)	62.6 (2.46)	32.4 (1.28)	35.8 (1.41)	44.3 (1.74)	36.3 (1.43)	75.2 (2.96)	56.2 (2.21)	97.3 (3.83)	125.6 (4.94)	832.5 (32.75)
Source: http://penteli.meteo.gr/stations/arahova/ (2019 – 2020 averages)

== Historical population ==
Year	Population
1981	2,910
1991	3,084
2001	4,158
2011	2,770
2021	2,439

== Notable people ==
- Loukas Papaioannou (1831-1890), medical doctor and professor

== Gallery ==
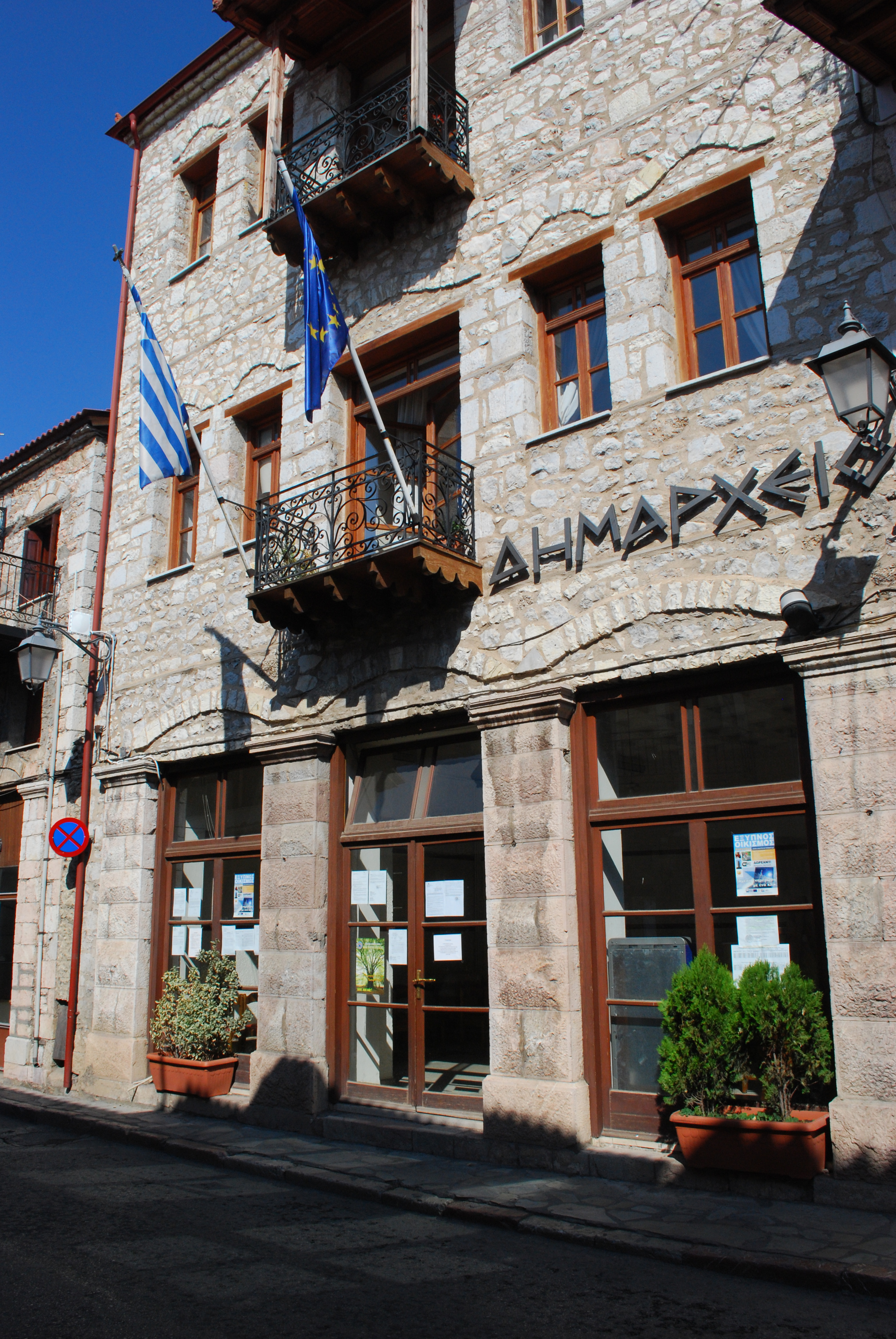
View of the town hall

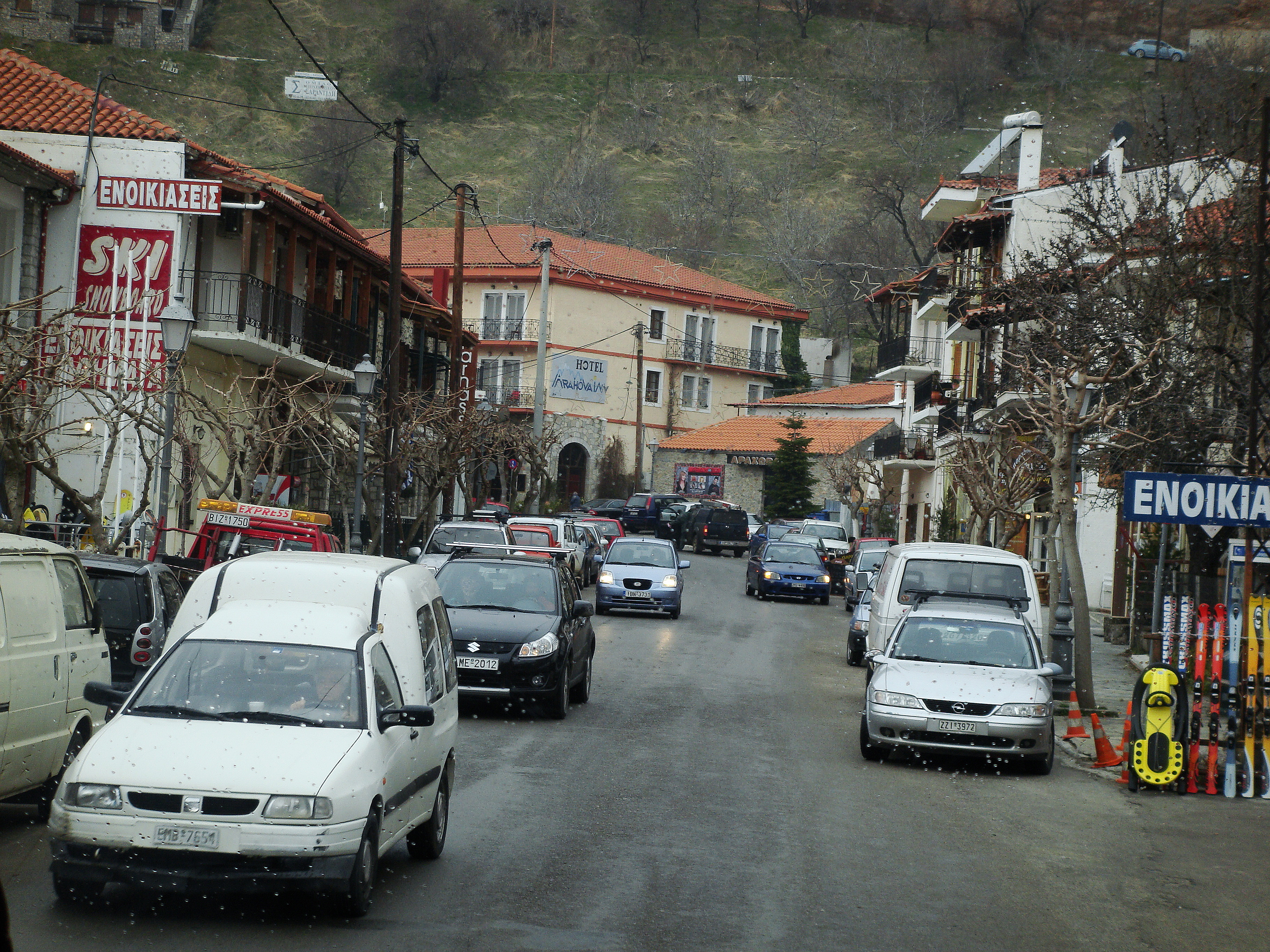
A street in Arachova

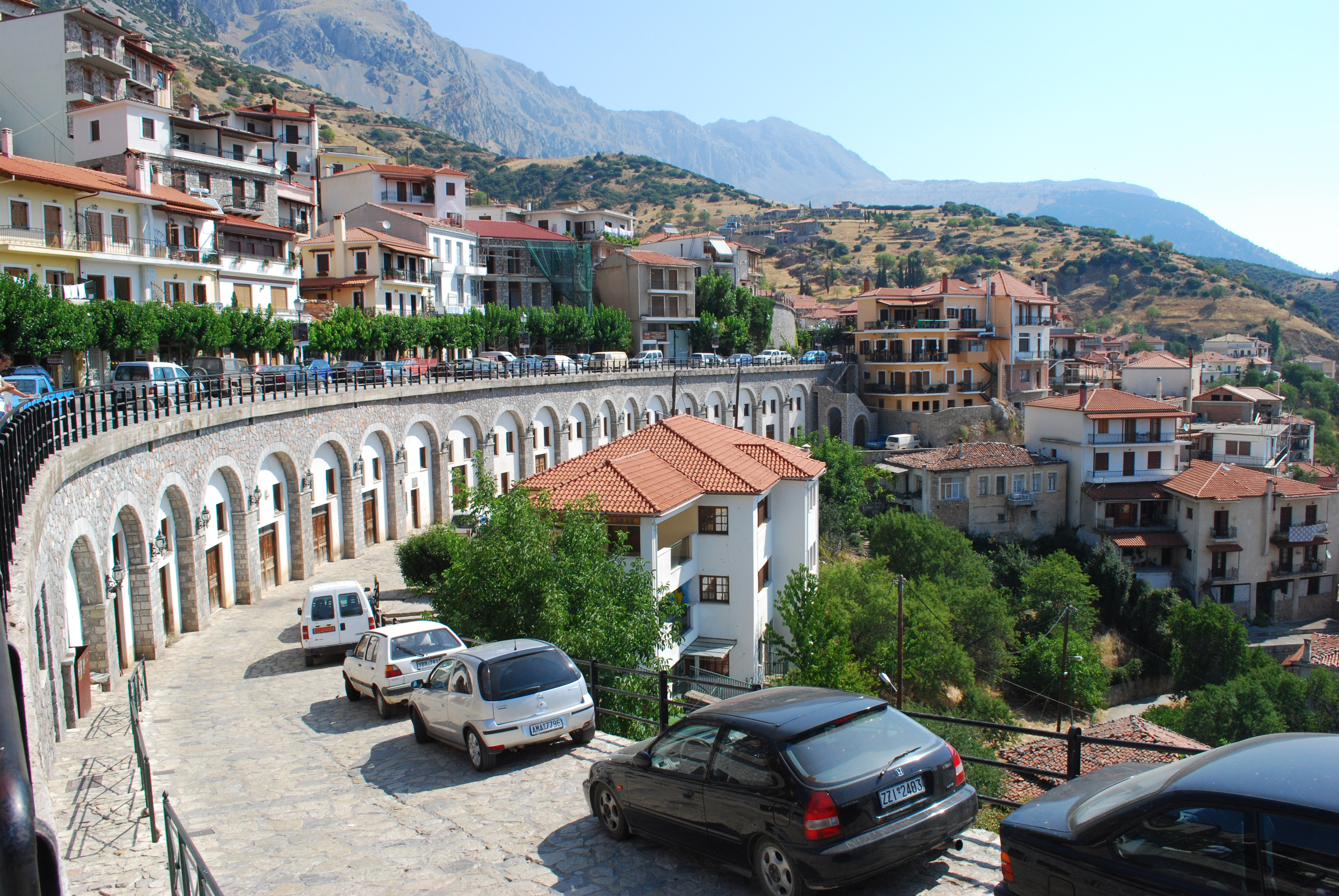
View of Arachova

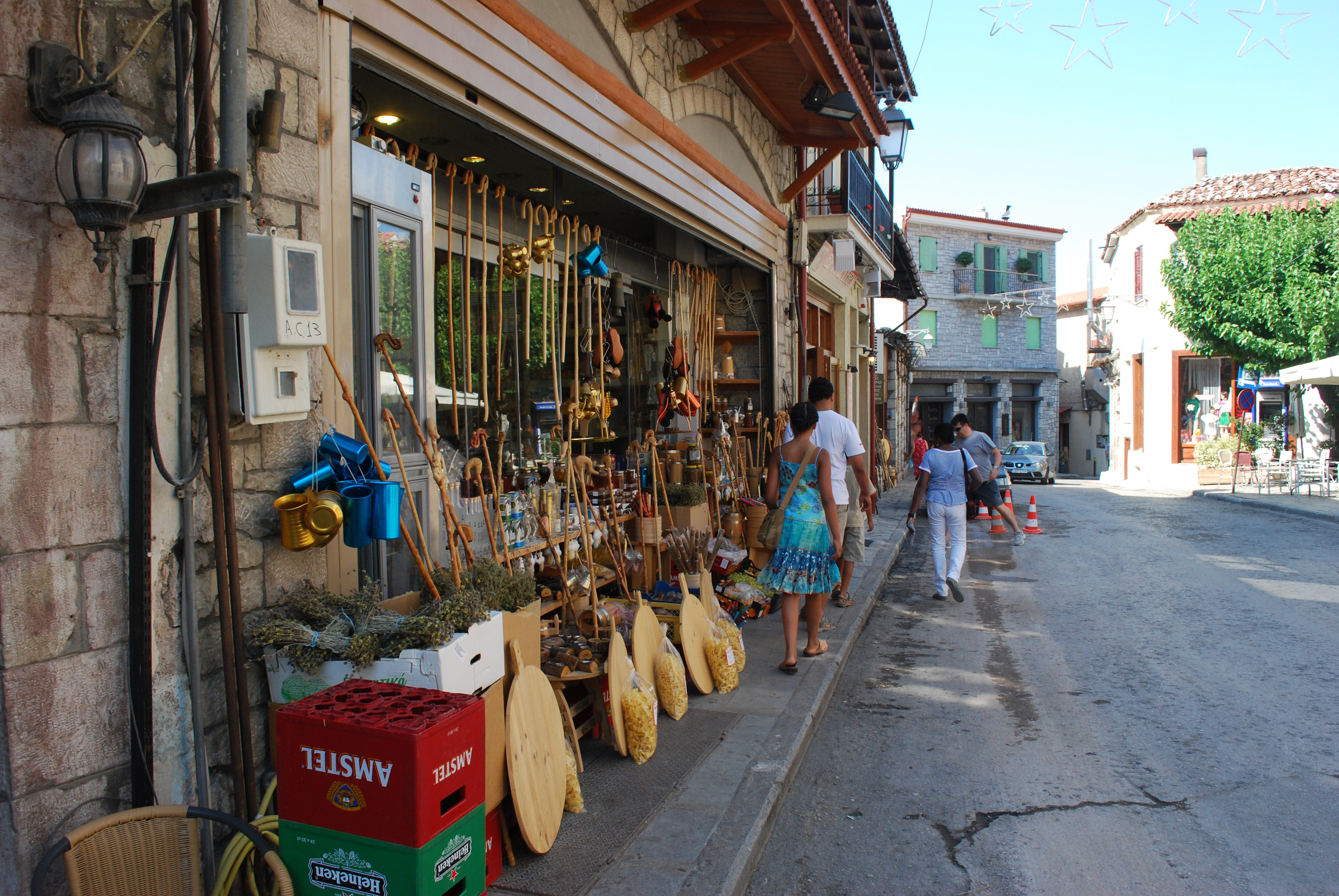
Another street of the city

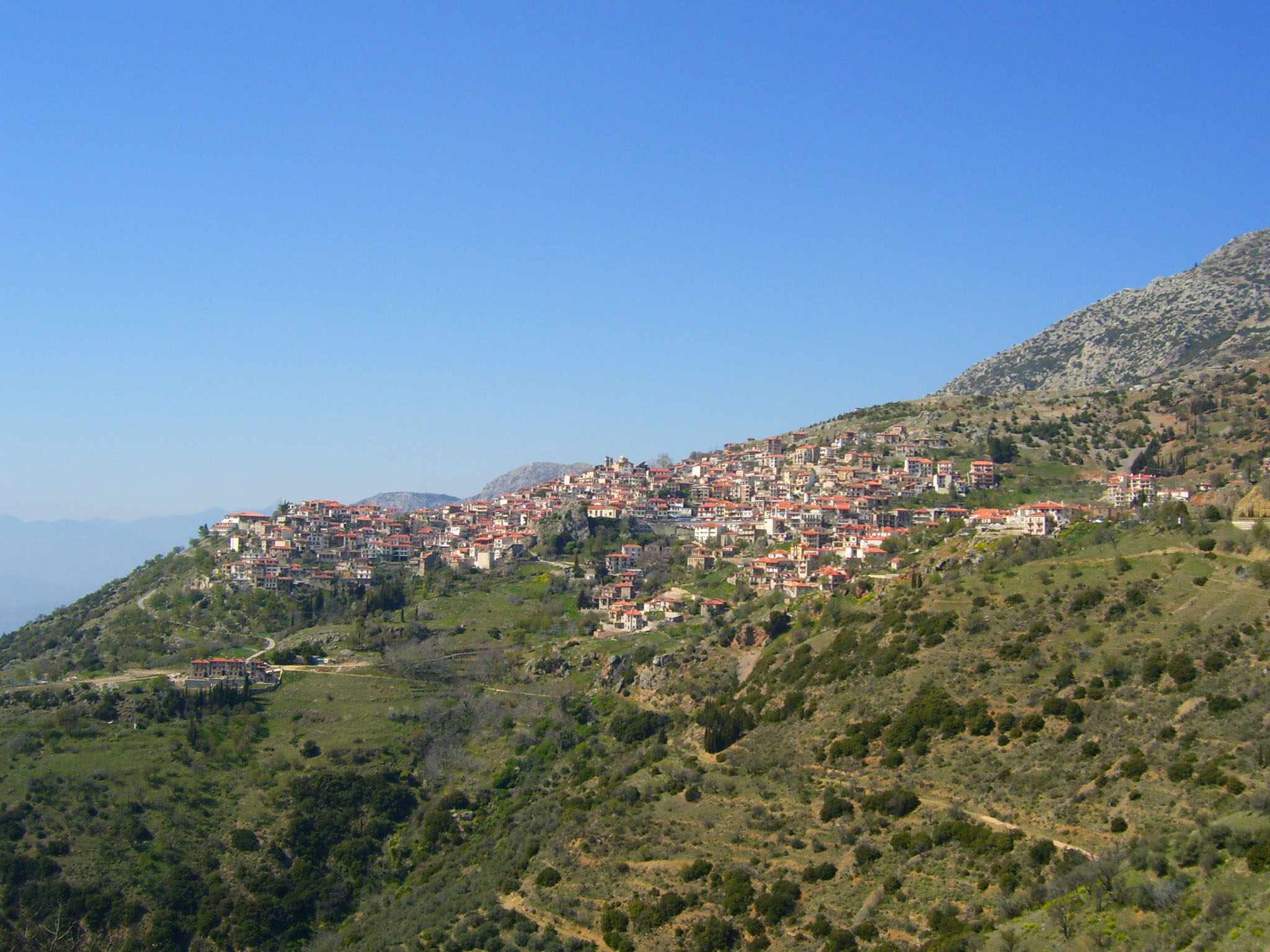
Arachova Viewpoint

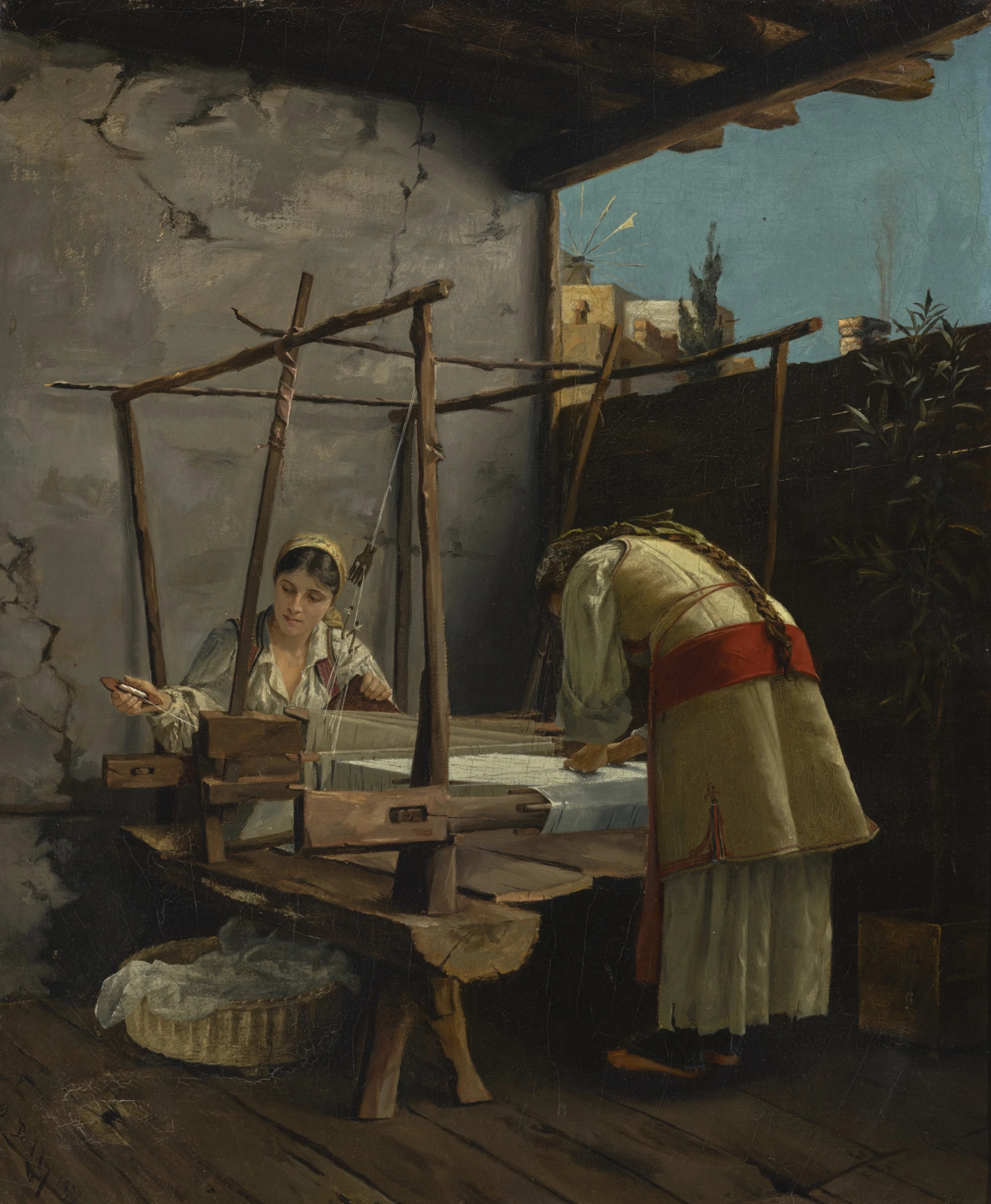
Weavers in Arachova in 1877, by Théodore Jacques Ralli

== See also ==
- List of settlements in Boeotia
