= North Macedonia =

Country in Southeastern Europe

Republic of North Macedonia Република Северна Македонија (Macedonian) Republika e Maqedonisë së Veriut (Albanian)
- Flag National emblem
- Anthem: Денес над Македонија (Macedonian) "Today over Macedonia"
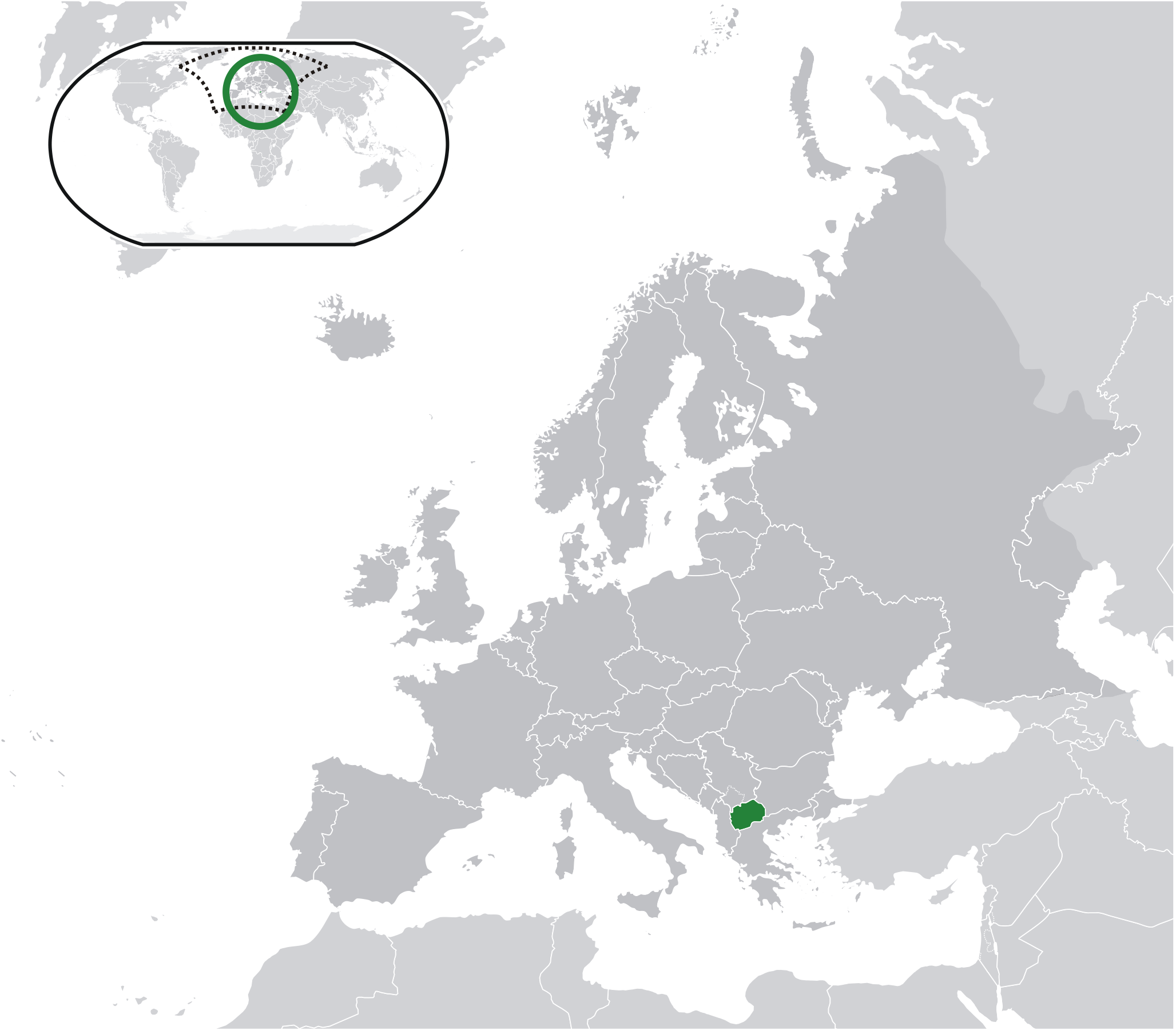
- Location of North Macedonia (green) in Europe (dark grey) – [Legend]
- Capital and largest city: Skopje; 42°0′N 21°26′E
- Official languages: Macedonian (Note: National and official language in all aspects of the whole territory of the state and in its international relations)
- Co-official: Albanian (Note: Co-official language at a state level (excluding defence, central police and monetary policy) and in local self-government units where speakers are 20% or more)
- Recognized regional: Aromanian; Bosnian; Romani; Serbian; Turkish
- Ethnic groups (2021): 58.4% Macedonians; 24.3% Albanians; 3.9% Turks; 2.5% Roma; 1.3% Serbs; 0.9% Bosniaks; 0.5% Aromanians (including Megleno-Romanians); 1.0% other (including undeclared and unknown); 7.2% persons for whom data are taken from administrative sources
- Religion (2021): 60.4% Christianity; 46.1% Eastern Orthodoxy; 14.3% other Christian; 32.2% Islam; 0.1% no religion; 0.1% other; 7.2% data taken from administrative sources
- Demonym: Macedonian
- Government: Unitary parliamentary republic
  - President: Gordana Siljanovska-Davkova
  - Prime Minister: Hristijan Mickoski
  - Chairman of the Assembly: Afrim Gashi
- Legislature: Assembly

Establishment history
  - Socialist Republic of Macedonia: 2 August 1944
  - Independence referendum: 8 September 1991

Area
  - Total: 25,436 km^{2} (9,821 sq mi) (145th)
  - Water (%): 1.1

Population
  - 2021 census: ▼1,836,713
  - Density: 71.43/km^{2} (185.0/sq mi) (122nd)
- GDP (PPP): 2025 estimate
  - Total: ▲$53.345 billion (134th)
  - Per capita: ▲$29,475 (71st)
- GDP (nominal): 2025 estimate
  - Total: ▲$17.885 billion (137th)
  - Per capita: ▲$9,882 (81st)
- Gini (2022): ▼29.8 low inequality
- HDI (2023): ▲0.815 very high (68th)
- Currency: Macedonian denar (MKD)
- Time zone: UTC+1 (CET)
  - Summer (DST): UTC+2 (CEST)
- Calling code: +389
- ISO 3166 code: MK
- Internet TLD: .mk; .мкд

North Macedonia, (Note: /ˌmæsɪˈdoʊniə/, MASS-ih-DOH-nee-ə, Macedonian: Северна Македонија, romanised: Severna Makedonija, pronounced [ˈsɛvɛrna makɛˈdɔnija]; Albanian: Maqedonia e Veriut, pronounced [macɛˈdɔnja ɛ vɛɾˈjut]) officially the Republic of North Macedonia, (Note: Macedonian: Република Северна Македонија, romanised: Republika Severna Makedonija, pronounced [rɛˈpublika ˈsɛvɛrna makɛˈdɔnija]; Albanian: Republika e Maqedonisë së Veriut, pronounced [rɛˈpublika ɛ macɛˈdɔnis sə vɛɾˈjut]) is a landlocked country in Southeastern Europe. It shares borders with Greece to the south, Albania to the west, Bulgaria to the east, Kosovo (Note: North Macedonia has recognised Kosovo since 9 October 2008.) to the northwest and Serbia to the north. It constitutes approximately the northern third of the larger geographical region of Macedonia. Skopje, the capital and largest city, is home to a quarter of the country's population of over 1.83 million. The majority of the residents are ethnic Macedonians, a South Slavic people. Albanians form a significant minority at around 25%, followed by Turks, Roma, Serbs, Bosniaks, Aromanians and a few other minorities.

In classical antiquity most of present-day North Macedonia corresponded to the ancient regions of Paeonia and Pelagonia. In the late-6th century BC, most of the area was subjugated by the Persian Empire and then incorporated into the kingdom of Macedonia by the mid-4th century BC. Rome conquered the region by the mid-2nd century BC and made it part of its larger province of Macedonia. The area remained part of the Byzantine Empire but was often raided and settled by Slavic tribes beginning in the 6th century AD. Following centuries of contention between the Byzantine and Bulgarian empires, it became part of the Serbian Empire in the mid-14th century, and then it was part of the Ottoman Empire from the late-14th century until the Balkan Wars (1912–1913), when it came under Serbian rule.

During the First World War, the territory was ruled by Bulgaria. After the end of the war, it returned to Serbian rule as part of the newly formed Kingdom of Serbs, Croats and Slovenes. During the Second World War, it was again ruled by Bulgaria; and in 1945 it was established as a constituent state of communist Yugoslavia, which it remained until its peaceful secession in 1991. The country became a member of the United Nations (UN) in 1993.

North Macedonia is a member of NATO, the Council of Europe, the World Bank, OSCE, CEFTA, BSEC and the WTO. Since 2005, it has been a candidate for joining the European Union. It is an upper-middle-income country by the World Bank's definitions and has undergone considerable economic reform since its independence in developing an open economy. It is a developing country, ranking 68th on the Human Development Index, with low income inequality. The country provides social security, a universal health care system as well as free primary and secondary education to its citizens.

== Etymology ==
The name derives from the Greek word Μακεδονία (Makedonía), a kingdom—and later a region—named after the ancient Macedonians. Their name, Μακεδόνες (Makedónes), ultimately derives from the ancient Greek adjective μακεδνός (makednós), meaning 'tall' or 'taper', which shares the same root as the adjective μακρός (makrós, 'long, tall, high') in ancient Greek. The name is believed to have originally meant either 'highlanders' or 'the tall ones', possibly descriptive of the people. According to linguist Robert S. P. Beekes, both terms are of pre-Greek substrate origin and cannot be explained in terms of Indo-European morphology. According to linguist Filip De Decker, Beekes's arguments are insufficiently supported.

Apart from the Byzantine theme of Macedonia, the name "Macedonia" was largely forgotten as a geographical denomination through the Byzantine and Ottoman eras but was revived by Bulgarian and Greek nationalist movements from the early 19th century onwards. It was revived in middle of the century, with the rise of nationalism in the Ottoman Empire. In the early 20th century the region was already a national cause, contested among Bulgarian, Greek, and Serbian nationalists. During the interwar period the use of "Macedonia" was prohibited in the Kingdom of Yugoslavia because of the implemented policy of Serbianisation of the local Slavic-speakers. "Macedonia" was adopted officially for the first time at the end of the Second World War by the Socialist Republic of Macedonia, which became one of the six constituent countries of the Socialist Federal Republic of Yugoslavia. After the breakup of Yugoslavia, the federal entity declared independence and proclaimed as its official name the "Republic of Macedonia" in 1991.

Following the Prespa Agreement the country changed its name to the "Republic of North Macedonia" in 2019. A non-binding national referendum on the matter passed with 90% approval but did not reach the required 50% turnout amidst a boycott, leaving the final decision with parliament to ratify the result. The vote to amend the constitution and change the name of the country passed on 11 January 2019 in favour of the amendment. Many citizens and local media outlets unofficially refer to the country as "Macedonia".

== History ==
=== Ancient period ===
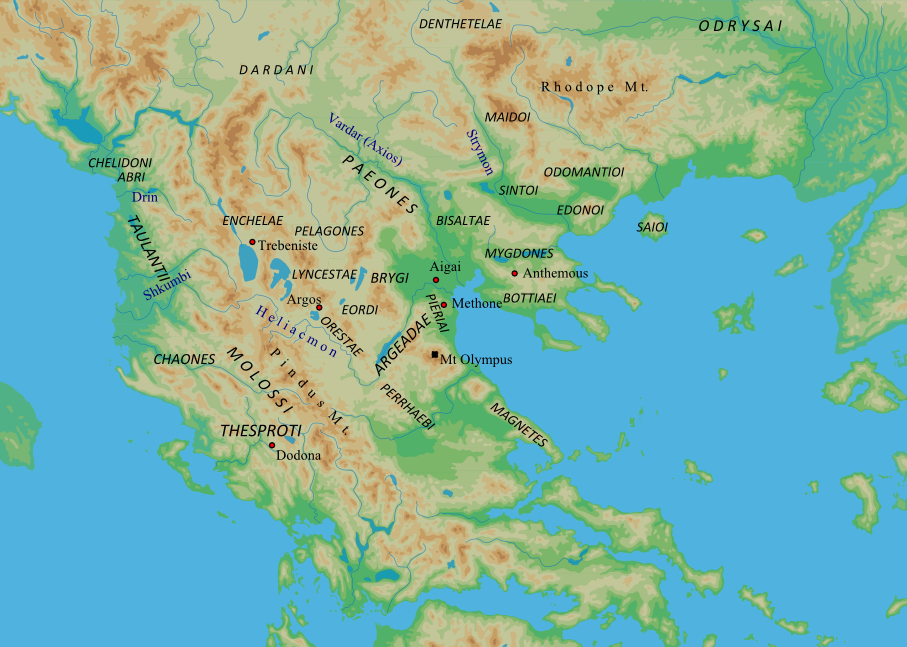
Tribal ethnes in the Southern Balkans prior to the expansion of Macedon

North Macedonia geographically roughly corresponds to the ancient kingdom of Paeonia, which was located immediately north of the ancient kingdom of Macedonia. In early times, the chief town and seat of the Paeonian kings was Bylazora (in modern Sveti Nikole) on the Vardar; later, the seat of the kings was moved to Stobi (near modern Gradsko). Paeonia was inhabited by the Paeonians, whilst the northwest was inhabited by the Illyrian Dardani and the southwest by the Enchelae (also an Illyrian tribe), as well as Pelagones and Lyncestae of Upper Macedonia (generally regarded as Molossian tribes of the northwestern Greek group).

In the late 6th century BC, the Achaemenid Persians under Darius the Great conquered Paeonia, incorporating the area within their vast territories. Following their defeat in the Second Persian invasion of Greece in 479 BC, the Persians withdrew from their European territories.

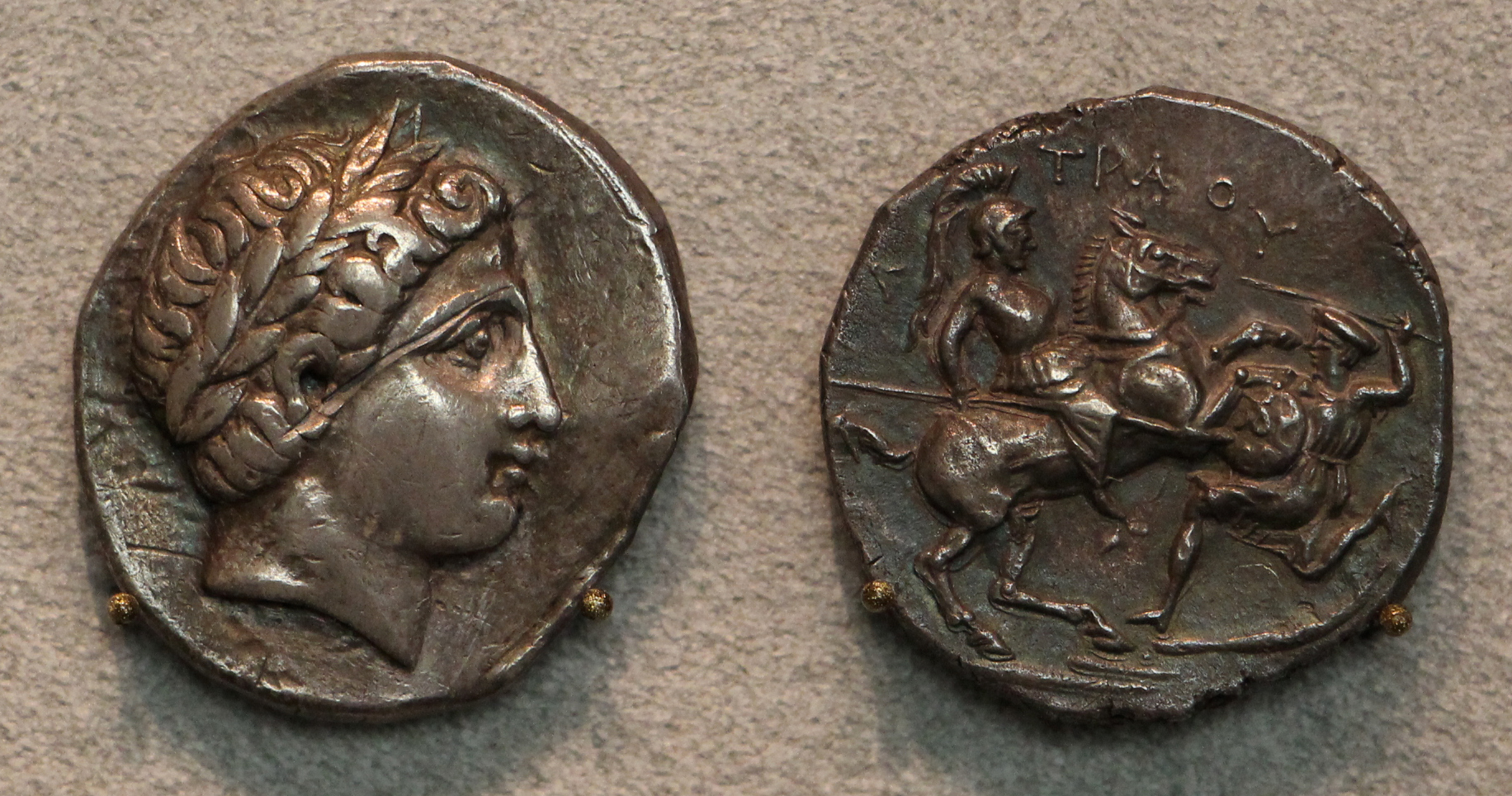
Coin of Patraus, king of Paeonia 335-315 BC

Philip II of Macedon absorbed the regions of Lynkestis, Pelagonia and the southern part of Paeonia (Deuriopus) into the kingdom of Macedon in 356 BC. After the death of Agis, the kingdom of Paeonia became vassal to Philip II in 356 BC. A Paeonian cavalry contingent led by Ariston was attached to Alexander the Great's army. Alexander wished to bestow the hand of his sister Cynane upon Langarus, king of the Agrianians, who had shown himself loyal to Philip II. Scupi and the surrounding area remained part of Dardania.

In 310 BC, Celtic armies attacked the area but were defeated by Cassander. In 279, the Gauls defeated Ptolemy Ceraunus and got as far as Delphi and it is certain that Paeonia was overrun and held for a time by their chieftain Brennus, but in the wake of the Celtic invasion, Leon reestablished the Paeonian kingdom. In 230 BC the Dardani under Longarus captured Bylazora. In 227 BC, Antigonus Doson reconquered the southern part of Paeonia and founded the city of Antigoneia, and ten years after Philip V of Macedon captured Bylazora; after this Perseis and Astraion were founded.

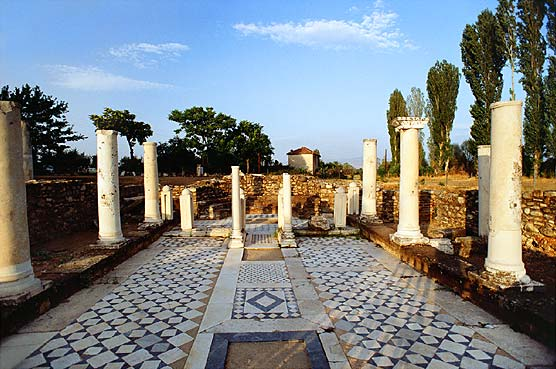
Heraclea Lyncestis, a city founded by Philip II of Macedon in the 4th century BC; ruins of the Byzantine "Small Basilica"

=== Roman period ===
The Romans established the province of Macedonia in 146 BC. By the time of Diocletian, the province was subdivided between Macedonia Prima ("first Macedonia") in the south, encompassing most of the kingdom of Macedon, and Macedonia Salutaris (meaning "wholesome Macedonia"), known also as Macedonia Secunda ("second Macedonia") in the north. Macedonia Salutaris encompassed the whole of Paeonia and Pelagonia, comprising most of the territory of the modern North Macedonia, with Stobi as its capital. Roman expansion brought the Scupi area, which was part of Dardania, in the province of Moesia. Whilst Greek remained the dominant language in the eastern part of the Roman Empire, especially south of the Jireček Line, Latin spread to Macedonia to some extent.

=== Medieval period ===
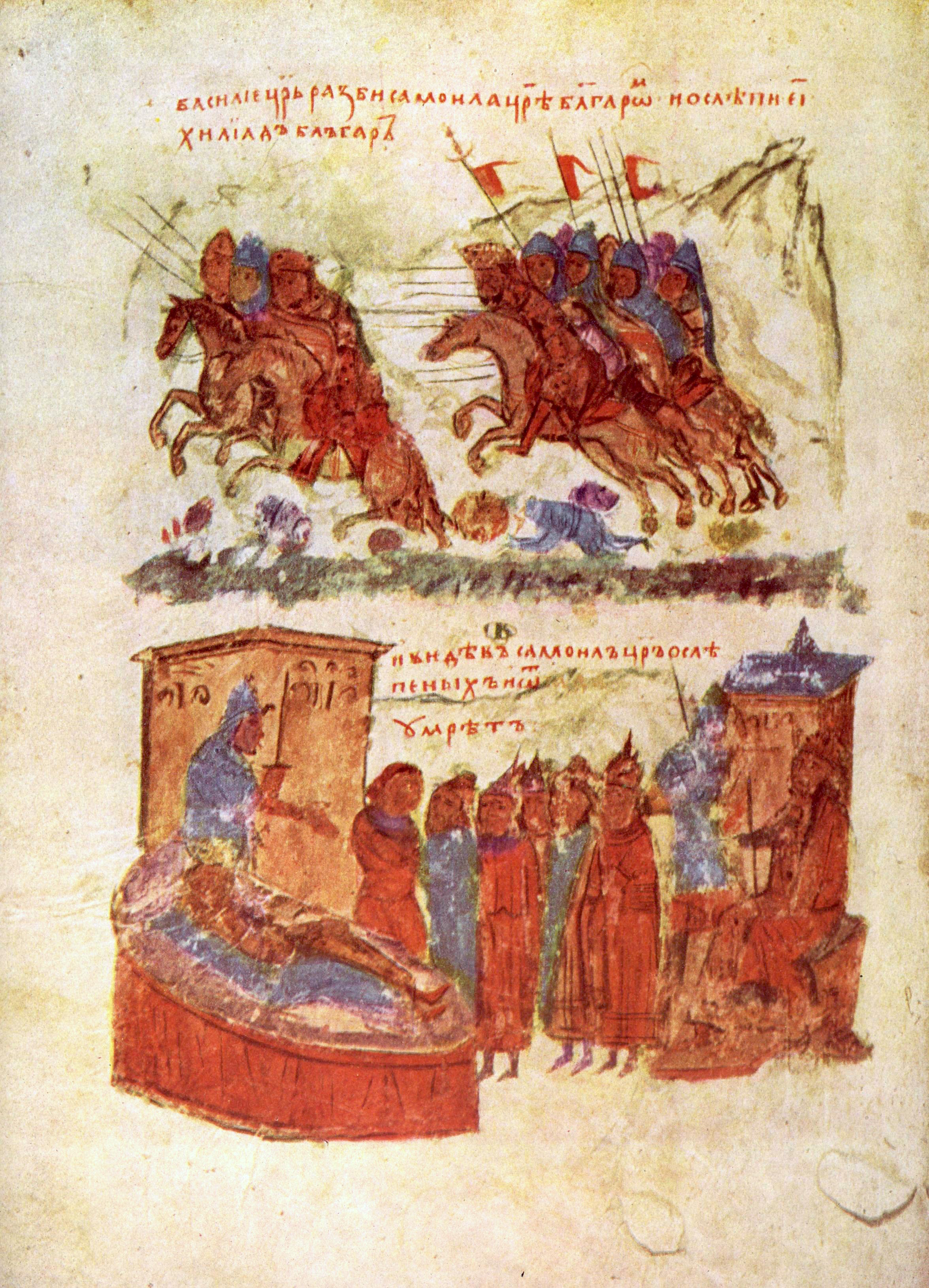
Miniature from the Manasses Chronicle, depicting the defeat of Samuil by Basil II and the return of his blinded soldiers

Slavic tribes settled in the Balkans including North Macedonia by the late 6th century AD. They were led by Pannonian Avars. The Slavs settled on places of earlier settlements and probably merged with the local populations to form mixed Byzantine-Slavic communities. Historical records document that in c. 680 a Bulgar ruler called Kuber led a group of largely Christians called Sermesianoi, who were his subjects, and they settled in the region of Pelagonia. They may have consisted of Bulgars, Byzantines, Slavs and even Germanic tribes.

Presian's reign apparently coincides with the extension of Bulgarian control over the Slavic tribes in and around Macedonia. The Slavic tribes converted to Christianity around the 9th century during the reign of Tsar Boris I of Bulgaria. The Ohrid Literary School became one of the two major cultural centres of the First Bulgarian Empire, along with the Preslav Literary School. Established in Ohrid in 886 by Saint Clement of Ohrid on the order of Boris I, the Ohrid Literary School was involved in the spreading of the Cyrillic script.

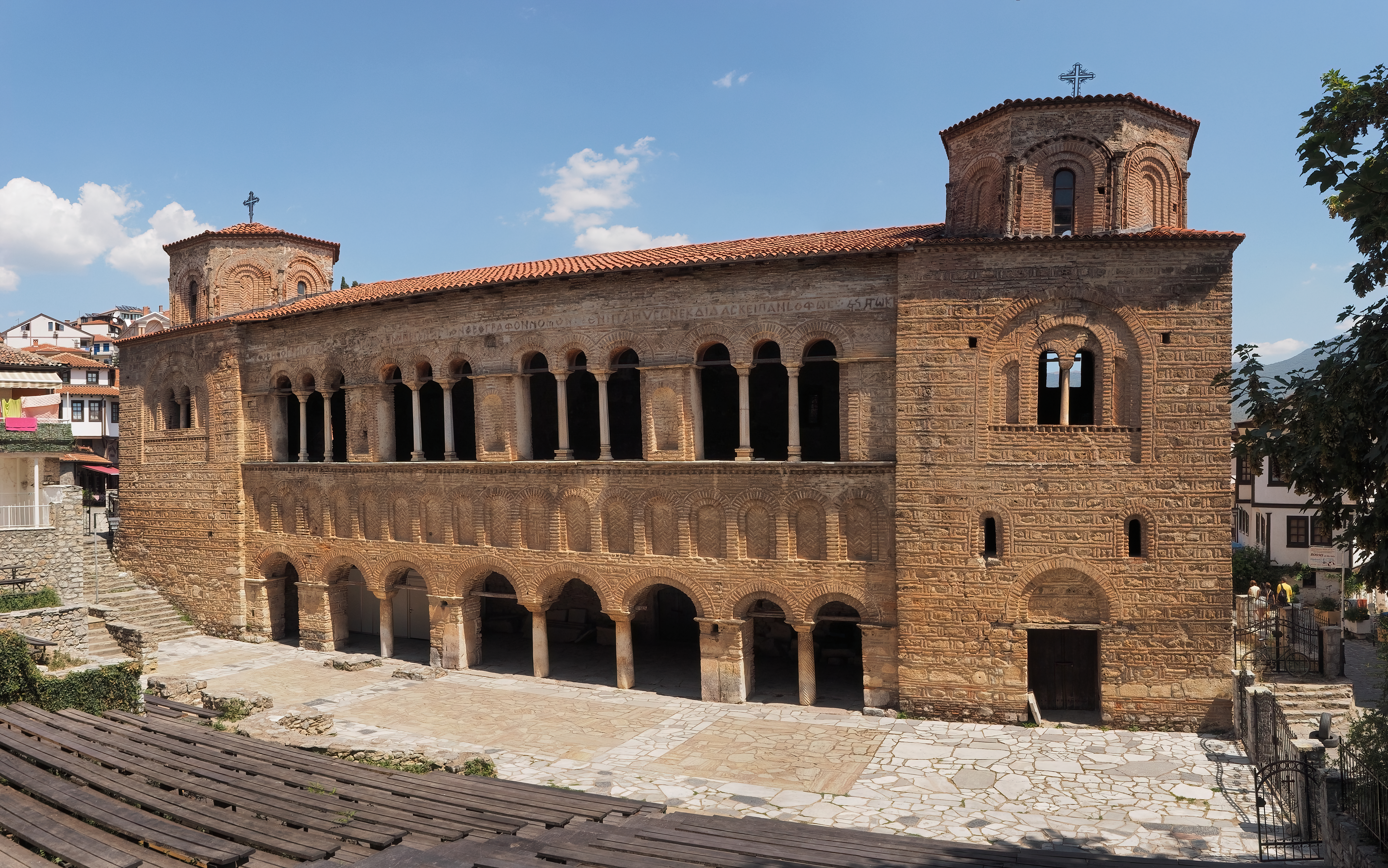
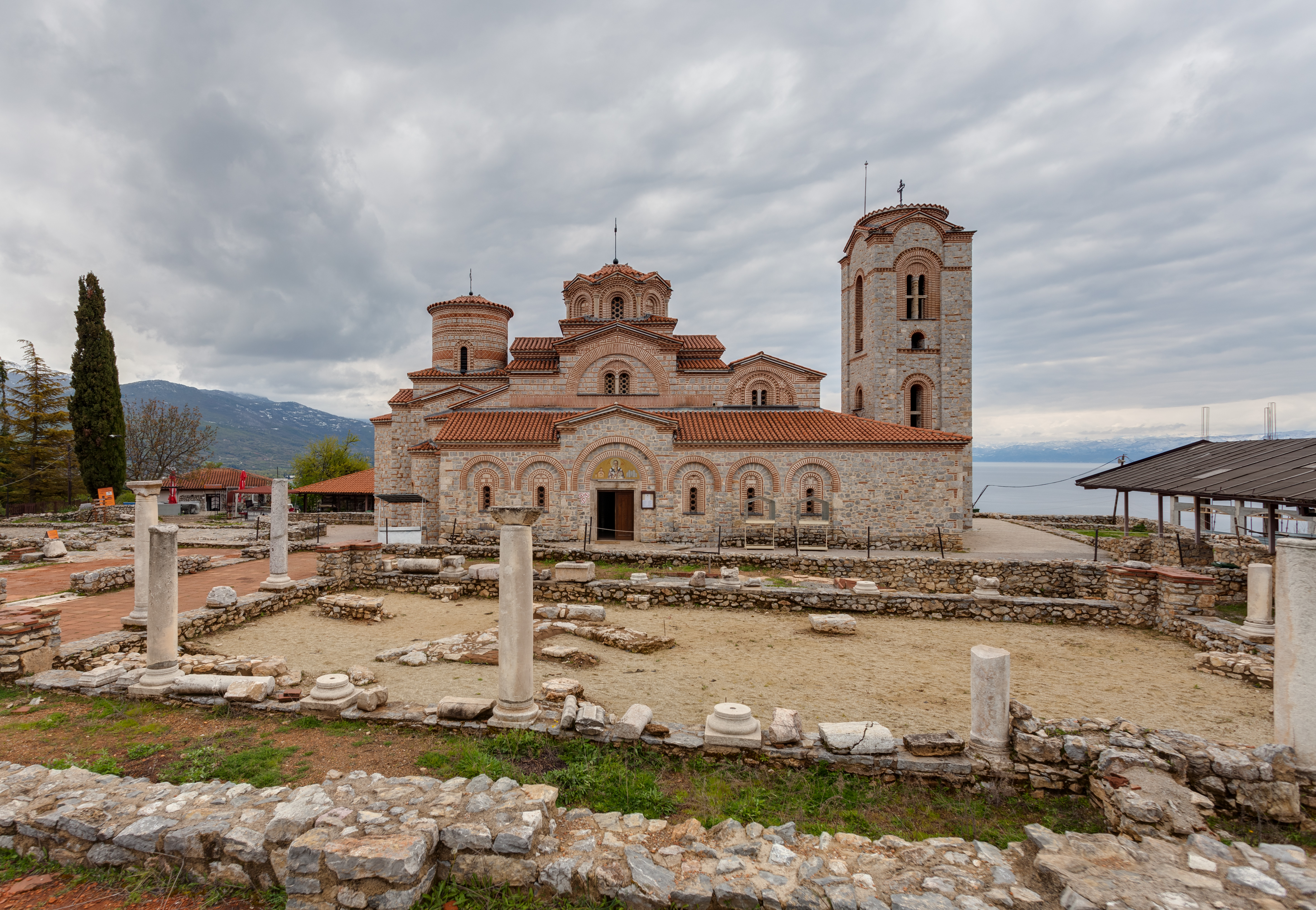
Church of St. Sophia, the first synod church of the Archbishopric of Ohrid (top). The Church of Sts. Clement and Panteleimon (bottom). Both churches are located in Ohrid.

After Sviatoslav's invasion of Bulgaria, the Byzantines took control of eastern Bulgaria. Samuil was proclaimed tsar of Bulgaria. He moved the capital to Skopje and then to Ohrid, which had been the cultural and military centre of southwestern Bulgaria since Boris I's rule. Samuil re-established Bulgarian power, but after several decades of conflicts, in 1014, Byzantine Emperor Basil II defeated his armies, and within four years the Byzantines restored control over the Balkans (modern-day North Macedonia was included into a new province, called Bulgaria). The rank of the autocephalous Bulgarian Patriarchate was lowered due to its subjugation to Constantinople, and it was transformed into the Archbishopric of Ohrid. By the late 12th century, Byzantine decline saw the region contested by various political entities, including a brief Norman occupation in the 1080s.

In the early 13th century, a revived Bulgarian Empire gained control of the region. Plagued by political difficulties, the empire did not last, and the region came once again under Byzantine control in the early 14th century.

In the 14th century, it became part of the Serbian Empire. Skopje became the capital of Tsar Stefan Dušan's empire. Following Dušan's death, a weak successor appeared, and power struggles between nobles divided the Balkans once again. These events coincided with the entry of the Ottoman Turks into Europe. The Kingdom of Prilep was one of the short-lived states that emerged from the collapse of the Serbian Empire, which was seized by the Ottomans following the Battle of Rovine in 1395.

=== Ottoman period ===
Gradually, all the central Balkans were conquered by the Ottoman Empire and remained under its domination for five centuries as part of the Rumelia Eyalet. The name Rumelia (Turkish: Rumeli) means "Land of the Romans" in Turkish, referring to the lands conquered by the Ottoman Turks from the Byzantine Empire. Over the centuries, Rumelia Eyalet was reduced in size through administrative reforms, until by the 19th century it consisted of a region of central Albania and western North Macedonia with its capital at Manastir (present-day Bitola). Rumelia Eyalet was abolished in 1867, and that territory of Macedonia subsequently became part of vilayets of Manastir, Kosova and Selanik until the end of Ottoman rule in 1912. With the beginning of the Bulgarian Revival in the 19th century, many of the reformers were from this region, including the Miladinov brothers, Rajko Žinzifov, Joakim Krčovski, Kiril Pejčinoviḱ and others. The bishoprics of Skopje, Debar, Bitola, Ohrid, Veles, and Strumica voted to join the Bulgarian Exarchate after it was established in 1870.

=== Modern period ===
==== Macedonian autonomism ====
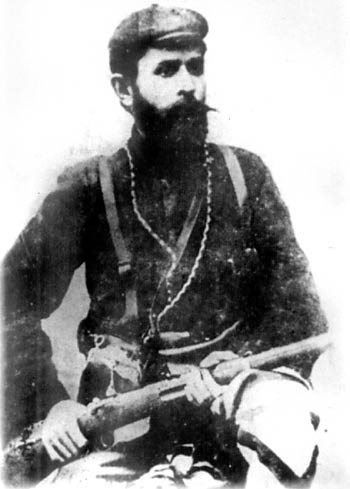
Nikola Karev, head of the provisional government of the short-lived Kruševo Republic during the Ilinden uprising

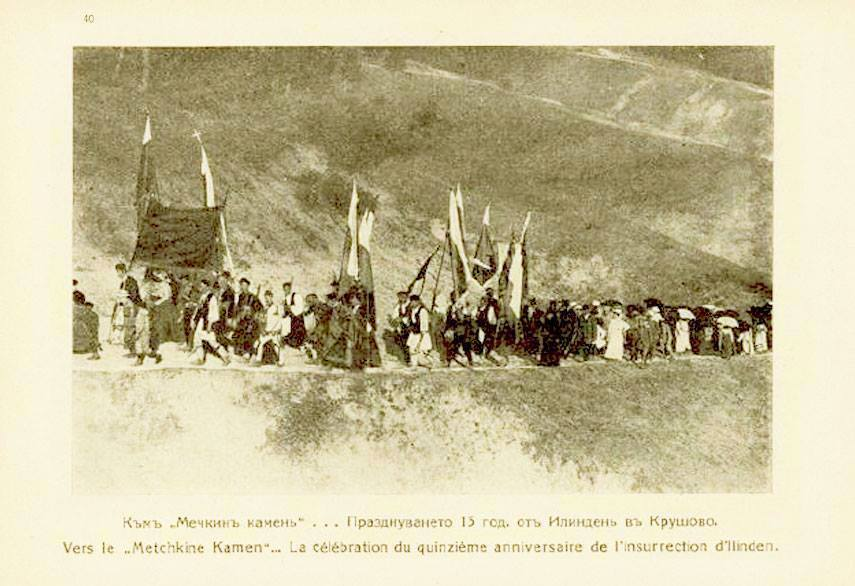
Celebration of the Ilinden Uprising in Kruševo during WWI Bulgarian occupation of Southern Serbia

Several movements whose goals were the establishment of an autonomous Macedonia, which would encompass the entire region of Macedonia, began to arise in the late 19th century; the earliest of these was the Bulgarian Macedonian-Adrianople Revolutionary Committees, later becoming Secret Macedonian-Adrianople Revolutionary Organisation. In 1905 it was renamed the Internal Macedonian-Adrianople Revolutionary Organization, and after World War I the organisation separated into the Internal Macedonian Revolutionary Organisation (IMRO) and the Internal Thracian Revolutionary Organisation (ITRO).

In the early years of the organisation, membership eligibility was exclusive to Bulgarians, but later it was extended to all inhabitants of European Turkey regardless of ethnicity or religion. The majority of its members were Macedonian Bulgarians. In 1903, IMRO organised the Ilinden–Preobrazhenie Uprising against the Ottomans, which after some initial successes, including forming the Kruševo Republic, was crushed with much loss of life. The uprising and the forming of the Kruševo Republic are considered the cornerstone and precursors to the eventual establishment of the Macedonian state. The leaders of the Ilinden uprising are celebrated as national heroes in North Macedonia. The names of IMRO revolutionaries like Gotse Delchev, Pitu Guli, Dame Gruev and Yane Sandanski are included in the lyrics of the national anthem "Denes nad Makedonija" ("Today over Macedonia"). Republic Day is celebrated on 2 August, Ilinden (St. Elijah day), the day of the Ilinden uprising.

==== Kingdom of Serbia ====
Following the two Balkan Wars of 1912 and 1913 and the dissolution of the Ottoman Empire, most of its European-held territories were divided between Greece, Bulgaria and Serbia. Most of the territory was annexed by Serbia conforming to the 1913 Treaty of Bucharest. Strumica region was passed to Bulgaria. Following the partition, an anti-Bulgarian campaign was carried out in the areas under Serbian and Greek control. As many as 641 Bulgarian schools and 761 churches were closed by the Serbs, while Exarchist clergy and teachers were expelled. The use of all Macedonian dialects and standard Bulgarian were proscribed. IMRO, together with local Albanians, organised the Ohrid–Debar uprising against the Serbian rule. Within a few days the rebels captured Gostivar, Struga and Ohrid, expelling the Serbian troops. According to the Carnegie Endowment for International Peace report, a Serbian army of 100,000 regulars suppressed the uprising. Many were killed, and tens of thousands of refugees fled to Bulgaria and Albania.

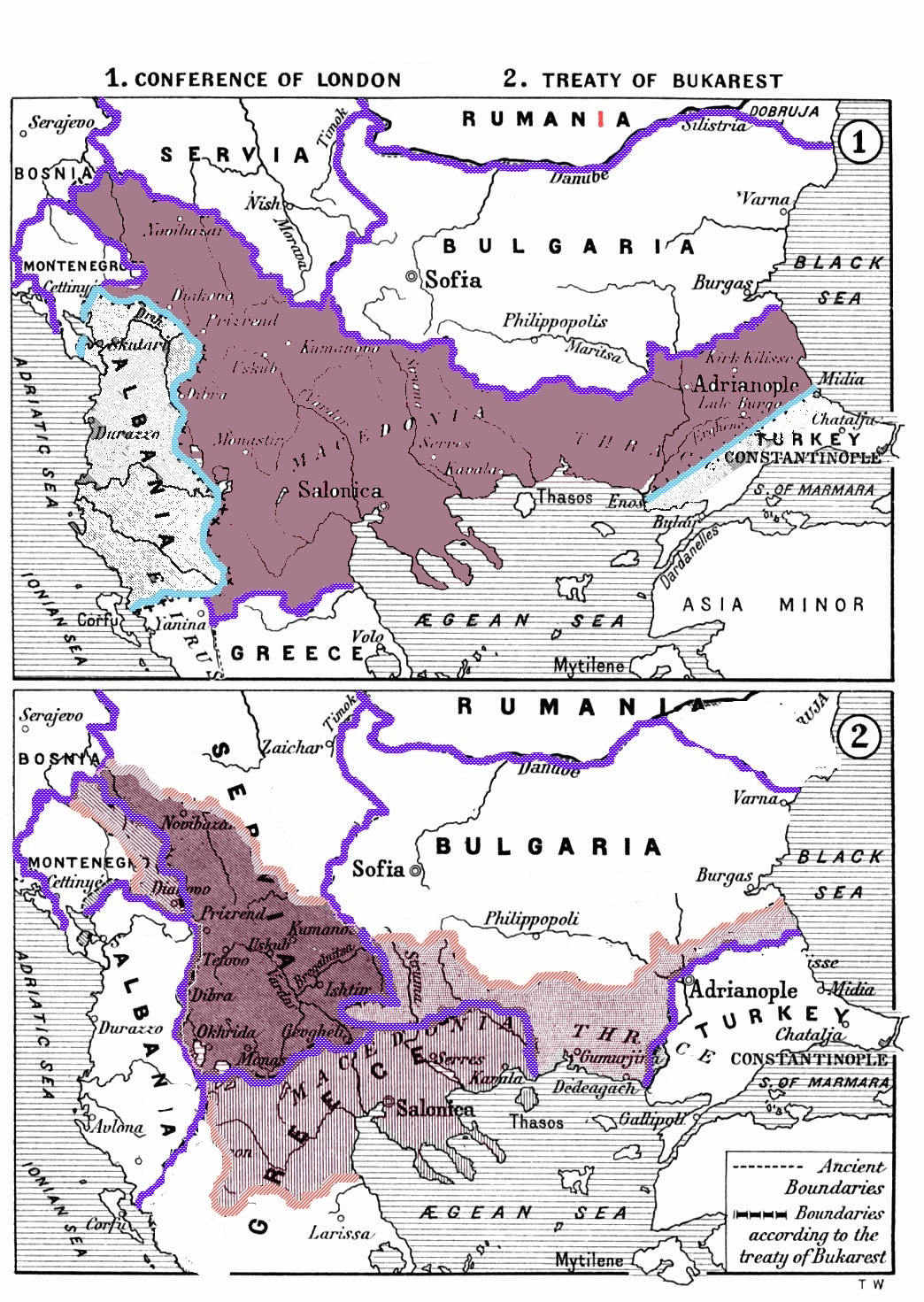
The division of the Ottoman territories in Europe (including the region of Macedonia) after the Balkan Wars according to the Treaty of Bucharest

==== World War I ====
During the First World War, most of today's North Macedonia was part of the Bulgarian occupied zone of Serbia after the country was invaded by the Central Powers in the fall of 1915. The region was known as the "Military Inspection Area of Macedonia" and was administered by a Bulgarian military commander. A policy of Bulgarisation was initiated, and the IMRO arose from a clandestine organisation to serve as gendarmerie, taking control of the whole police structure, enforcing Bulgarisation. According to historian Robert Gerwarth, the Bulgarian denationalisation policy, including its paramilitary aspect, was almost identical in its intent and execution to the Serbian policy that preceded it.

Bulgarian language was to be exclusively used; Serbian Cyrillic was forbidden; Serbian priests were arrested and deported; Serbian-sounding names had to be changed to Bulgarian ones; school teachers were brought from Bulgaria; and Serbian books were taken from schools and libraries and publicly destroyed. Adult males were sent to labour camps or forced to join the Bulgarian Army, representatives of the Serbian intelligentsia were deported or executed. According to Paul Mojzes the aim of the Bulgarian government was to create pure Bulgarian territories by denationalising the non-Bulgarian Slavic population of Macedonia.

==== Kingdom of Yugoslavia ====
After the capitulation of Bulgaria and the end of the First World War, the area returned under Belgrade control as part of the newly formed Kingdom of Serbs, Croats and Slovenes and saw a reintroduction of anti-Bulgarian measures. Bulgarian teachers and clergy were expelled, Bulgarian language signs and books removed, and all Bulgarian organisations dissolved. Also after the Treaty of Neuilly-sur-Seine, the Strumica region was annexed to Serbian Macedonia in 1919.

The Serbian government pursued a policy of forced Serbianisation in the region, which included systematic suppression of Bulgarian activists, altering family surnames, internal colonisation, exploiting workers, and intense propaganda. To aid the implementation of this policy, some 50,000 Serbian army and gendarmerie were stationed in present-day North Macedonia. By 1940 about 280 Serbian colonies (comprising 4,200 families) were established as part of the government's internal colonisation program (initial plans envisaged 50,000 families settling in present-day North Macedonia).

In 1929, the kingdom was officially renamed the Kingdom of Yugoslavia and divided into provinces called banovinas. South Serbia, including all of present-day North Macedonia, became the Vardar Banovina. The IMRO promoted the concept of an Independent Macedonia in the interwar period. Its leaders—including Todor Alexandrov, Aleksandar Protogerov, and Ivan Mihailov—promoted independence of the Macedonian territory split between Serbia and Greece for the whole population, regardless of religion and ethnicity. The Bulgarian government of Alexander Malinov in 1918 offered to give Pirin Macedonia for that purpose after World War I, but the Great Powers did not adopt this idea because Serbia and Greece opposed it. In 1924, the Communist International (Comintern) suggested that all Balkan communist parties adopt a platform of a "United Macedonia," but the suggestion was rejected by the Bulgarian and Greek communists.

IMRO followed by starting an insurgent war in Vardar Macedonia, together with Macedonian Youth Secret Revolutionary Organisation, which conducted guerrilla attacks against the Serbian administrative and army officials there. In 1923 in Štip, a paramilitary organisation called Association against Bulgarian Bandits was formed by Serbian chetniks, IMRO renegades and Macedonian Federative Organization members to oppose IMRO. On 9 October 1934, IMRO member Vlado Chernozemski assassinated Alexander I of Yugoslavia.

The Macedonist ideas increased in Yugoslav Vardar Macedonia and among the left diaspora in Bulgaria during the interwar period. They were supported by the Comintern. In 1934, the Comintern issued a special resolution in which for the first time directions were provided for recognising the existence of a separate Macedonian nation and Macedonian language.

==== World War II ====
Dimitar Vlahov, Mihajlo Apostolski, Metodija Andonov-Čento, Lazar Koliševski and others, greeted in Skopje on 20 November 1944, a week after its liberation

During World War II, Yugoslavia was occupied by the Axis powers from 1941 to 1945. The Vardar Banovina was divided between Bulgaria and Italian-occupied Albania. Bulgarian Action Committees were established to prepare the region for the new Bulgarian administration and army. The committees were mostly formed by former members of IMRO and Macedonian Youth Secret Revolutionary Organisation (some former members of IMRO (United) also participated).

As leader of the Vardar Macedonian communists, Metodi Shatorov ("Sharlo") switched from the Yugoslav Communist Party to the Bulgarian Communist Party and refused to start military action against the Bulgarian Army. The Bulgarian authorities, under German pressure, were responsible for the round-up and deportation of over 7,000 Jews in Skopje and Bitola. Harsh rule by the occupying forces encouraged many Vardar Macedonians to support the Communist Partisan resistance movement of Josip Broz Tito after 1943, (Note: This policy changed after 1943 with the arrival of Tito's envoy Montenegrin Serb Svetozar Vukmanović-Tempo. He began in earnest to organise armed resistance to the Bulgarian rule and sharply criticised Sharlo's pro-Bulgarian policy. At a meeting of the partisan brigades, as well as a group of battalions in the Resen region on 21 December 1943, Tempo makes the following comments about Shatorov and the leadership of the MCP: "They thought that the Macedonian people were Bulgarians and that they were oppressed by the hegemony of Great Serbia and had to be transferred to Bulgaria. Their basic slogan is: 'All non-Macedonians out of Macedonia'. The capital J [Serbo-Croatian spelling of Yugoslavia, Yugoslavian, etc.] was deleted from all documents. In fact they did not want Yugoslavia, no matter where it stood politically. When the war started, the initial decision of this leadership was to be separate from Yugoslavia and from Tito. They declared that Macedonia would be free as soon as the Bulgarians came....") and the National Liberation War ensued.

After the Bulgarian coup d'état of 1944, the Bulgarian troops, surrounded by German forces, fought their way back to the old borders of Bulgaria. Under the leadership of the new Bulgarian pro-Soviet government, four armies, 455,000 strong in total, were mobilised and reorganised. Most of them re-entered occupied Yugoslavia in early October 1944 and moved from Sofia to Niš, Skopje and Pristina with the strategic task of blocking the German forces withdrawing from Greece. The Bulgarian army would reach the Alps in Austria, participating in the expulsion of the Germans to the west, through Yugoslavia and Hungary.

Compelled by the Soviet Union with a view towards the creation of a large South Slav Federation, in 1946 the Communist government, led by Georgi Dimitrov, agreed to give Bulgarian Macedonia to a United Macedonia. With the Bled agreement, in 1947 Bulgaria formally confirmed the envisioned unification of the Macedonian region but postponed this act until after the formation of a federation. It was the first time it accepted the existence of a separate Macedonian ethnicity and language. After the Tito–Stalin split the region of Pirin Macedonia remained part of Bulgaria, and the Bulgarian Communist Party revised its view of the existence of a separate Macedonian nation and language.

==== Socialist Yugoslavia ====
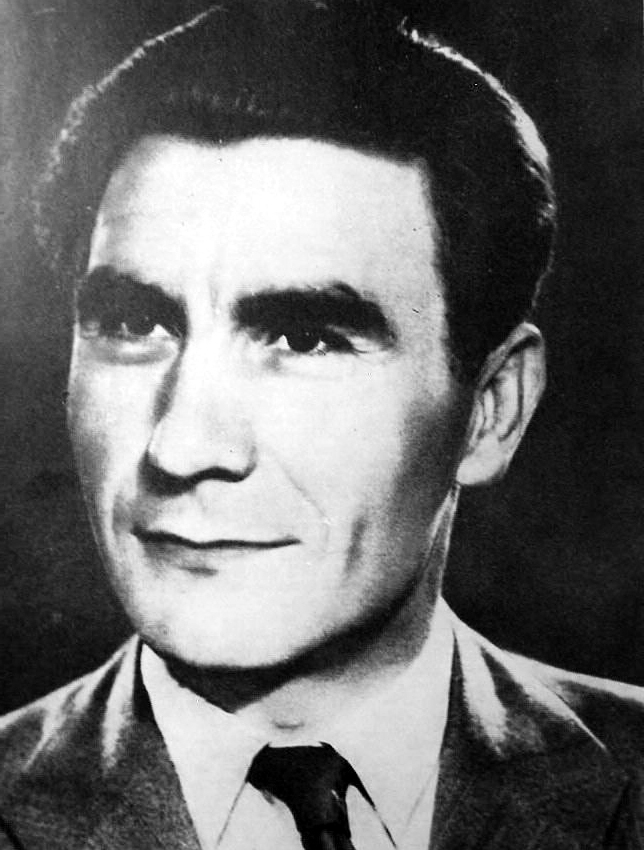
Lazar Koliševski was the political leader of SR Macedonia and briefly of SFR Yugoslavia.

In December 1944, the Anti-fascist Assembly for the National Liberation of Macedonia (ASNOM) proclaimed the People's Republic of Macedonia as part of the People's Federal Republic of Yugoslavia. ASNOM remained an acting government until the end of the war. The Macedonian alphabet was codified by linguists of ASNOM, who based their alphabet on the phonetic alphabet of Vuk Stefanović Karadžić and the principles of Krste Petkov Misirkov. During the civil war in Greece (1946–1949), Macedonian communist insurgents supported the Greek communists. Many refugees fled to the Socialist Republic of Macedonia from there.

The Republic of Macedonia became one of the six republics of the Yugoslav federation. Following the federation's renaming as the Socialist Federal Republic of Yugoslavia in 1963, the People's Republic of Macedonia was likewise renamed the Socialist Republic of Macedonia.

==== Declaration of independence ====
North Macedonia officially celebrates 8 September 1991 as Independence day (Macedonian: Ден на независноста, Den na nezavisnosta), with regard to the referendum endorsing independence from Yugoslavia. The anniversary of the start of the Ilinden Uprising on 2 August is celebrated on an official level as the Day of the Republic.

Robert Badinter, as the head of the Arbitration Commission of the Peace Conference on Yugoslavia, recommended European Economic Community recognition in January 1992. On 15 January 1992, Bulgaria was the first country to recognise the independence of the republic.

Macedonia remained at peace during the 1990s. A few minor changes to its border with Yugoslavia were agreed upon to resolve problems with the demarcation line between the two countries. It was seriously destabilised by the Kosovo War in 1999, when an estimated 360,000 ethnic Albanian refugees from Kosovo took refuge in the country. They departed shortly after the war, and Albanian nationalists on both sides of the border took up arms soon after in pursuit of autonomy or independence for the Albanian-populated areas of Macedonia.

=== 21st century ===
==== 2001 insurgency ====
Map of operations during the 2001 insurgency

A conflict took place between the government and ethnic Albanian insurgents, mostly in the north and west, between February and August 2001. The war ended with the intervention of a NATO ceasefire monitoring force. Under the terms of the Ohrid Agreement, the government agreed to devolve greater political power and cultural recognition to the Albanian minority. The Albanian side agreed to abandon separatist demands and to recognise all Macedonian institutions fully. In addition, according to this accord, the National Liberation Army (Macedonia) were to disarm and hand over their weapons to a NATO force. However the Macedonian security forces had two more armed confrontations with Albanian militant groups, in 2007 and 2015 respectively.

Inter-ethnic tensions flared in 2012, with incidents of violence between ethnic Albanians and Macedonians. In April 2017, about 200 protesters—reportedly mostly from the conservative VMRO-DPMNE party—stormed the Macedonian Parliament in response to the election of Talat Xhaferi (an ethnic Albanian and former National Liberation Army commander during the 2001 conflict) as the Speaker of the Assembly.

==== Antiquisation ====
Upon its coming to power in 2006, but especially since the country's non-invitation to NATO in 2008, the VMRO-DPMNE government pursued a policy of "Antiquisation" ("Antikvizatzija") as a way of putting pressure on Greece as well as for the purposes of domestic identity-building. Statues of Alexander the Great and Philip of Macedon were erected in several cities across the country. Additionally, many pieces of public infrastructure, such as airports, highways, and stadiums, were renamed after Alexander and Philip. These actions were seen as deliberate provocations in neighbouring Greece, exacerbating the dispute and further stalling the country's EU and NATO applications. The policy has also attracted criticism domestically, as well as from EU diplomats, and, following the Prespa agreement, it has been partly reversed after 2016 by the Social Democratic Union of Macedonia government. Moreover, per Prespa agreement both countries have acknowledged that their respective understanding of the terms "Macedonia" and "Macedonian" refers to a different historical context and cultural heritage.

==== NATO accession ====
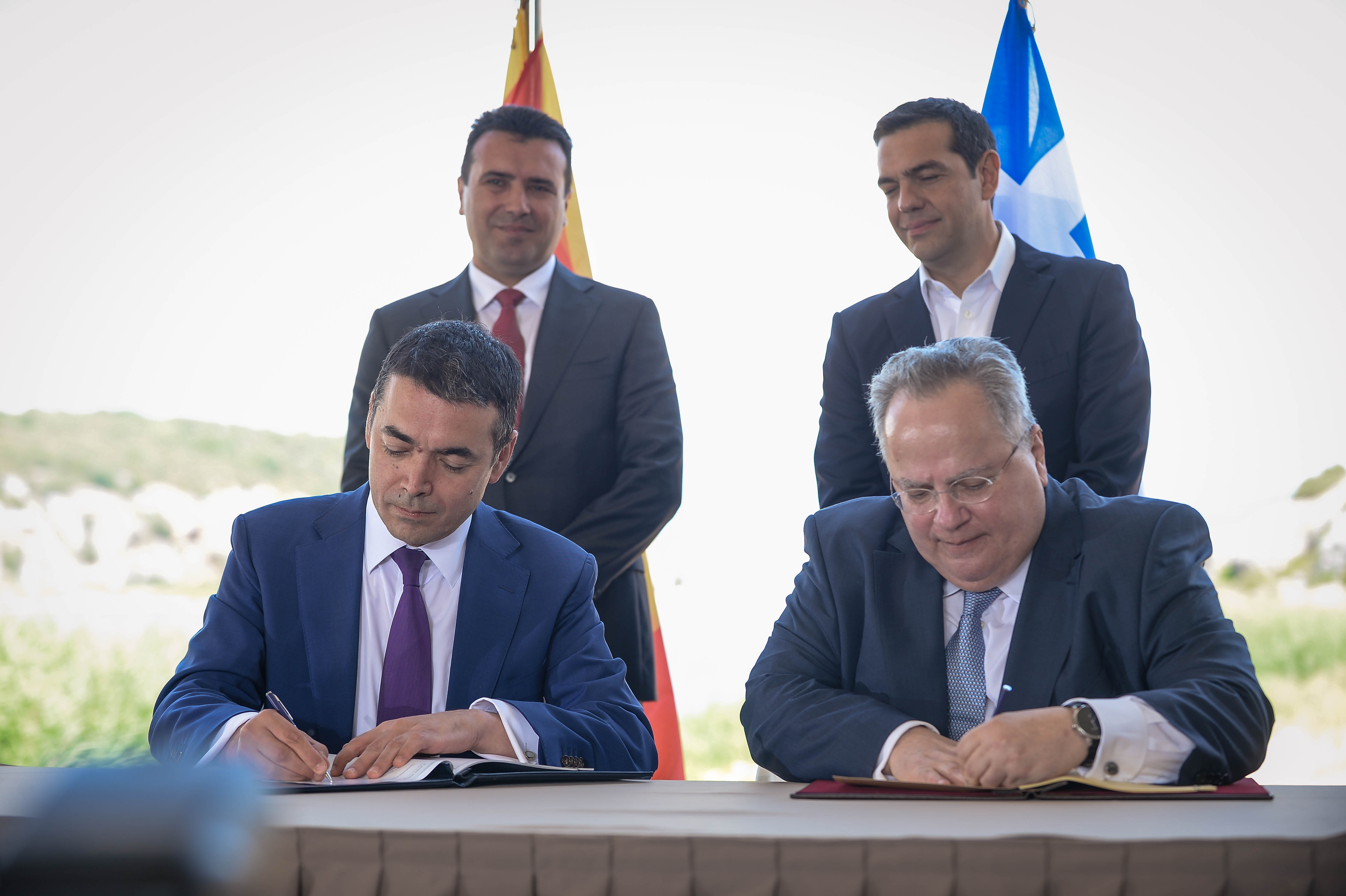
Symbolic signing of the Prespa agreement

In August 2017, the Republic of Macedonia signed a friendship agreement with Bulgaria, aiming to end the "anti-Bulgarian ideology" in the country and to solve the historical issues between the two. Under the Prespa agreement, signed with Greece in 2018, the country agreed to change its name to the Republic of North Macedonia and stop public use of the Vergina Sun. It retained the demonym "Macedonian" but clarified this as distinct from the Greek Macedonian identity in northern Greece. The agreement also included removal of irredentist material from textbooks and maps in both countries. It replaced the bilateral Interim Accord of 1995.

The withdrawal of the Greek veto, along with the signing the friendship agreement with Bulgaria, resulted in the European Union on 27 June approving the start of accession talks, which were expected to take place in 2019, under the condition that the Prespa deal was implemented. On 5 July, the Prespa agreement was ratified by the Macedonian parliament with 69 MPs voting in favour of it. On 12 July, NATO invited Macedonia to start accession talks in a bid to become the alliance's 30th member. On 30 July, the parliament of Macedonia approved plans to hold a non-binding referendum on changing the country's name, which took place on 30 September. Ninety-one percent of voters voted in favour with a 37% turnout, but the referendum was not carried because of a constitutional requirement for a 50% turnout.

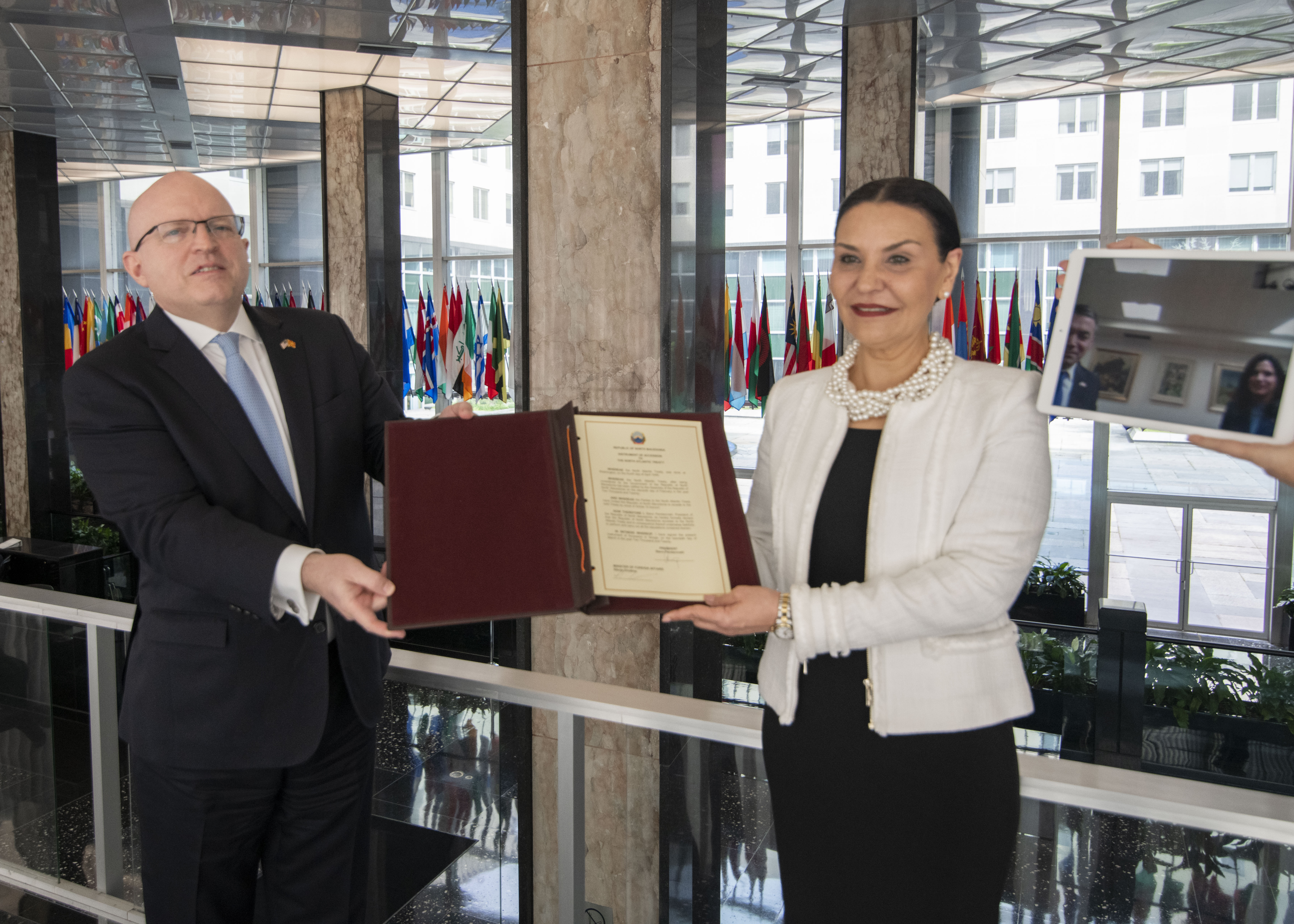
North Macedonia commemorates its accession to NATO at the US Department of State.

On 6 February 2019, the permanent representatives of NATO member states and Macedonian Foreign Affairs Minister Nikola Dimitrov, signed in Brussels the accession protocol of North Macedonia into NATO. The protocol was ratified on 8 February by the Greek parliament, thus completing all the preconditions for putting into force the Prespa agreement. Subsequently, on 12 February the Macedonian government announced the formal activation of the constitutional amendments which effectively renamed the country as North Macedonia and informed accordingly the United Nations and its member states. In March 2020, after the ratification process by all NATO members was completed, North Macedonia acceded to NATO, becoming the 30th member state.

=== EU path ===
In March 2020, the leaders of the European Union formally gave approval to North Macedonia to begin talks to join the EU. On 17 November 2020, Bulgaria refused to approve the European Union's negotiation framework for North Macedonia, effectively blocking the official start of accession talks with this country. The explanation from the Bulgarian side was: no implementation of the friendship treaty from 2017, state-supported hate speech, minority claims, and an "ongoing nation-building process" based on historical negationism of the Bulgarian identity, culture and legacy in the broader region of Macedonia. The veto received condemnation by intellectuals from both states and criticism from international observers.

Protests broke out in July 2022, organised by the opposition parties, over the French proposal for the accession of North Macedonia to the EU. The accession talks for the accession of North Macedonia to the EU officially began in the same month, after the French proposal was passed by the Assembly of North Macedonia.

The 2023 European Commission Progress Report has cited the unfulfilled constitutional changes, as the primary reasons for the blocking of the further country's accession path. The EU's intention regarding the country's accession seems unclear, excluding desire to maintain its geopolitical influence here, countering the Chinese and Russian impact in the Western Balkans. On 25 September 2024, the EU announced the separation of Albania from North Macedonia on the EU accession path, due to the disputes between North Macedonia and Bulgaria. Following the decision, the EU opened negotiations on the first chapters with Albania separately on October 15, 2024.

== Geography ==
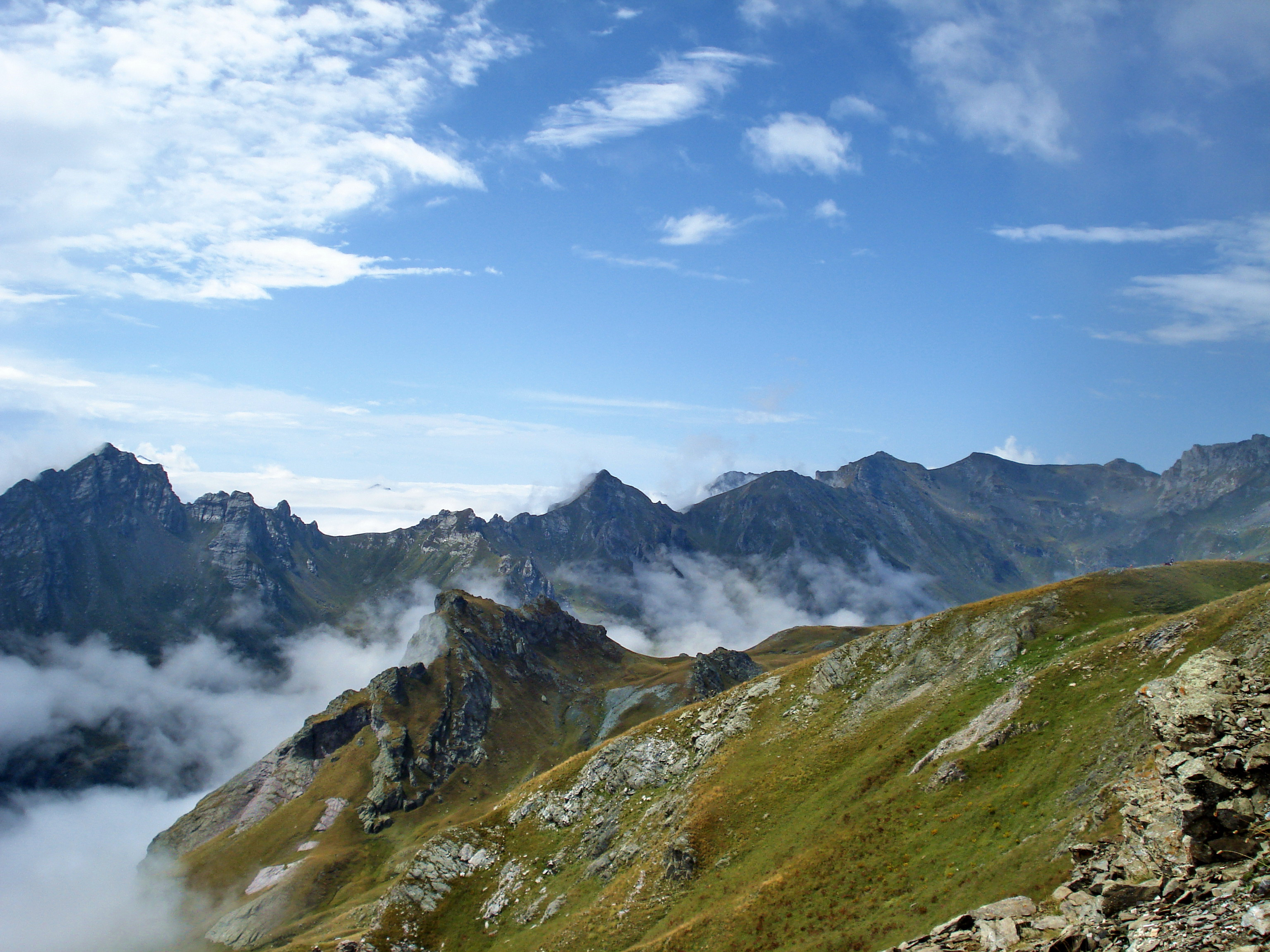
Mount Korab, the highest mountain in North Macedonia

North Macedonia has a total area of 25,436 km^{2} (9,821 sq mi). It lies between latitudes 40° and 43° N, and mostly between longitudes 20° and 23° E (a small area lies east of 23°), with some 748 km (465 mi) of boundaries, shared with Serbia (62 km or 39 mi) to the north, Kosovo (159 km or 99 mi) to the northwest, Bulgaria (148 km or 92 mi) to the east, Greece (228 km or 142 mi) to the south, and Albania (151 km or 94 mi) to the west. It is a transit way for shipment of goods from Greece through the Balkans. It is part of the larger region of Macedonia, which also includes Greek Macedonia and the Blagoevgrad Province in southwestern Bulgaria.

North Macedonia is a landlocked country that is geographically clearly defined by a central valley formed by the Vardar river and framed along its borders by mountain ranges. The terrain is mostly rugged, located between the Šar Mountains and Osogovo, which frame the valley of the Vardar. Mount Korab of the Šar Mountains on the Albanian border, at 2,764 m (9,068 ft), is the tallest mountain in North Macedonia. Three large lakes—Lake Ohrid, Lake Prespa and Dojran Lake—lie on the southern borders, bisected by the frontiers with Albania and Greece. Ohrid is considered to be one of the oldest lakes and biotopes in the world. The region is seismically active and has been the site of destructive earthquakes in the past, most recently in 1963 when Skopje was heavily damaged by a major earthquake, killing over 1,000.

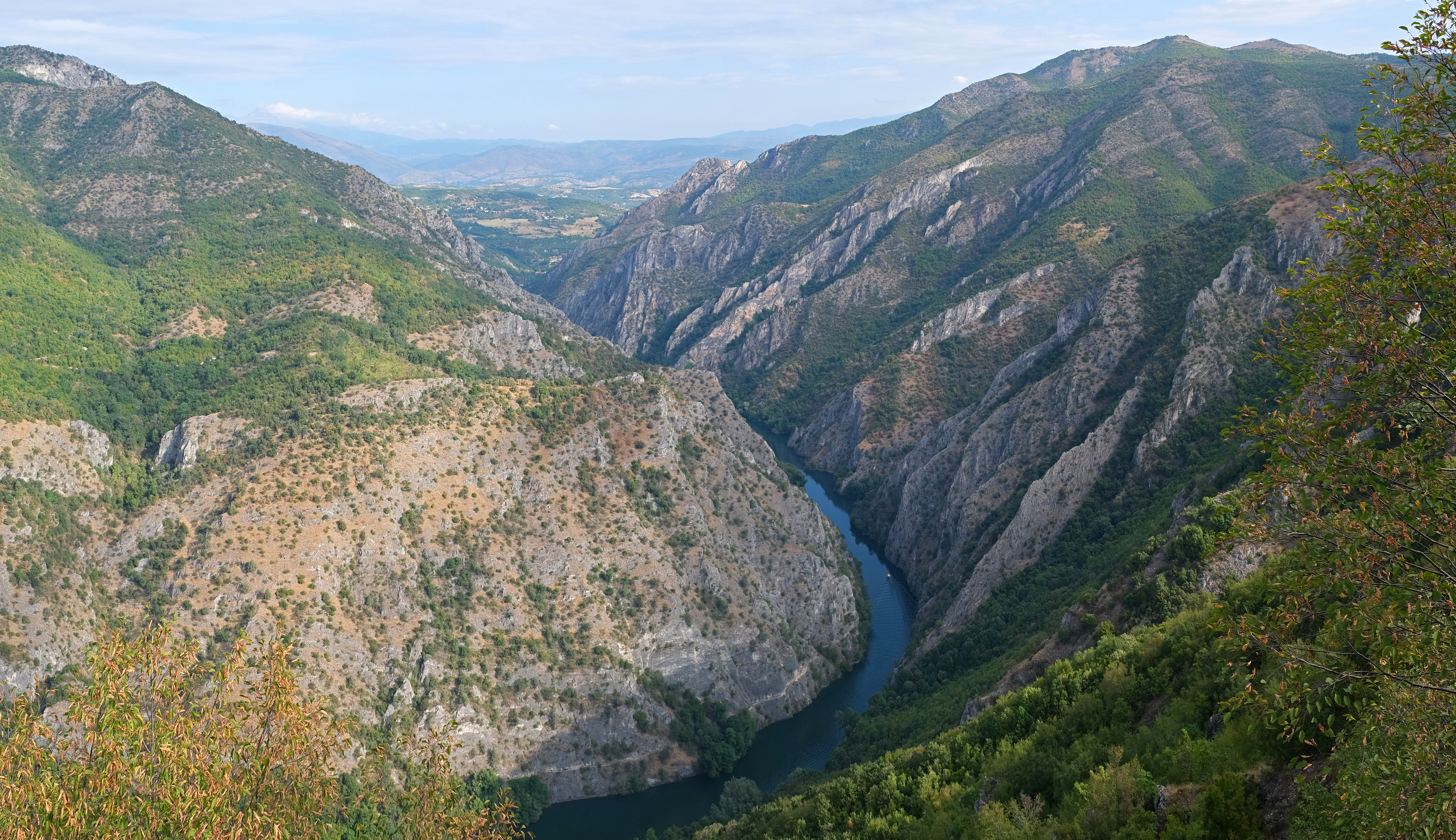
Matka Canyon

The rivers flow into three different basins: the Aegean, the Adriatic and the Black Sea. The Aegean basin is the largest. It covers 87% of the territory, which is 22,075 square kilometres (8,523 sq mi). Vardar, the largest river in this basin, drains 80% of the territory or 20,459 square kilometres (7,899 sq mi). Its valley plays an important part in the economy and the communication system of the country. The Vardar Valley project is considered to be crucial for the strategic development of the country. The river Black Drin forms the Adriatic basin, which covers an area of about 3,320 km^{2} (1,282 sq mi), i.e., 13% of the territory. It receives water from Lakes Prespa and Ohrid. The Black Sea basin is the smallest with 37 km^{2} (14 sq mi). It covers the northern side of Mount Skopska Crna Gora. This is the source of the river Binačka Morava, which joins the Morava, and later, the Danube, which flows into the Black Sea.

=== Climate ===
Köppen–Geiger climate classification map for North Macedonia

There are four different seasons with warm and dry summers and moderately cold and snowy winters. Temperatures throughout the year range from −20 °C (−4 °F) in winter, to 40 °C (104 °F) in summer. Low winter temperatures are influenced by winds from the north while hot summers arise from the subtropical pressure of the Aegean Sea and climate influences from the Middle East, with the latter causing dry periods.

There are three main climatic zones: mildly continental in the north, temperate Mediterranean in the south, and mountainous in the zones with high altitude. Along the valleys of the Vardar and Strumica rivers, in the regions of Gevgelija, Valandovo, Dojran, Strumica, and Radoviš, the climate is temperate Mediterranean. The warmest regions are Demir Kapija and Gevgelija, where the temperature in July and August frequently exceeds 40 °C (104 °F).

Average annual precipitation varies from 1,700 mm (66.9 in) in the western mountainous area to 500 mm (19.7 in) in the eastern area. There is a low level of precipitation in the Vardar valley with 500 mm (19.7 in) of water per year. The climate and irrigation diversity allow the cultivation of different plant types, including wheat, maize, potatoes, poppies, peanuts, and rice.

=== Biodiversity ===
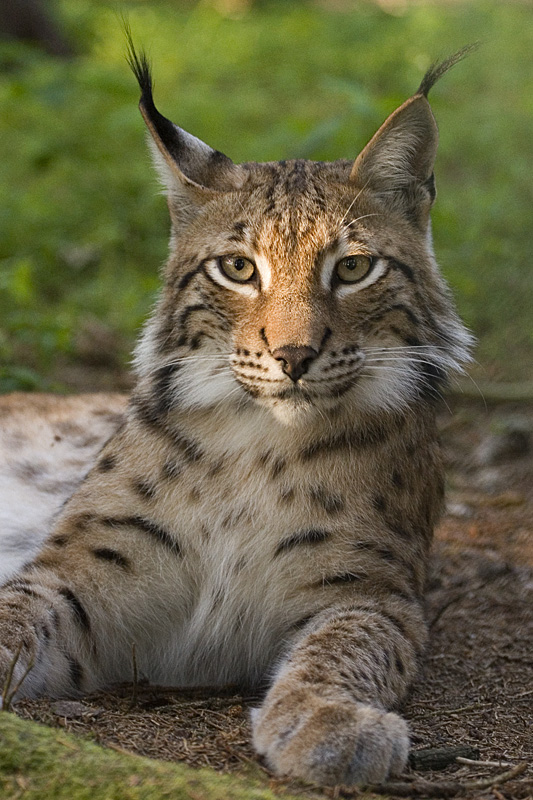
Eurasian lynx

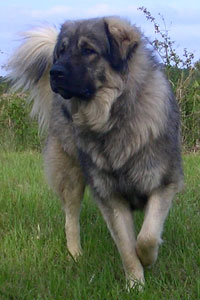
Šarplaninec

The flora is represented by around 210 families, 920 genera, and around 3,700 plant species. The most abundant group are the flowering plants with around 3,200 species, followed by mosses (350 species) and ferns (42).

Phytogeographically, North Macedonia belongs to the Illyrian province of the Circumboreal Region within the Boreal Kingdom. According to the World Wide Fund for Nature and the Digital Map of European Ecological Regions by the European Environment Agency, the territory can be subdivided into four terrestrial ecoregions: the Pindus Mountains mixed forests, Balkan mixed forests, Rodope montane mixed forests, and Aegean and Western Turkey sclerophyllous and mixed forests. The 2019 Forest Landscape Integrity Index was 7.42/10, ranking 40th globally out of 172 countries.

The native forest fauna is abundant and includes bears, wild boars, wolves, foxes, squirrels, chamois and deer. The lynx is found, very rarely, in the mountains of western Macedonia, while deer can be found in the region of Demir Kapija. Forest birds include the blackcap, the grouse, the black grouse, the imperial eagle and the forest owl.

The country has four national parks:

Name	Established	Size	Map	Picture
Mavrovo	1948	731 km^{2}	North Macedonia is located in North Macedonia	
Galičica	1958	227 km^{2}	North Macedonia is located in North Macedonia	
Pelister	1948	125 km^{2}	North Macedonia is located in North Macedonia	
Šar Planina	2021	244 km^{2}	North Macedonia is located in North Macedonia	

== Politics ==
Gordana Siljanovska; Davkova; President	Hristijan Mickoski; Prime Minister

North Macedonia is a parliamentary democracy with an executive government composed of a coalition of parties from the unicameral legislature (Собрание, Sobranie; Assembly in English) and an independent judicial branch with a constitutional court. The Assembly is made up of 120 seats and the members are elected every four years. The role of the president is mostly ceremonial, with the real power resting in the hands of the prime minister. The president is the commander-in-chief of the state armed forces and a president of the State Security Council. The president is elected every five years and can be elected twice at most.

Since 2019, local government functions are divided between 80 municipalities (општини, opštini; singular: општина, opština). The capital, Skopje, is governed as a group of ten municipalities collectively referred to as the "City of Skopje". Municipalities are units of local self-government. Neighbouring municipalities may establish co-operative arrangements.

The main political divergence is between the largely ethnically based political parties representing the ethnic Macedonian majority and Albanian minority. The issue of the power balance between the two communities led to a brief war in 2001, following which a power-sharing agreement was reached. In August 2004, parliament passed legislation redrawing local boundaries and giving greater local autonomy to ethnic Albanians in areas where they predominate.

After a troublesome pre-election campaign, North Macedonia saw a relatively calm and democratic change of government in the elections held on 5 July 2006. The elections were marked by a decisive victory of the centre-right party VMRO-DPMNE led by Nikola Gruevski. Gruevski's decision to include the Democratic Party of Albanians in the government—instead of the Democratic Union for Integration–Party for Democratic Prosperity coalition which won the majority of the Albanian votes—triggered protests with Albanians. A dialogue was established between the Democratic Union for Integration and VMRO-DMPNE as an effort to talk about the disputes between the two parties and to support European and NATO aspirations of the country. In June 2017, Zoran Zaev of the Social Democratic Party, became the prime minister. His centre-left government ended 11 years of conservative VMRO-DPMNE rule by Gruevski.

Hristijan Mickoski became prime minister in 2024. Gordana Siljanovska-Davkova took office in the same year, becoming the country's first female president.

Parliament, or Assembly (Macedonian: Собрание, Sobranie), is the country's legislative body. It makes, proposes and adopts laws. The Constitution of North Macedonia has been in use since shortly after the independence of the republic in 1991. It limits the power of the governments, both local and national. The military is also limited by the constitution. The constitution states that North Macedonia is a social free state, and that Skopje is the capital. The 120 members are elected for a mandate of four years through a general election. Each citizen aged 18 years or older can vote for one of the political parties. The current president of Parliament is Jovan Mitreski since 2024.

Executive power in North Macedonia is exercised by the government, whose prime minister is the most politically powerful person in the country. The members of the government are chosen by the prime minister and there are ministers for each branch of the society. There are ministers for economy, finance, information technology, society, internal affairs, foreign affairs and other areas. The members of the government are elected for a mandate of four years. Judiciary power is exercised by courts, with the court system being headed by the Judicial Supreme court, Constitutional Court and the Republican Judicial Council. The assembly appoints the judges.

=== Administrative divisions ===
Rural/Urban municipalities

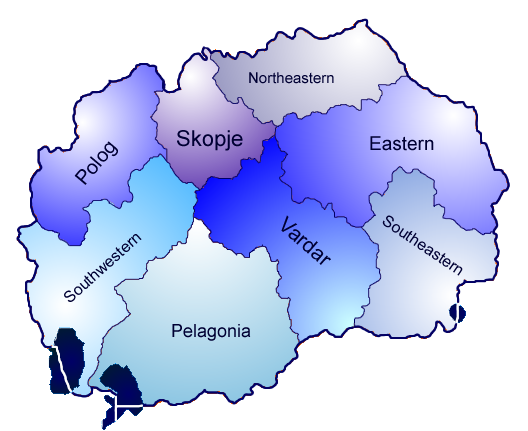
Statistical regions of North Macedonia

North Macedonia's statistical regions exist solely for legal and statistical purposes. The regions are:

- Eastern
- Northeastern
- Pelagonia
- Polog
- Skopje
- Southeastern
- Southwestern
- Vardar

In August 2004, the country was reorganised into 84 municipalities (opštini; sing. opština) and reduced to 80 in 2013; 10 of the municipalities constitute the city of Skopje, a distinct unit of local self-government and the country's capital.

Most of the current municipalities were unaltered or merely amalgamated from the previous 123 municipalities established in September 1996; others were consolidated and their borders changed. Prior to this, local government was organised into 34 administrative districts, communes, or counties (also opštini).

=== Foreign relations ===
The major interest of the country is a full integration in the European and the Trans-Atlantic integration processes. North Macedonia is a member of: IMF (since 1992), WHO (since 1993), EBRD (since 1993), Central European Initiative (since 1993), Council of Europe (since 1995), OSCE (since 1995), SECI (since 1996), La Francophonie (since 2001), WTO (since 2003), CEFTA (since 2006), and NATO (since 2020). In 2005, the country was officially recognised as a European Union candidate state.

=== Military ===
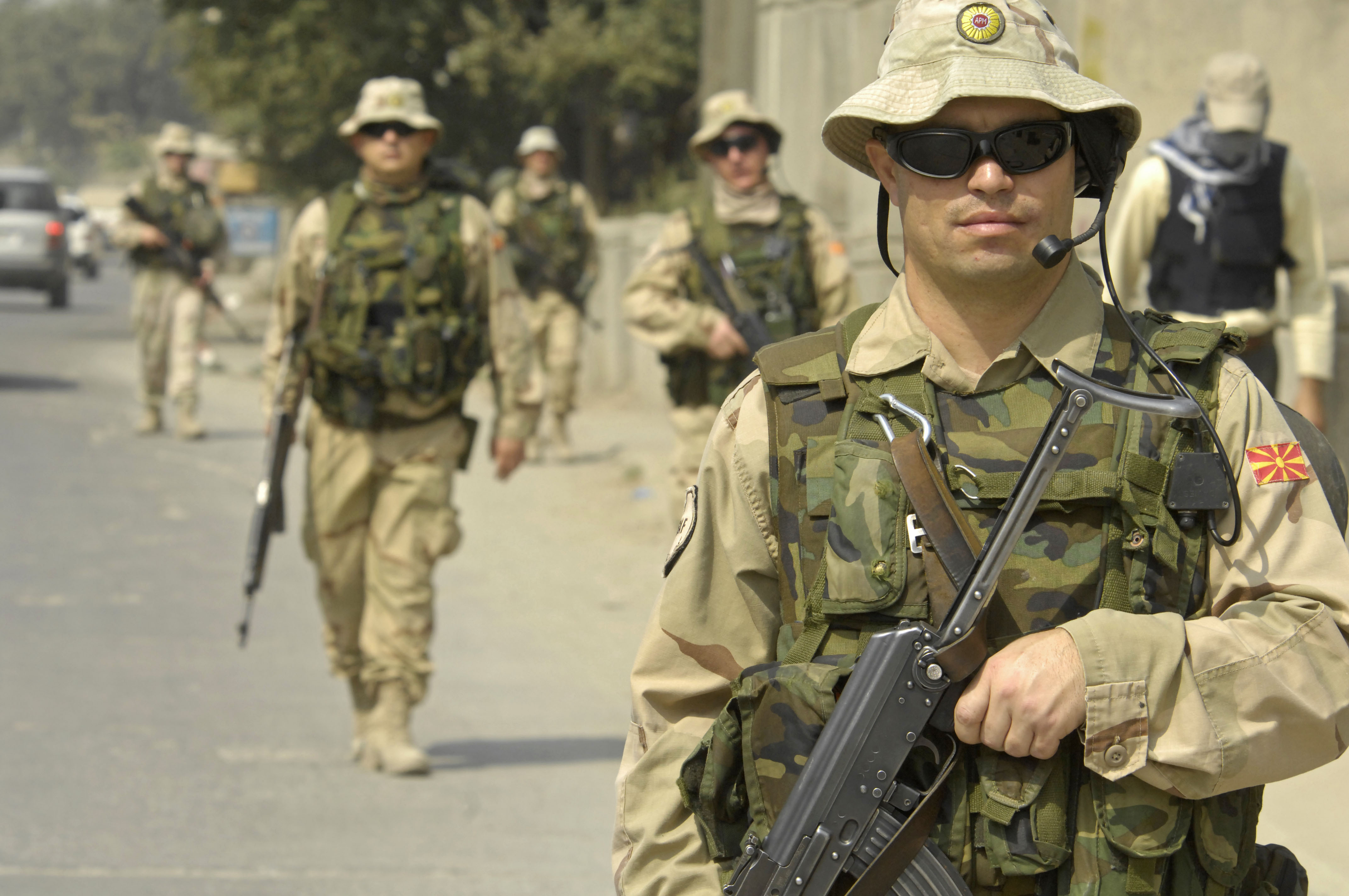
Macedonian soldiers of the Special Operations Regiment in Kabul, Afghanistan

The Army of North Macedonia is led by the General Staff. Below it are the Operations Command, which includes the Mechanized Infantry Brigade, the Air Brigade, the Special Operations Regiment, and several independent battalions; the Training and Doctrine Command, which also oversees the Military Reserve Force; and the Logistics Base. There is also an Honor Guard Battalion that is directly subordinated to the General Staff. As of 2024 the army had 8,000 active personnel and 4,850 reservists, and as of 2023 it had a military budget of US$275 million. It has been a volunteer military since conscription was ended in 2007. North Macedonia has deployed troops to Afghanistan, Bosnia and Herzegovina, Iraq, Kosovo, and Lebanon, as part of NATO, EU, or UN missions.

The Ministry of Defence develops the defence strategy and assesses possible threats and risks. It is also responsible for the defence system, including training, readiness, equipment, and development, and for drawing up and presenting the defence budget.

=== Human rights ===
North Macedonia is a signatory to the European Convention on Human Rights and the UN Geneva Convention Relating to the Status of Refugees and Convention against Torture, and the Constitution guarantees basic human rights to all Macedonian citizens. According to human rights organisations, in 2003 there were suspected extrajudicial executions, threats against, and intimidation of, human rights activists and opposition journalists, and allegations of torture by the police.

== Economy ==
Ranked as the fourth "best reformatory state" out of 178 countries ranked by the World Bank in 2009, North Macedonia has undergone considerable economic reform since independence. The country has developed an open economy with trade accounting for more than 90% of GDP in recent years. Since 1996, North Macedonia has witnessed steady, though slow, economic growth with GDP growing by 3.1% in 2005. This figure was projected to rise to an average of 5.2% in the 2006–2010 period. The government has proven successful in its efforts to combat inflation, with an inflation rate of only 3% in 2006 and 2% in 2007, and has implemented policies focused on attracting foreign investment and promoting the development of small and medium-sized enterprises.

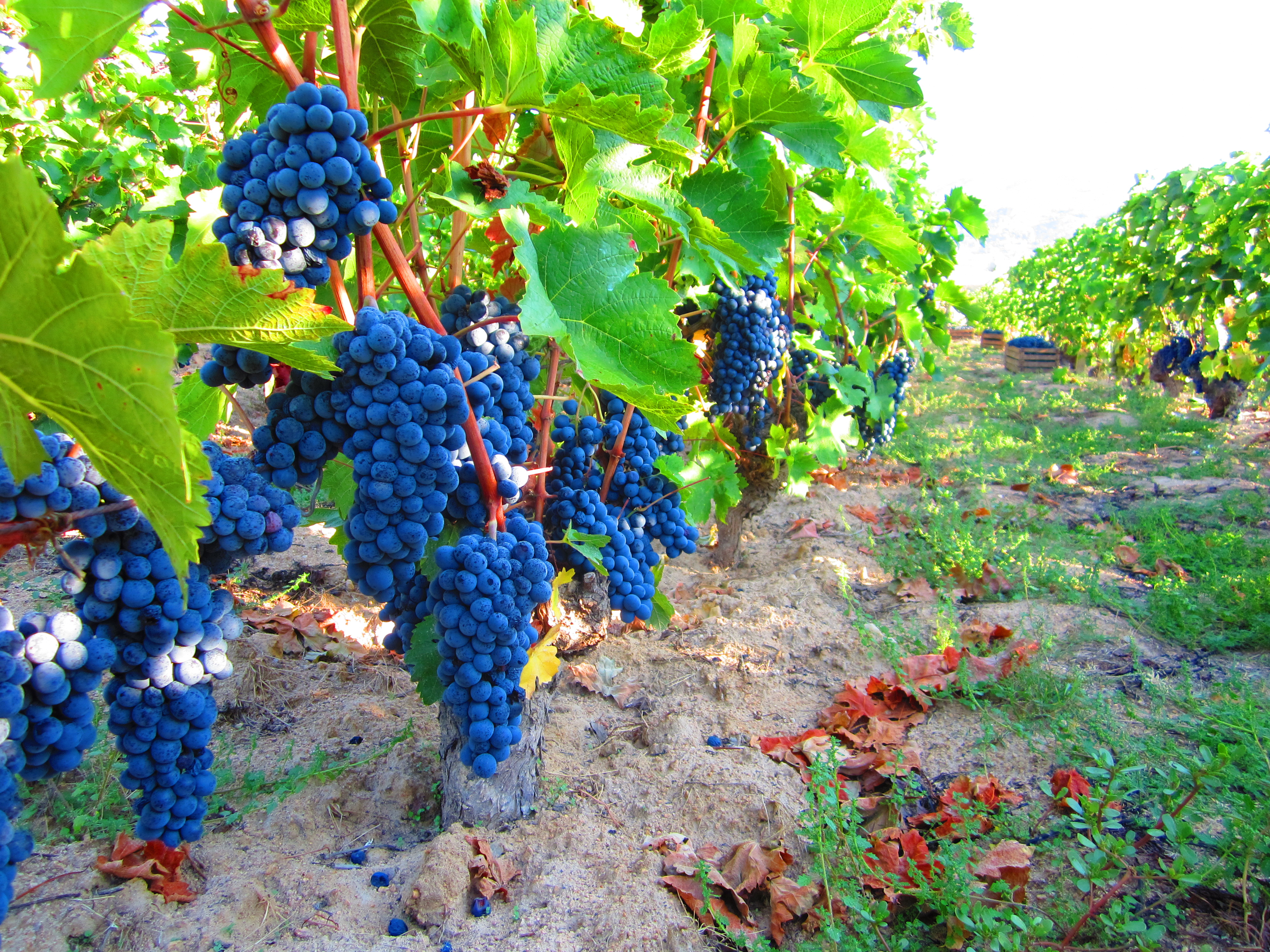
Vineyard in North Macedonia

A flat tax system was introduced in 2006 with the intention of making the country more attractive to foreign investment. The flat tax rate was 12% in 2007 and was further lowered to 10% in 2008. As of 2005 the unemployment rate was 37.2% and as of 2006 its poverty rate was 22%. Due to a number of employment measures as well as the successful process of attracting multinational corporations, and according to the State Statistical Office of North Macedonia, the unemployment rate in the first quarter of 2015 decreased to 27.3%. Government's policies and efforts in regards to foreign direct investments have resulted with the establishment of local subsidiaries of several world leading manufacturing companies, especially from the automotive industry, such as: Johnson Controls Inc., Van Hool NV, Johnson Matthey plc, Lear Corp., Visteon Corp., Kostal GmbH, Gentherm Inc., Dräxlmaier Group, Kromberg & Schubert, Marquardt GmbH, Amphenol Corp., Tekno Hose SpA, KEMET Corp., Key Safety Systems Inc., ODW-Elektrik GmbH, etc.

As of 2013, the manufacturing sector (including mining and construction) constituted the largest part of GDP at 21.4%, up from 21.1% in 2012. The trade, transportation and accommodation sector represents 18.2% of GDP in 2013, up from 16.7% in 2012, while agriculture represents 9.6%, up from 9.1% in the previous year.

In terms of foreign trade, the largest sector contributing to export in 2014 was "chemicals and related products" at 21.4%, followed by the "machinery and transport equipment" sector at 21.1%. Main import sectors in 2014 were "manufactured goods classified chiefly by material" with 34.2%, "machinery and transport equipment" with 18.7% and "mineral fuels, lubricants and related materials" with 14.4% of the total imports. Even 68.8% of the foreign trade in 2014 was done with the EU which makes the EU by far the largest trading partner (23.3% with Germany, 7.9% with the UK, 7.3% with Greece, 6.2% with Italy, etc.). Almost 12% of the total external trade in 2014 was done with the western Balkan countries. In 2007, the information technology market increased 63.8% year on year, which was the fastest growing in the Adriatic region.

North Macedonia has one of the highest shares of people struggling financially, with 72% of its citizens stating that they could manage on their household's income only "with difficulty" or "with great difficulty", though North Macedonia and Croatia were the only countries in the western Balkans to not report an increase in this statistic. Corruption and a relatively ineffective legal system also act as significant restraints on successful economic development. North Macedonia still has one of the lowest per capita GDPs in Europe. The grey market is estimated at close to 20% of GDP. PPS GDP per capita stood at 36% of the EU average in 2017. With a GDP per capita of US$9,157 at purchasing power parity and a Human Development Index of 0.701, North Macedonia is less developed and has a considerably smaller economy than most of the former Yugoslav states.

=== Trade ===
The outbreak of the Yugoslav wars and the imposition of sanctions on Serbia and Montenegro caused great damage to the economy, with Serbia constituting 60% of its markets before the disintegration of Yugoslavia. When Greece imposed a trade embargo on the republic in 1994–95, the economy was also affected. Some relief was afforded by the end of the Bosnian War in November 1995 and the lifting of the Greek embargo, but the Kosovo War of 1999 and the 2001 Albanian crisis caused further destabilisation.

Since the end of the Greek embargo, Greece has become the most important business partner. Many Greek companies have bought former state companies in North Macedonia, such as the oil refinery Okta, the baking company Zhito Luks, a marble mine in Prilep, textile facilities in Bitola, etc., and employ 20,000 people. The moving of business to North Macedonia in the oil sector has been caused by the rise of Greece in the oil markets. Other key partners are Germany, Italy, the United States, Slovenia, Austria and Turkey.

=== Tourism ===
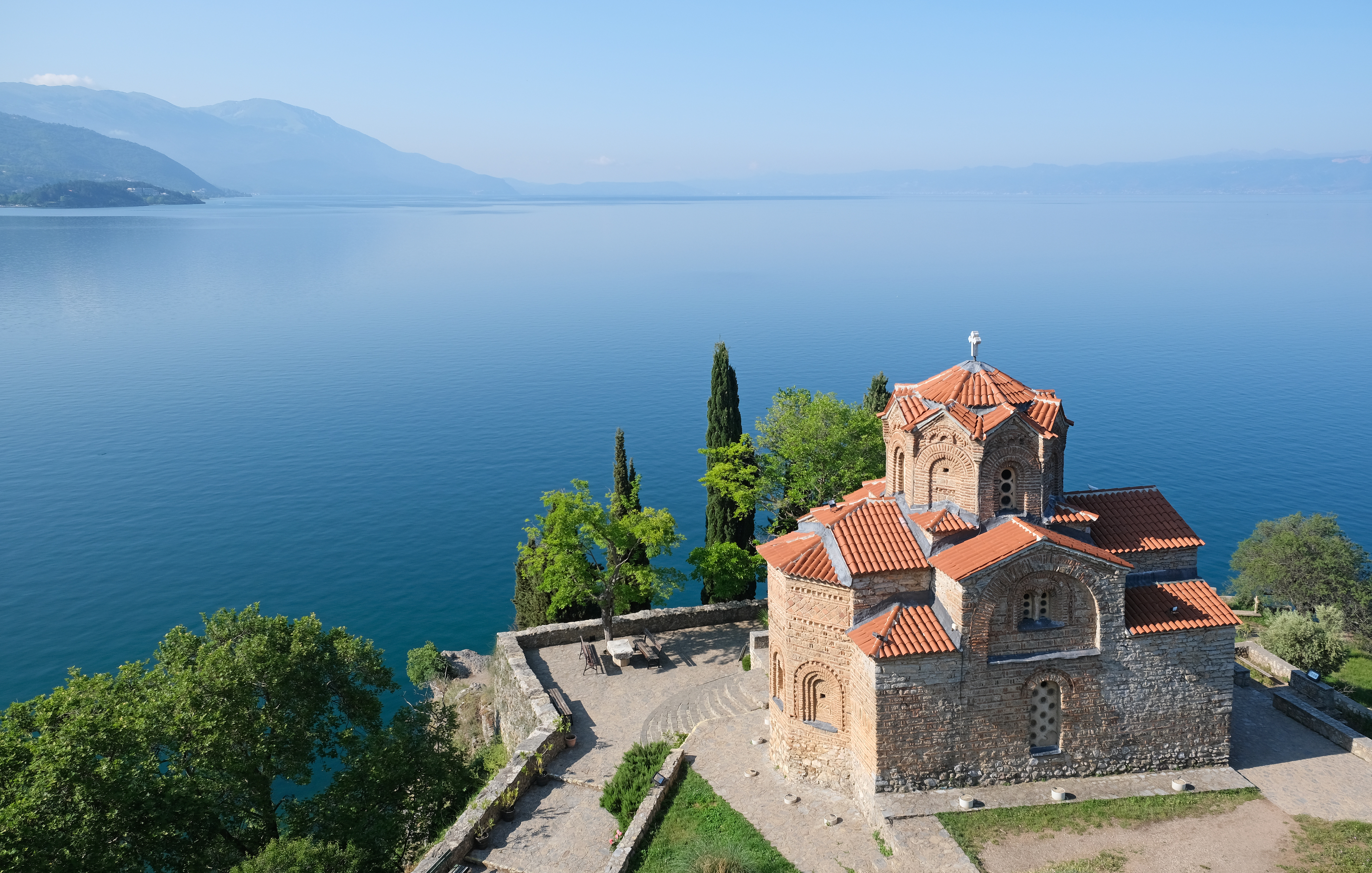
The church of St. John at Kaneo and Lake Ohrid, one of the most popular tourist destinations in North Macedonia

Tourism in North Macedonia accounts for 6.7% of its GDP in 2016, with an income of 38.5 billion denars (€616 million). Following its independence, the most serious negative impact on tourism performance occurred from the armed conflicts in 2001. The number of foreign visitors has been on the rise since, with a 14.6% increase in 2011. In 2019, North Macedonia received 1,184,963 tourist arrivals. Most tourists from Turkey, neighbouring Serbia, Greece and Bulgaria, Poland and other countries of Western Europe. Approximately 60% of the tourism in 2017 visited Skopje and the southwestern region.

The most significant tourism branches are lake tourism as there are three lakes in Ohrid, Prespa and Dojran and over 50 small glacial lakes of variable sizes, mountainous tourism as there are 16 mountains higher than 2,000 metres. Other forms of tourism also include rural and ecotourism, city tourism and cultural tourism, represented through gastronomy, traditional music, cultural celebrations and cultural heritage sites.

=== Transport ===
Map of current and planned highways

The main transport links connect the different parts of the peninsula (trans-Balkan links). Particularly important is the connection between north–south and Vardar valley, which connects Greece with the rest of Europe. As of 2019, there were 10,591 km (6,581 mi) of roads, of which about 6,000 km (3,700 mi) were paved.

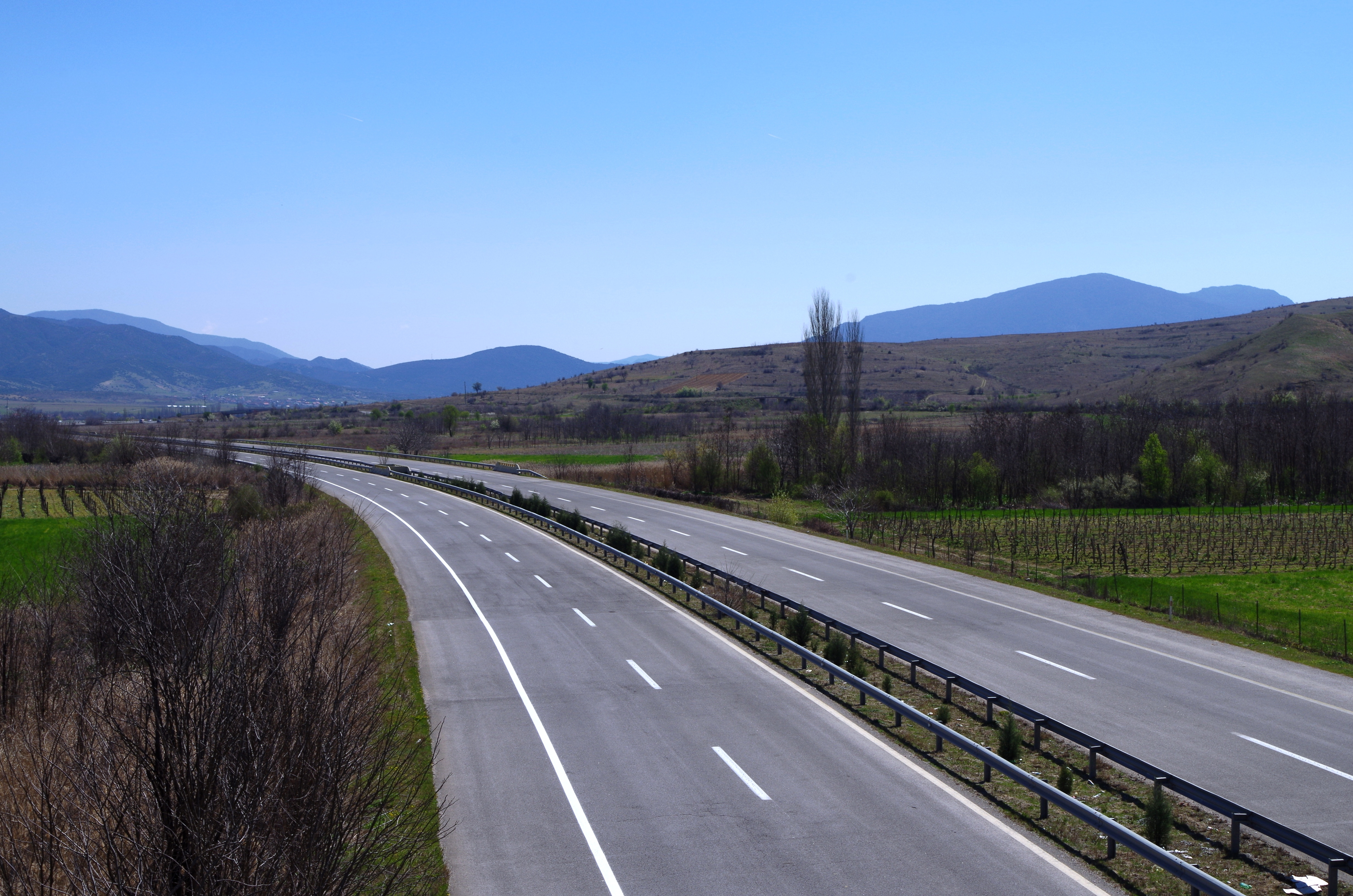
European route E75 in North Macedonia

As of 2019, the total length of the railway network was 922 km (573 mi). Operated by Makedonski Železnici, the most important railway line is the line on the border with Serbia–Kumanovo–Skopje–Veles–Gevgelija–border with Greece. The Beljakovci railway line provides a connection between Bulgaria and Skopje-Sofia. Railway hubs are in Skopje, Veles, and Kumanovo.

As far as water transport is concerned, only lake traffic through Ohrid and Prespan Lake has been developed, mostly for tourist purposes. There are officially 17 airports, of which 11 are with solid substrates. Two are international airports: Skopje International Airport and Ohrid St. Paul the Apostle Airport.

=== Post and telecommunications ===
North Macedonia Post is the state-owned company for the provision of postal services. It was founded in 1992 as PTT Macedonia. In 1993 it was admitted to the World Postal Union. In 1997, PTT Macedonia was divided into Macedonian Telekom and Macedonian Post (later renamed North Macedonia Post).

== Demographics ==
The results from the last 2021 census show a population of 1,836,713. The population density is 72.2 persons per km^{2} and the average age is 40.1 years. 598,632 households were recorded with an average number of household members of 3.1. The gender balance is 50.4% female to 49.6% male.

Based on the 2021 census data, the largest ethnic group are the ethnic Macedonians. The second-largest group are the Albanians, who dominated much of the northwestern part of the country. Following them, Turks are the third-biggest ethnic group.

=== Cities ===
Largest cities or towns in North Macedonia
Rank	Name	Region	Pop.	Rank	Name	Region	Pop.
1	Skopje	Skopje Statistical	526,502	11	Kavadarci	Vardar Statistical	32,038
2	Kumanovo	Northeastern Statistical	75,051	12	Kočani	Eastern Statistical	24,632
3	Bitola	Pelagonia Statistical	69,287	13	Kičevo	Southwestern Statistical	23,428
4	Prilep	Pelagonia Statistical	63,308	14	Gevgelija	Southeastern Statistical	15,156
5	Tetovo	Polog Statistical	63,176	15	Struga	Southwestern Statistical	15,009
6	Štip	Eastern Statistical	42,000	16	Radoviš	Southeastern Statistical	14,460
7	Veles	Vardar Statistical	40,664	17	Kriva Palanka	Northeastern Statistical	13,481
8	Ohrid	Southwestern Statistical	38 818	18	Negotino	Vardar Statistical	12,488
9	Strumica	Southeastern Statistical	33,825	19	Debar	Southwestern Statistical	11,735
10	Gostivar	Polog Statistical	32,814	20	Sveti Nikole	Eastern Statistical	11,728

=== Languages ===
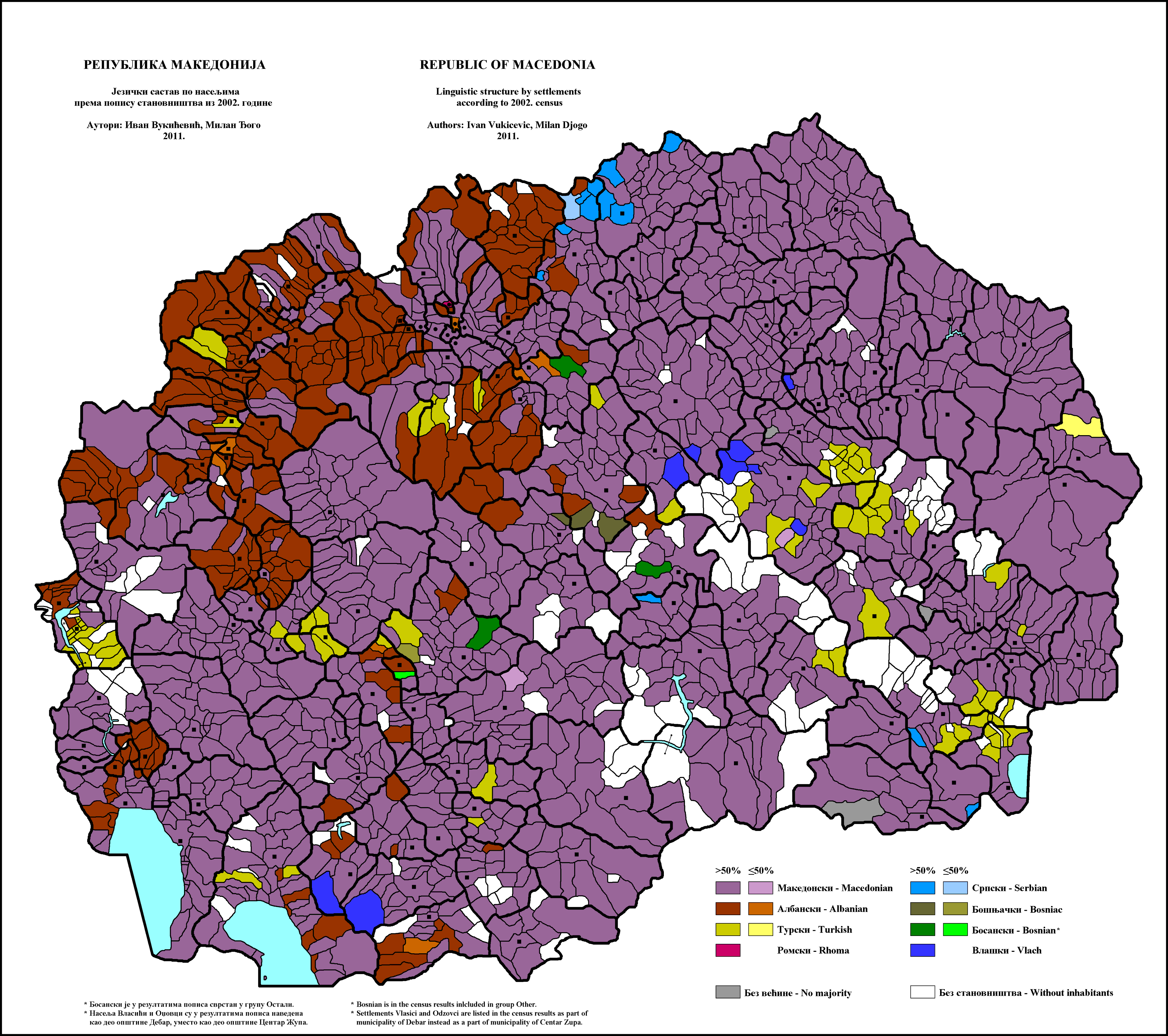
Linguistic map of North Macedonia, 2002 census

The national and official language is the Macedonian language. Since 2019, Albanian is co-official at a state level (excluding defence, central police and monetary policy). Macedonian belongs to the Eastern branch of the South Slavic language group, while Albanian occupies an independent branch of the Indo-European family of languages. In municipalities where at least 20% of the population is part of another ethnic minority, those individual languages are used for official purposes in local government, alongside Macedonian and Albanian or just Macedonian.

Macedonian is closely related to and mutually intelligible with standard Bulgarian. It also has some similarities with standard Serbian and the intermediate Torlakian/Shop dialects spoken mostly in southeastern Serbia and western Bulgaria (and by speakers in the northeastern corner of the country). The standard language was codified in the period following World War II and has accumulated a thriving literary tradition.

Minority languages with substantial numbers of speakers are Turkish (including Balkan Gagauz), Romani, Serbian/Bosnian and Aromanian (including Megleno-Romanian). Macedonian Sign Language is the primary language of those of the deaf community who did not pick up an oral language in childhood. According to the last census, 1,344,815 citizens of North Macedonia declared that they spoke Macedonian, 507,989 declared Albanian, 71,757 Turkish, 38,528 Romani, 24,773 Serbian, 8,560 Bosnian, 6,884 Aromanian and 19,241 spoke other languages.

=== Religion ===
Religion in North Macedonia (2021)
1. Eastern Orthodoxy (46.1%)
2. Catholicism (0.40%)
3. Non-specified Christian (presumably Orthodox) (13.9%)
4. Islam (32.2%)
5. None (0.10%)
6. Others (7.30%)

Eastern Orthodox Christianity is the most practiced religion, making up 46.1% of the population, the vast majority of whom belong to the Macedonian Orthodox Church. Various other Christian denominations account for 13.9% of the population. Muslims constitute 32.2% of the population. North Macedonia has the fifth-highest proportion of Muslims in Europe. Most Muslims are Albanians, Turks, Romani or Bosniaks; few are Macedonian Muslims. The remaining 1.4% was determined to be "unaffiliated" by a 2010 Pew Research estimation.

As of 2011, there were 1,842 churches and 580 mosques. The Orthodox and Islamic religious communities have secondary religion schools in Skopje. There is an Orthodox theological college in the capital. The Macedonian Orthodox Church has jurisdiction over 10 provinces (seven in the country and three abroad), has 10 bishops and about 350 priests. A total of 30,000 people are baptised in all the provinces every year.

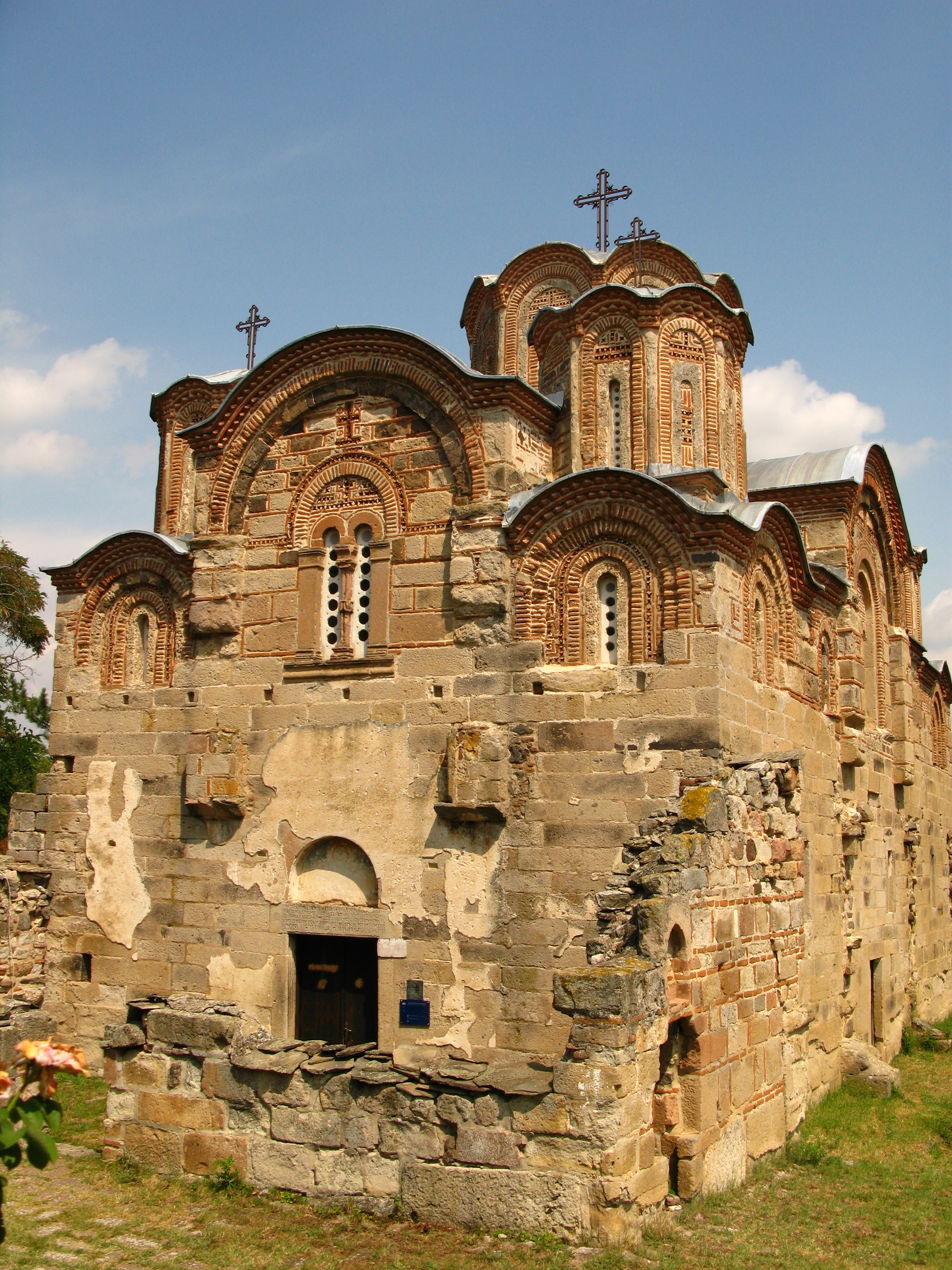
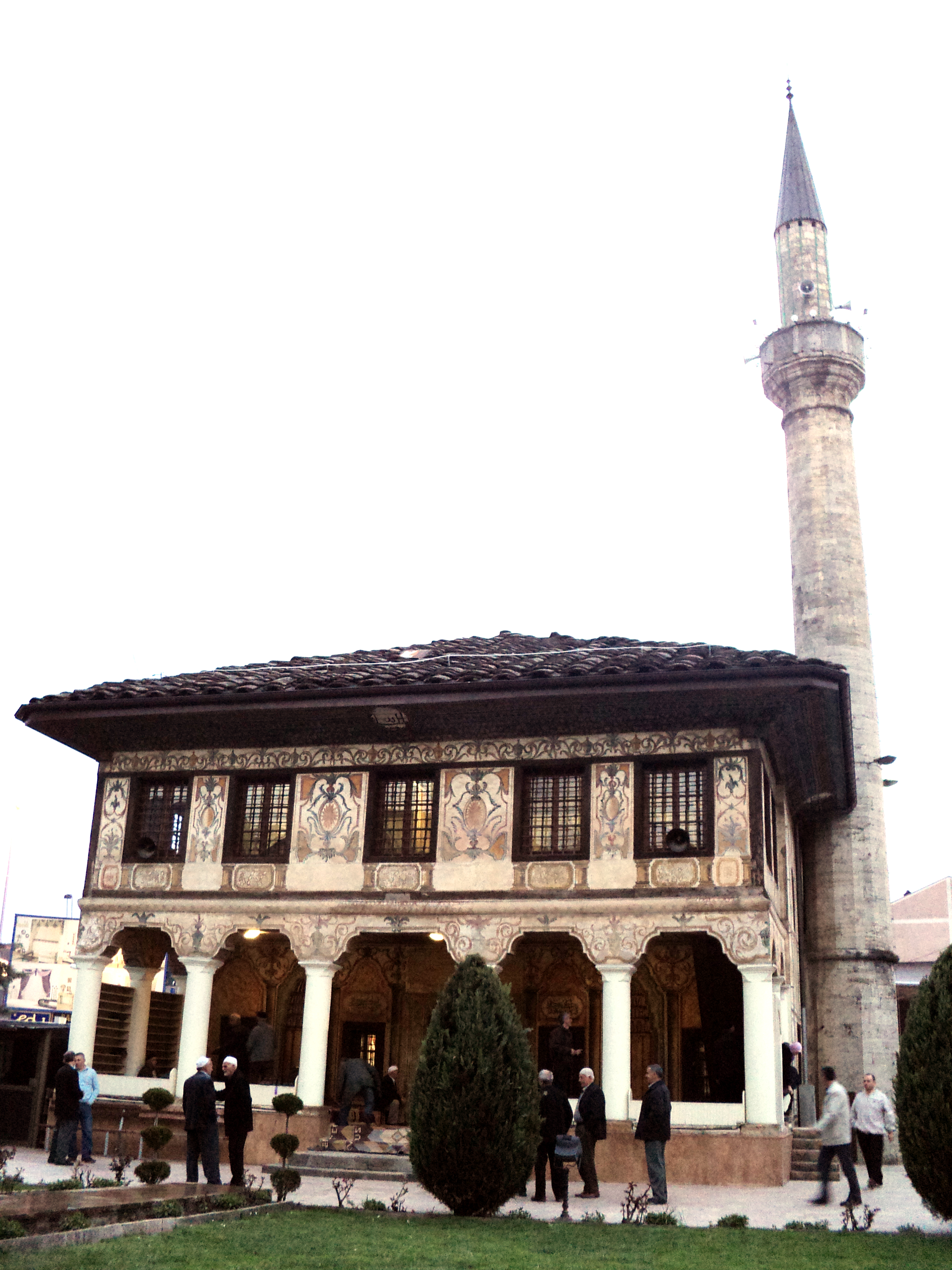
The Church of St. George in Kumanovo (left) and Šarena Džamija Mosque in Tetovo (right)

The Macedonian Orthodox Church, which declared autocephaly in 1967, remained unrecognised by the other Orthodox Churches until 2022 when it restored relations with the Serbian Orthodox Church and the Ecumenical Patriarchate, which has been followed by recognition from other churches.

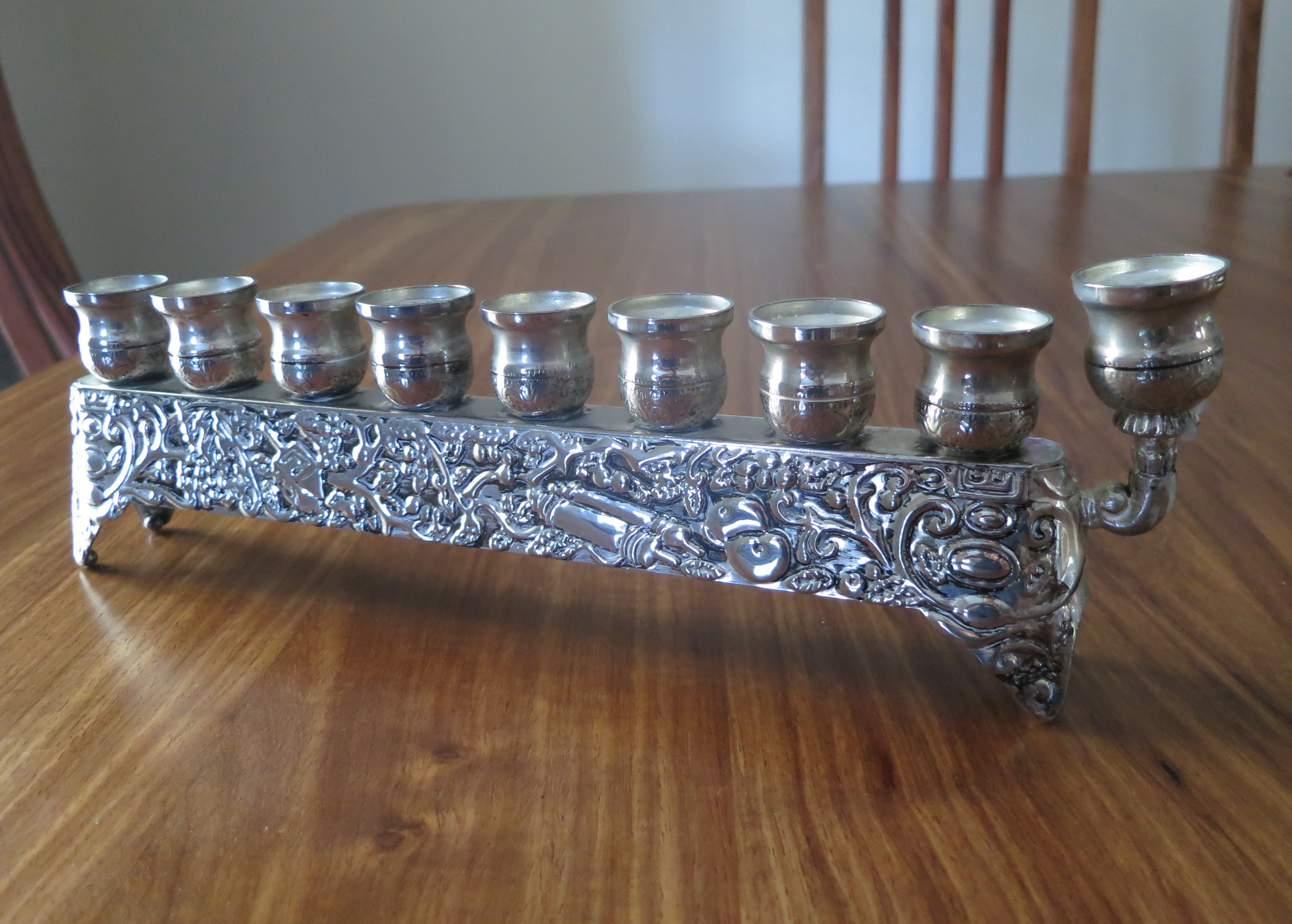
A 19th-century silver menorah

The Macedonian Byzantine Catholic Church has approximately 11,000 adherents. The church was established in 1918 and is made up mostly of converts to Catholicism and their descendants. The church is of the Byzantine Rite and is in communion with the Roman and Eastern Catholic Churches. Its liturgical worship is performed in Macedonian.

There is a small Protestant community. Former President Boris Trajkovski was a well-known Protestant. He was from the Methodist community, which is the largest and oldest Protestant church in the republic, dating back to the late 19th century. Since the 1980s the Protestant community has grown, partly through new confidence and partly with outside missionary help.

The country's Jewish community, which numbered some 7,200 people on the eve of World War II, was almost entirely destroyed during the war: only 2% survived the Holocaust. After their liberation and the end of the War, most opted to emigrate to Israel. Today, the Jewish community numbers approximately 200 persons, almost all of whom live in Skopje. Most Macedonian Jews are Sephardic—the descendants of 15th-century refugees who had been expelled from Castile, Aragon and Portugal.

=== Education ===
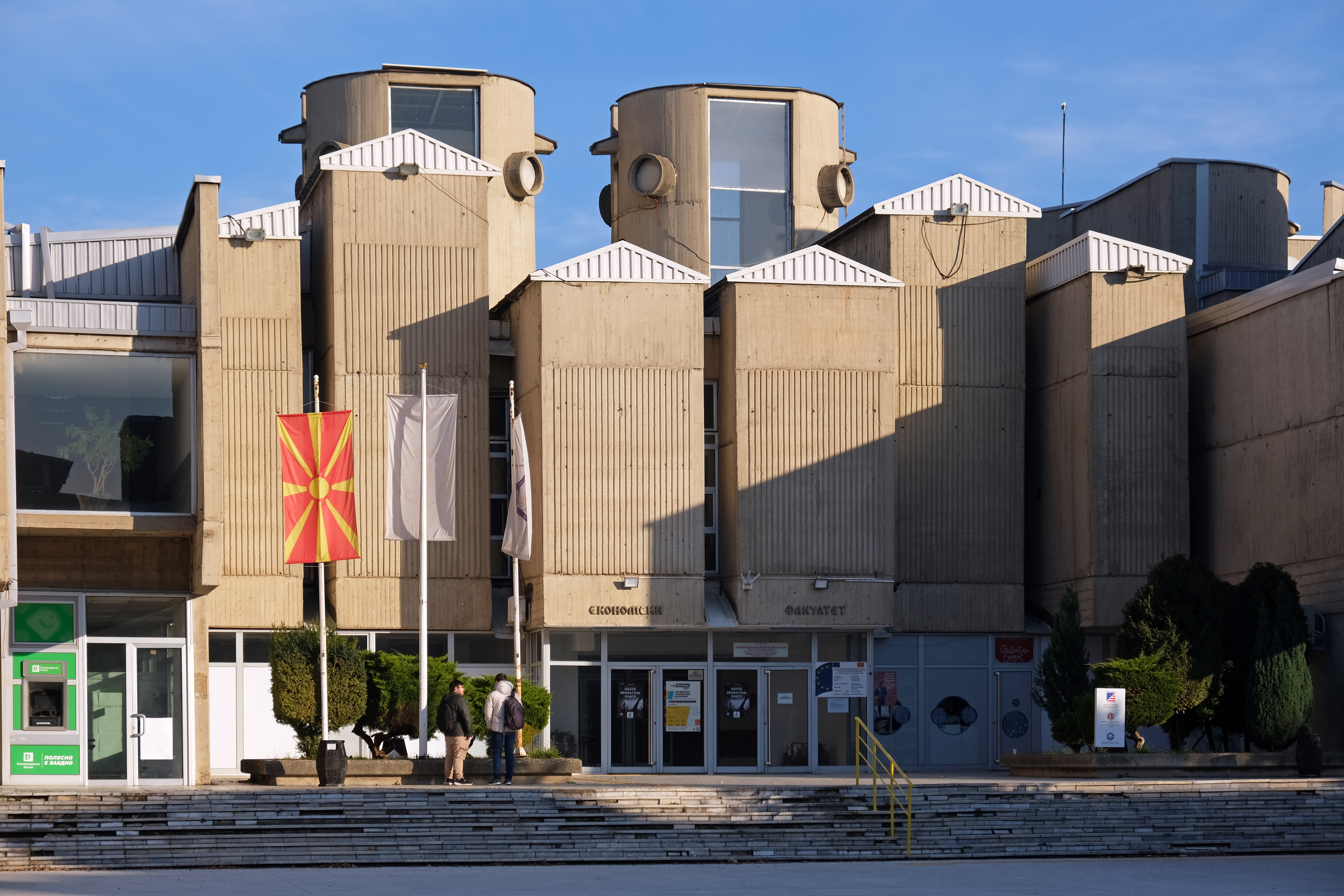
The Ss. Cyril and Methodius University in Skopje

The higher levels of education can be obtained at one of the five state universities: Ss. Cyril and Methodius University of Skopje, St. Clement of Ohrid University of Bitola, Goce Delčev University of Štip, State University of Tetova and University of Information Science and Technology "St. Paul The Apostle" in Ohrid. There are a number of private university institutions, such as the European University, Slavic University in Sveti Nikole, the South East European University and others. North Macedonia was ranked 63rd in the Global Innovation Index in 2025. The National and University Library "St. Kliment of Ohrid" is in Skopje.

== Culture ==
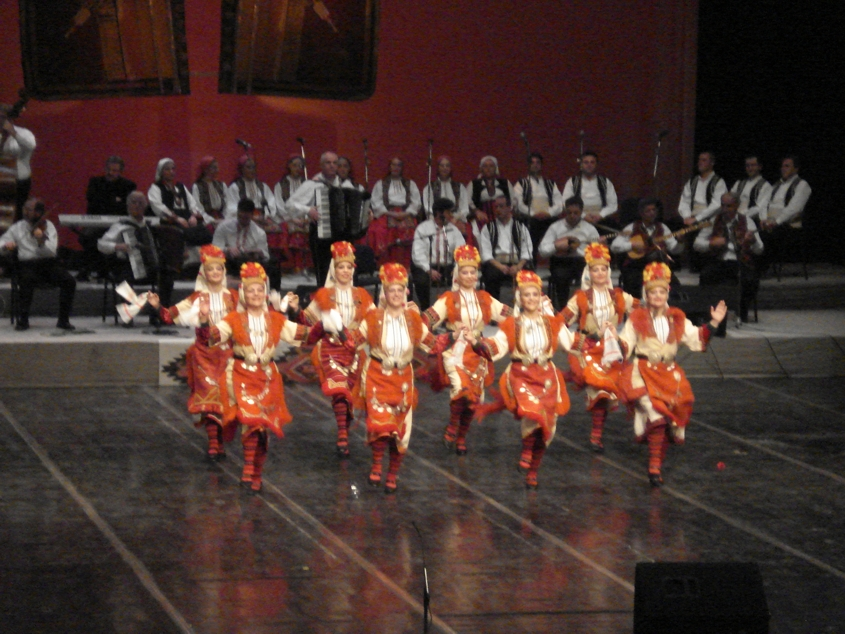
Folk dancers

North Macedonia has a rich cultural heritage in art, architecture, poetry and music. It has many ancient, protected religious sites. Poetry, cinema, and music festivals are held annually. Macedonian music styles developed under the strong influence of Byzantine church music. North Macedonia has a significant number of preserved Byzantine fresco paintings, mainly from the period between the 11th and 16th centuries. There are several thousands of square metres of fresco painting preserved, the major part of which is in very good condition and represent masterworks of the Macedonian school of ecclesiastical painting.

The most important cultural events are the Ohrid Summer Festival of classical music and drama, the Struga Poetry Evenings which gather poets from more than 50 countries in the world, International Camera Festival in Bitola, Open Youth Theatre and Skopje Jazz Festival in Skopje etc. The National Opera opened in 1947, then named "Macedonian Opera", with a performance of Cavalleria rusticana under the direction of Branko Pomorisac. Every year, the May Opera Evenings are held in Skopje for around 20 nights. The first May Opera performance was that of Kiril Makedonski's Tsar Samuil in May 1972.

=== Media ===
The oldest newspaper is Nova Makedonija from 1944. Other well known newspaper and magazines are: Utrinski vesnik, Dnevnik, Vest, Fokus, Večer, Tea Moderna, Makedonsko Sonce, and Koha. Public channel is Macedonian Radio Television founded in 1993 by the Assembly of North Macedonia. TEKO TV (1989) from Štip is the first private television channel in the country. Other popular private channels are: Sitel, Kanal 5, Telma, Alfa TV, and Alsat-M.

=== Cinema ===
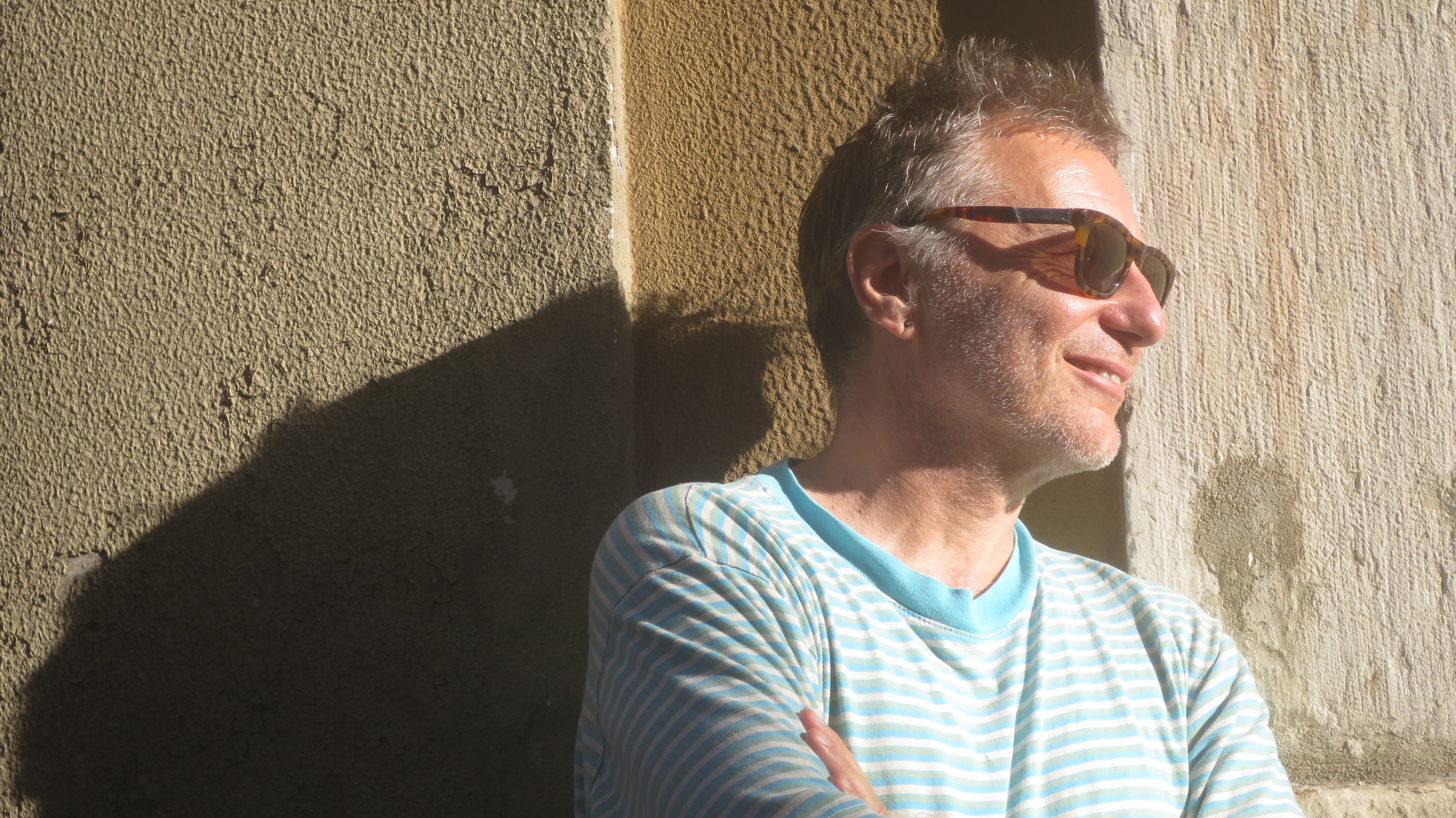
Milcho Manchevski is a critically acclaimed Macedonian film and TV director who won the Golden Lion at Venice Film Festival.

The history of film making dates back over 110 years. The first film to be produced in the territory was made in 1895 by Janaki and Milton Manaki in Bitola. Throughout the past century, the medium of film has depicted the history, culture and everyday life of the Macedonian people. Over the years many Macedonian films have been presented at film festivals around the world and several of these films have won prestigious awards.

The first Macedonian feature film was Frosina, released in 1952 and directed by Vojislav Nanović. The first feature film in colour was Miss Stone (1958), a movie about a Protestant missionary in Ottoman Macedonia. The highest grossing feature film in North Macedonia was Bal-Can-Can, having been seen by over 500,000 people in its first year alone. In 1994, Milcho Manchevski's film Before the Rain was nominated for an Academy Award in the category of Best International Feature Film. Manchevski continues to be the most prominent modern filmmaker in the country having subsequently written and directed Dust and Shadows. In 2020, the documentary Honeyland (2019) directed by Tamara Kotevska and Ljubomir Stefanov, received nominations in the categories for Best International Feature Film and Best Documentary Feature at the 92nd Academy Awards, making it the first non-fictional film to receive a nomination in both categories.

=== Cuisine ===
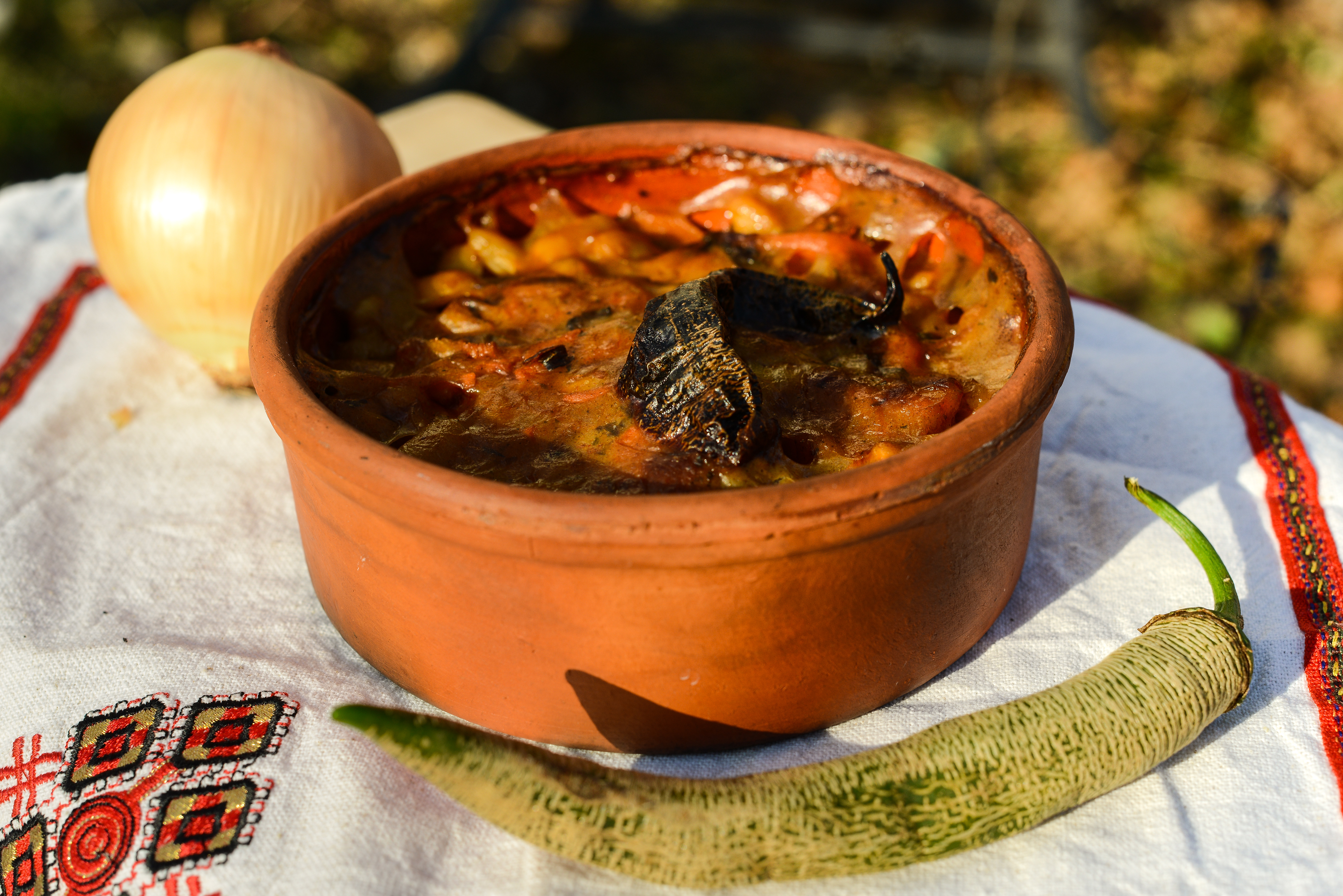
Tavče gravče

Macedonian cuisine is representative of the Balkans, incorporating Mediterranean and Middle Eastern (Ottoman), and to a lesser extent Italian, German and Eastern European (especially Hungarian) influences. The relatively warm climate provides excellent growth conditions for a variety of vegetables, herbs and fruits.

Macedonian cuisine contains a number dairy products, wines, and local alcoholic beverages, such as rakija. Tavče gravče and mastika are the national dish and drink of North Macedonia, respectively. Some other important dishes include Šopska salad, an appetiser and side dish that accompanies the main meal, ajvar, stuffed peppers, pastrmajlija and others.

=== Sport ===
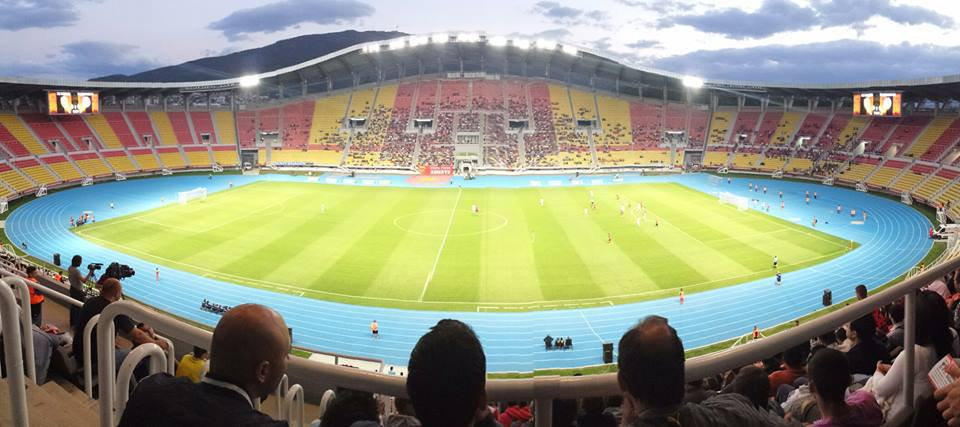
Toše Proeski Arena

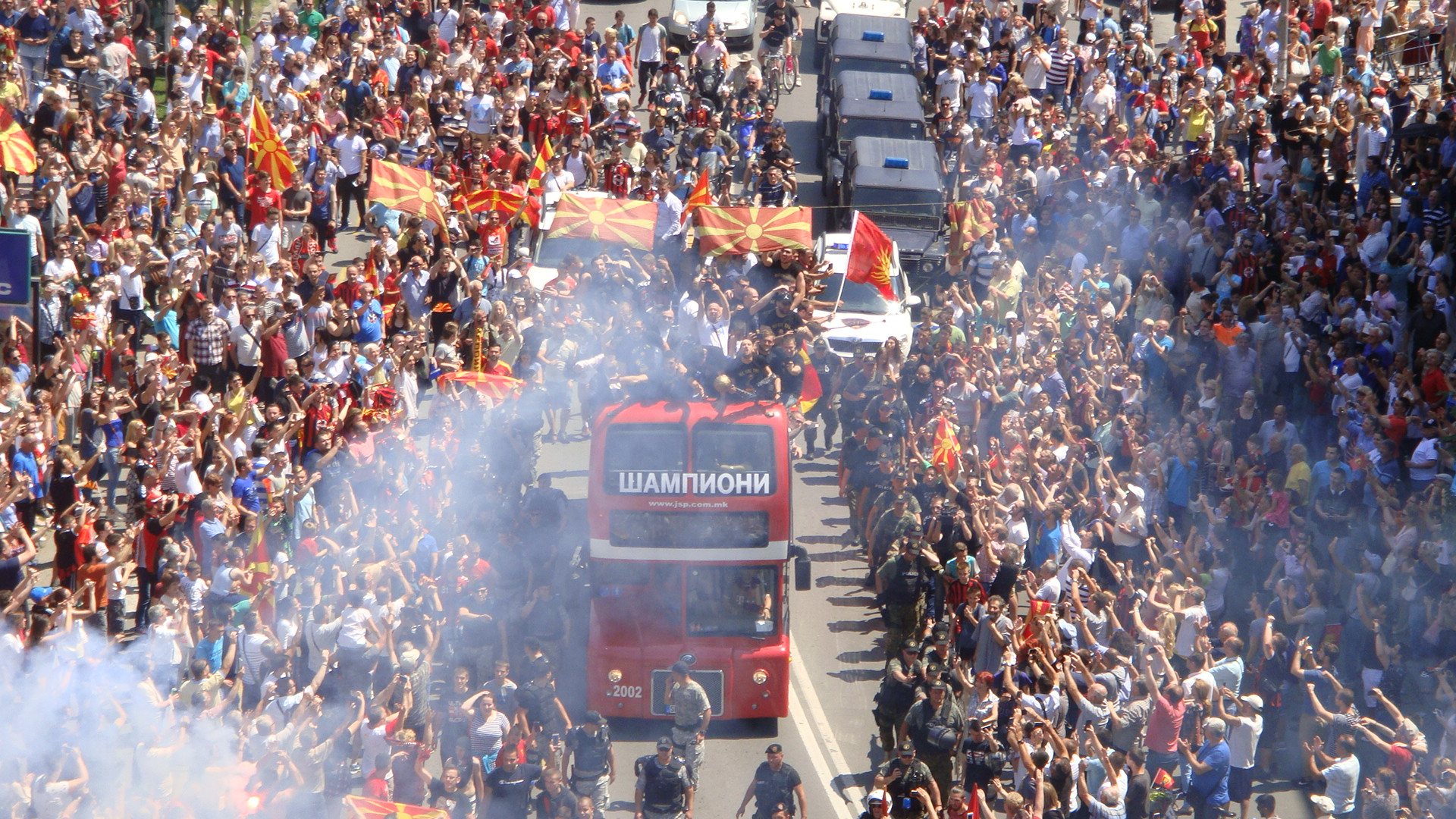
The welcoming ceremony for RK Vardar after winning the 2016–17 EHF Champions League

Football, handball, and basketball are the most popular sports. The North Macedonia national football team is controlled by the Football Federation of Macedonia. Their home stadium is the Toše Proeski Arena. In November 2003, to celebrate UEFA's jubilee, Darko Pančev was selected as the Golden Player of Macedonia as their most outstanding player of the past 50 years. He was the winner of the European Golden Boot award in 1991 and he is best known for scoring the winning penalty in the 1991 European Cup Final, bringing Red Star Belgrade the most prestigious trophy in European football for the first time in its 50-year existence. In 2020, the national team qualified for UEFA Euro 2020 (held in 2021), their first major tournament in the country's history.

Macedonian handball clubs have enjoyed success in European competitions. RK Vardar won 2016–17 and 2018–19 EHF Champions League, while Kometal Gjorče Petrov Skopje won the 2002 EHF Women's Champions League. The 2008 European Women's Handball Championship took place in Skopje and Ohrid; the women's national team finished seventh place. The men's national team has appeared in the European and World championships multiple times, with a best finish of fifth at the former (2012) and ninth at the latter (2015).

The North Macedonia national basketball team is run by the Basketball Federation of North Macedonia, the governing body of basketball which was created in 1992 and joined FIBA in 1993. North Macedonia has participated in three EuroBaskets since then with its best finish at 4th place in 2011. It plays its home games at the Boris Trajkovski Sports Center in Skopje. Pero Antić became the first Macedonian basketball player to play in the National Basketball Association. He also won three EuroLeague trophies.

In the summer months the Ohrid Swimming Marathon is an annual event on Lake Ohrid, and during the winter months there is skiing in North Macedonia's winter sports centres. North Macedonia also takes part in the Olympic Games. Participation in the Games is organised by the Olympic Committee of North Macedonia. Magomed Ibragimov competed in the freestyle 85 kg competition at the 2000 Summer Olympics and won the bronze medal, which was the first medal since independence. Wrestlers Shaban Trstena and Shaban Sejdiu, as well as boxers Redžep Redžepovski and Ace Rusevski, won Olympic medals as part of Yugoslav Olympic team.

=== Public holidays ===
The main public holidays in North Macedonia are:

Date	English name	Macedonian name	Remarks
1–2 January	New Year	Нова Година, Nova Godina	
7 January	Christmas Day (Orthodox)	Прв ден Божиќ, Prv den Božiḱ	
April/May	Good Friday (Orthodox)	Велики Петок, Veliki Petok	Orthodox Easter and other Easter dates do not match; see: List of dates for Easter
April/May	Easter Sunday (Orthodox)	Прв ден Велигден, Prv den Veligden	
April/May	Easter Monday (Orthodox)	Втор ден Велигден, Vtor den Veligden	
1 May	Labour Day	Ден на трудот, Den na trudot	
24 May	Saints Cyril and Methodius Day	Св. Кирил и Методиј, Ден на сèсловенските просветители, Sv. Kiril i Metodij, Den na sèslovenskite prosvetiteli	
2 August	Republic Day	Ден на Републиката, Den na Republikata	Day when the Republic was established in 1944, also Ilinden Uprising in 1903.
8 September	Independence Day	Ден на независноста, Den na nezavisnosta	Day of independence from Yugoslavia
11 October	Day of the Macedonian Uprising	Ден на востанието, Den na vostanieto	Beginning of anti-fascist resistance during WWII in 1941
23 October	Day of the Macedonian Revolutionary Struggle	Ден на македонската револуционерна борба, Den na makedonskata revolucionarna borba	Day when the Internal Macedonian Revolutionary Organization (IMRO) was established in 1893.
1 Shawwal	Eid ul-Fitr	Рамазан Бајрам, Ramazan Bajram	moveable, see: Islamic Calendar
8 December	Saint Clement of Ohrid Day	Св. Климент Охридски, Sv. Kliment Ohridski	

Besides these, there are several major religious holidays and holidays of minorities.

=== Symbols ===
- Sun: The official flag of North Macedonia, adopted in 1995, is a yellow sun with eight broadening rays extending to the edges of the red field.
- Coat of arms: After independence in 1991, North Macedonia retained the coat of arms adopted in 1946 by the People's Assembly of the People's Republic of Macedonia on its second extraordinary session held on 27 July 1946, later on altered by article 8 of the Constitution of the Socialist Federal Republic of Macedonia. The coat-of-arms is composed by a double bent garland of ears of wheat, tobacco and poppy, tied by a ribbon with the embroidery of a traditional folk costume. In the centre of such a circular room there are mountains, rivers, lakes and the sun. All this is said to represent "the richness of our country, our struggle, and our freedom".

== International rankings ==
Organisation	Survey	Ranking
Institute for Economics and Peace	Global Peace Index 2019	65 out of 163
Reporters Without Borders	Worldwide Press Freedom Index 2019	95 out of 180
Transparency International	Corruption Perceptions Index 2019	106 out of 180
United Nations Development Programme	Human Development Index 2019	82 out of 189
World Bank	Ease of doing business index 2019	10 out of 190

== See also ==
- Outline of North Macedonia

== Bibliography ==
- Brunnbauer, Ulf. "'Pro‐Serbians' vs. 'Pro‐Bulgarians': Revisionism in Post‐Socialist Macedonian Historiography." History Compass 3.1 (2005). online Archived 20 June 2023 at the Wayback Machine
- Brunnbauer, Ulf. "Serving the Nation: Historiography in the Republic of Macedonia (FYROM) After Socialism." Historein 4 (2003): 161–182. online Archived 20 June 2023 at the Wayback Machine
- Georgieva, Valentina; Konechni, Sasha (1998). Historical Dictionary of the Republic of Macedonia. Scarecrow Press. ISBN 0-8108-3336-0.
- Marinov, Tchavdar. "Historiographical Revisionism and Re-Articulation of Memory in the Former Yugoslav Republic of Macedonia." Sociétés politiques comparées 25 (2010): 1-19. online Archived 22 July 2023 at the Wayback Machine
- Mattioli, Fabio (2020). Dark Finance: Illiquidity and Authoritarianism at the Margins of Europe. Stanford University Press. ISBN 978-1-5036-1294-5.
- Nicolle, David (2008). The Ottomans: Empire of Faith. Thalamus Publishing. ISBN 978-1-902886-11-4.* Tziampiris, Aristotle. "Greek Historiography and Slav-Macedonian National Identity." The Historical Review/La Revue Historique 8 (2011): 215-225. online
