= Paeonians =

Ancient Indo-European people from Paeonia

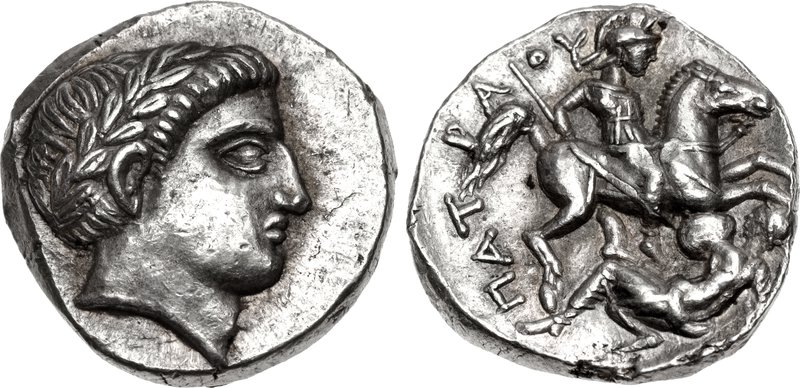
- Coin of Patraus, king of Paeonia in c. 335–315 BCE

Languages
- Paeonian

Paeonians or Paionians (Ancient Greek: Παίονες, romanized: Paíones) were an ancient Indo-European people that dwelt in Paeonia. Paeonia was an ancient country located north of Lower Macedonia, northeast of Pelagonia, south of Dardania, west of Thrace, and east of Illyria. Most of their land was in the Vardar river basin, roughly in what is today North Macedonia.

Paeonia in antiquity

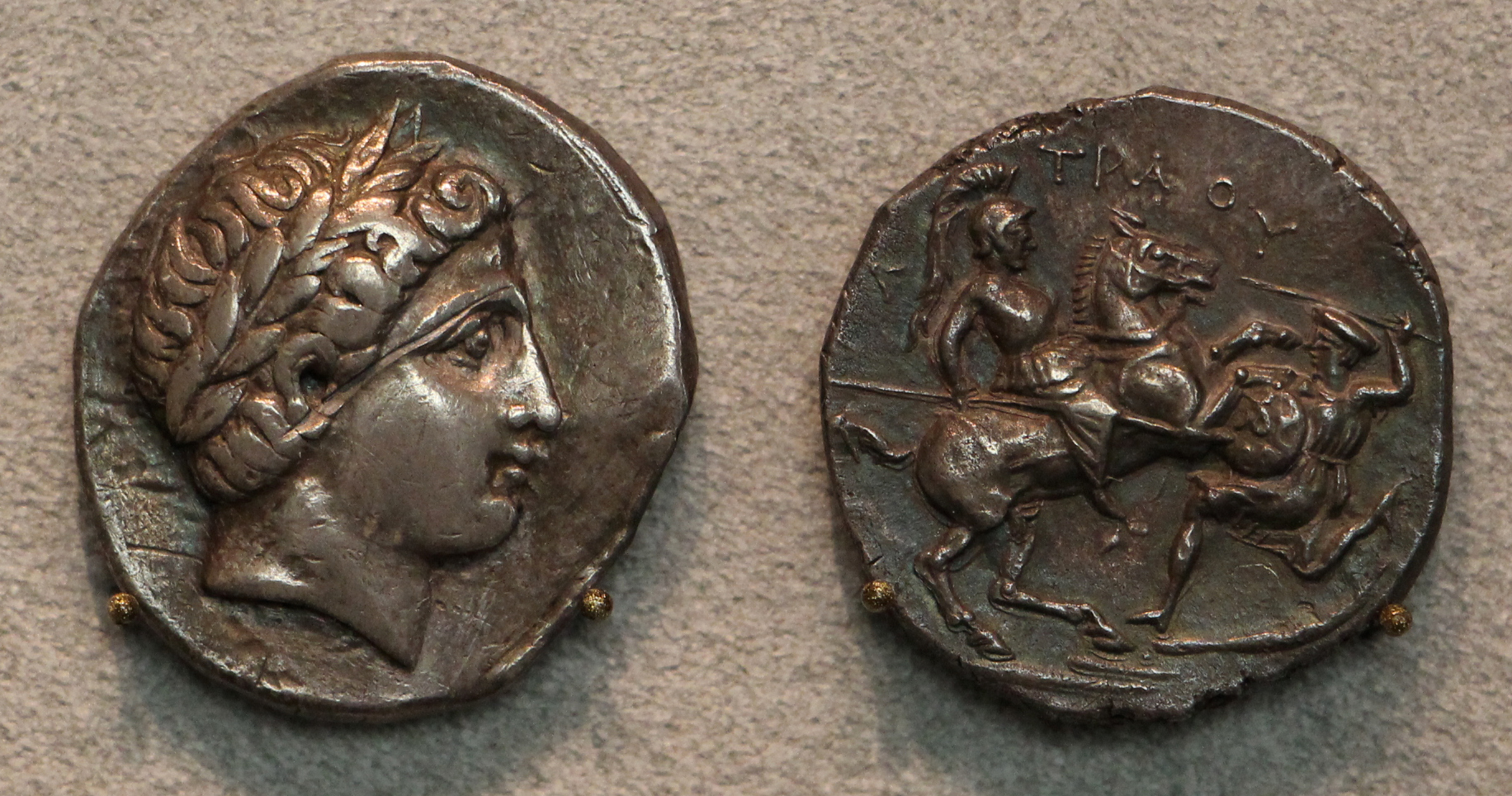
Coin of Patraus, king of Paeonia in c. 335–315 BCE

== Ethnolinguistic kinship ==
Modern linguists are uncertain as to the classification of Paeonian, due to the extreme scarcity of surviving materials in the language, with numerous hypotheses having been suggested about their language and their origins: Illyrian, Thracian, Brygian/Phrygian, ancient Greek and that their language was an ancient Greek dialect, or of mixed origins. According to Radoslav Katičić, the prevailing opinion is that they were of "Illyrian" origin, in the sense that they belonged to the same linguistic complex as the ancient people of the north-western Balkans. He asserts that the Paeonians were never Hellenes in any cultural sense, while the possibility that they took part in the Greek migration, remained behind on the route and consequently spoke a Greek dialect or a lost Indo-European language closely related to Greek, cannot be wholly ruled out. Katičić concludes that the Paeonians had no part in Hellenic culture nor in the Hellenic name, and that the Hellenes viewed them as northern barbarians.

According to their national legend, they were Teucrian colonists from Troy. Homer speaks of Paeonians from the Axios fighting on the side of the Trojans, but the Iliad does not mention whether the Paeonians were kin to the Trojans. Homer calls the Paeonian leader Pyraechmes (parentage unknown); later on in the Iliad (Book 21), Homer mentions a second leader, Asteropaeus, son of Pelagon.

Katičić notes that the ancient historian Appian mentioned a family tree, describing Paeon, the eponymous ancestor of the Paeonians, as the son of Autarieus, the eponym of the Illyrian Autariatae, and father of Skordiskos and Triballos, the eponyms of two central Balkanic tribes, one Celtic and the other Thracian. Katičić argues that this genealogy would connect the Paeonians with the Illyrian complex. However, he notes this is only true if Appian meant the Paeonians, since Appian used the same name to denote the Pannonians.

Pausanias described that Paeon was a brother of Epeius and Aetolus, the eponymous ancestors of the Epeians of Elis and the Aetolians respectively. According to Irwin L. Merker, this genealogy shows that the Ancient Greeks considered the Paionians to be of Hellenic stock. Anson writes that "this notice from Pausanias may suggest that at least by the second century AD the Paeonians were seen as part of the Greek community". Their place-name has several cognates in Greece such as Παιονίδαι (Paeonidai), a deme of the tribe Leontis in Attica. A place in the Argolid also has the same name.

Paeonian is considered a Paleo-Balkan language. Katičić argues that the available linguistic evidence for Paeonian is extremely scarce and contradictory, concluding that our knowledge of the language is so limited that any assertion regarding its linguistic affiliation seems meaningless. Athenaeus seems to have connected the Paeonian language to the barely-attested Mysian language. Mysian was possibly a member of the Anatolian branch in the Indo-European language family, or a member of the Phrygian language (languages of the Bryges, Phrygians, Western and Eastern Mushki).

== Culture ==
=== Religion ===
They worshipped the Sun in the form of a small round disk fixed on the top of a pole. They adopted the cult of Dionysus, known amongst them as Dyalus or Dryalus, and Herodotus mentions that the Thracian and Paeonian women offered sacrifice to Queen Artemis (probably Bendis).

=== Manners and customs ===
They drank barley beer and various decoctions made from plants and herbs.

The women were famous for their industry. In this connection Herodotus tells the story that Darius, having seen at Sardis a beautiful Paeonian woman carrying a pitcher on her head, leading a horse to drink, and spinning flax, all at the same time, inquired who she was. Having been informed that she was a Paeonian, he sent instructions to Megabazus, commander in Thrace, to deport two tribes of the nation without delay to Asia. An inscription, discovered in 1877 at Olympia on the base of a statue, states that it was set up by the community of the Paeonians in honor of their king and founder Dropion. Another king, whose name appears as Lyppeius on a fragment of an inscription found at Athens relating to a treaty of alliance, is no doubt identical with the Lycceius or Lycpeius of Paeonian coins.

== History ==
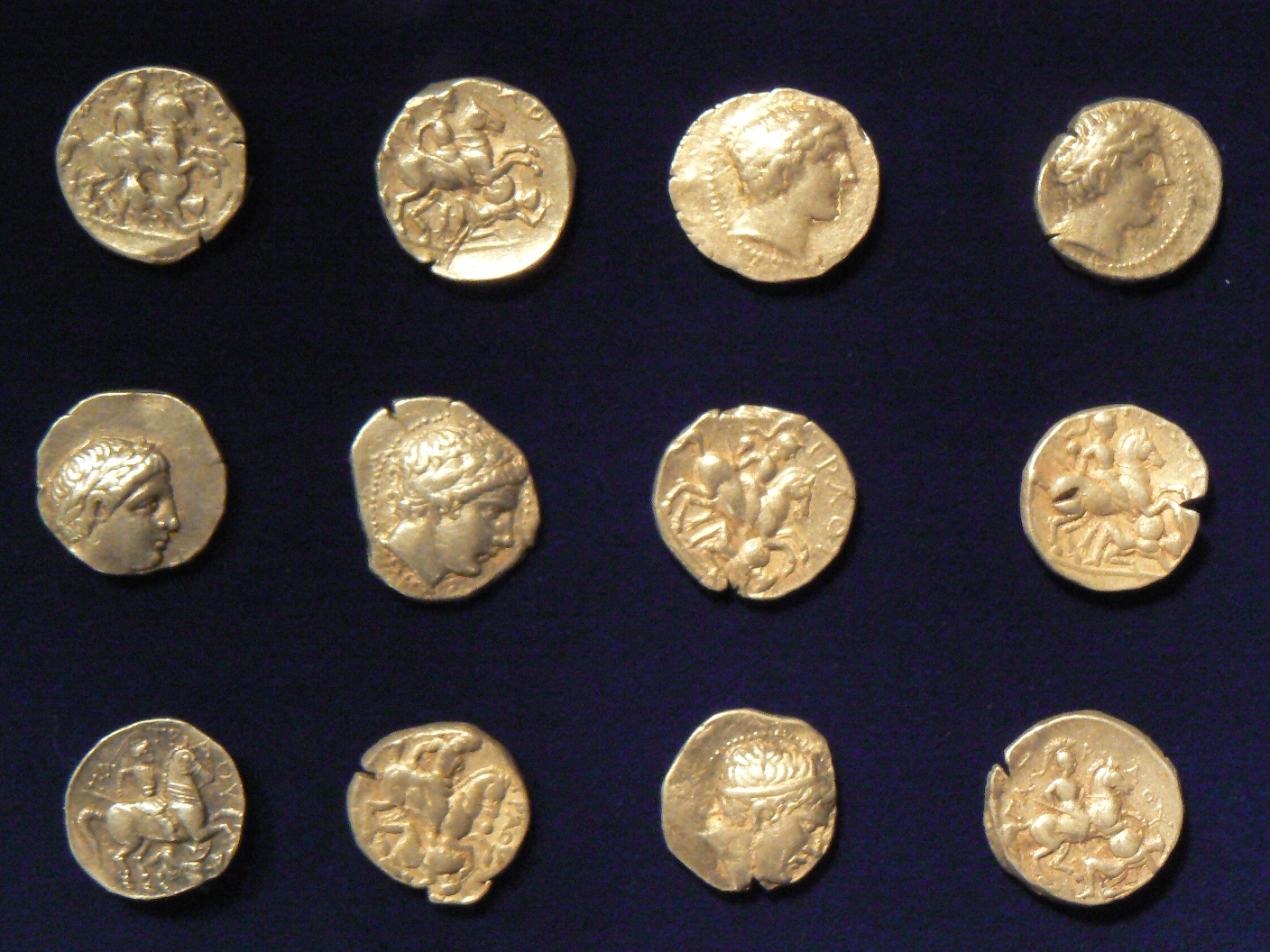
Paeonian silver tetradrachms dated back to the reign of Patraus

The first Paeonian settlement to be mentioned is Amydon by Homer in the Iliad. Polybius mentions that Emathia, roughly the later district between the Haliacmon and Axios in Lower Macedonia, was earlier called Paeonia, and Strabo, that it extended to Pieria and Pelagonia; these references are related to the Bronze Age period before the Trojan War according to N. G. L. Hammond. Before 1000 BCE, Paeonians must have settled in the lower Vardar basin as far south as Mygdonia, where Strabo places them in an area known as Amphaxitis. In classical antiquity, Paeonians lived from the middle to the lower Vardar river basin. The country of Paeonians had some important resources; it was rich in gold.

To the north and west, the Paeonians bordered Illyrian peoples but these borders were unstable. In particular, the border with the Dardani seems to have shifted several times between Stobi (Gradsko) and Bylazora. To their east, the Paeonians bordered Thracian peoples along the Bregalnica river, which seems to have formed the natural border between the Maedi and the Paeonians. Along the Lakavica river, a left-bank tributary of the Bregalnica, it is most likely Paeonian settlements were distributed. Their territory extended to the southeast up to the upper Strumica river basin (roughly the area of modern Strumica municipality) and bordered Sintice. An important Paeonian settlement in this region was Doberus which is mentioned in 429 BCE in the Odrysian campaign against Macedon by Sitalces. To their west and southwest along the Crna Reka river, the Paeonians who themselves probably occupied the lower Crna Reka border a number of Illyrian and upper Macedonian or Pelagonian peoples, while to the south the Brygian town of Skydra or Kydra was situated.

In the late 6th century BC, the Persians conquered Paeonians as far as Lake Prasias, including the Paeoplae and Siropaiones. Part of them were deported from Paeonia to Asia. Before the reign of Darius Hystaspes, they had made their way as far east as Perinthus in Thrace on the Propontis. At one time, all Mygdonia, together with Crestonia, was subject to them. When Xerxes crossed Chalcidice on his way to Therma (near Thessalonica), he is said to have marched through Paeonian territory. They occupied the entire valley of the Axios (Vardar) as far inland as Stobi, the valleys to the east of it as far as the Strymon and the country round Astibus and the river of the same name, with the water of which they anointed their kings. The Paeonians included several independent tribes, all later united under the rule of a single king to form the Kingdom of Paeonia.

To the south, Paeonians bordered ancient Macedonians. As a consequence of the growth of Macedonian power, and under pressure from their Thracian neighbors, their territory was considerably diminished in the 5th and 4th centuries BCE; it was limited to the lands north of Macedonia and from Illyria to the Strymon. Philip II of Macedon took advantage of the death of their king Agis and campaigned against them. Paeonia was made a Macedonian vassal in 356 BCE, during the course of Philip's Balkan campaigns. Although they retained their territory and the right to mint coins, the Paeonians were expected to provide both tribute and manpower for Macedonian military campaigns. This reduced the Paeonian Kingdom then ruled by Lyppeius to a semi-autonomous, subordinate status. A Paeonian cavalry contingent, led by Ariston, possibly brother of King Patraus and father of the later king Audoleon, was attached to Alexander the Great's army. Alexander the Great wished to bestow the hand of his sister Cynane upon Langarus, king of the Agrianians, who had shown himself loyal to Philip II. The expansion of the Macedonian state during the 4th century BCE resulted in the foundation of several new cities in southern Paeonia, including Idomenae and Antigonia.

Down to 227 BCE, at least seven Paeonian kings reigned, and during that period, Paeonia remained a distinct entity, either subject to Macedonia or independent. In 279 BCE, when the Gauls defeated Ptolemy Ceraunus and got as far as Delphi, it is certain that Paeonia was overrun and held for a time by their chieftain Brennus, but in the wake of the Celtic invasion, Leon reestablished the Paeonian kingdom. Antigonus Gonatas then annexed Paeonia into his kingdom. However, Irwin Merker suggests that when Demetrios II of Macedon and the Aetolian League were at war in the 230s BCE, the king of Paeonia Dropion "was involved as an ally of Aitolia." Additionally, he states that "when Demetrios or Antigonos Doson created the Macedonian Koinon he was imitated by his northern neighbor Dropion who hoped in this way both to modernize the constitution of his Kingdom and to increase the support of his subjects." In 227 BCE, Antigonus Doson conquered the southern part of Paeonia and founded the city of Antigoneia (near modern Negotino), and ten years after Philip V of Macedon conquered the rest by capturing Bylazora; after this, Perseis and Astraion were founded. The capture of Bylazora in 217 BCE by Philip V partly stabilized the northern Dardanian–Macedonian frontier.

In 168 BCE, Roman legions conquered Macedon in turn, and a new and much larger Roman province bearing this name was formed. Paeonia around the Axios, formed part of the second and third districts of the newly constituted Roman province of Macedonia, respectively. Centuries later under Diocletian, Paeonia and Pelagonia formed a province called Macedonia Secunda or Macedonia Salutaris, belonging to the Praetorian prefecture of Illyricum.

== Tribes ==
Paeonians and the Kingdom of Macedon

The Paeonian tribes (five or eight) were:

- Agrianes (also, Agriani and Agrii) (it is also claimed that this tribe was Thracian)
- Odomantes (also Odomanti) (it is also claimed that this tribe was Thracian)
- Derrones (also Derroni) (it is also claimed that this tribe was Thracian)
- Laeaeans (also Laeaei and Laiai)
- Doberes
- Paeoplae
- Siropaiones
- Almopians

== Notable Paeonians ==
=== Mythological ===
- Paeon (son of Endymion)
- Pyraechmes
- Asteropaeus

=== Historical ===
- Pigres of Paionia
- Agis of Paeonia
- Lycceius
- Patraus
- Ariston of Paeonia
- Langarus
- Audoleon
- Leon of Paeonia
- Dropion

== See also ==
- History of North Macedonia
- Paionia (municipality)

== Sources ==
- Duridanov, Ivan (1975). Die Hydronymie des Vardarsystems als Geschichtsquelle (PDF). Böhlau Verlag. ISBN 3412839736.
- Hatzopoulos, Miltiades B. (2020). Ancient Macedonia. De Gruyter. ISBN 978-3-11-071876-8.
- Katičić, Radoslav (2012) [1976]. Winter, Werner (ed.). Ancient Languages of the Balkans (Part 1). Trends in Linguistics: State-of-the-art Reports. Vol. 4. De Gruyter Mouton. ISBN 978-3-11-156887-4.
- Mallory, J. P. (1997). Encyclopedia of Indo-European Culture. Douglas Q. Adams. ISBN 1884964982.
