= Lyppeius =

King of Paeonia, 359/8 – c. 335 BC

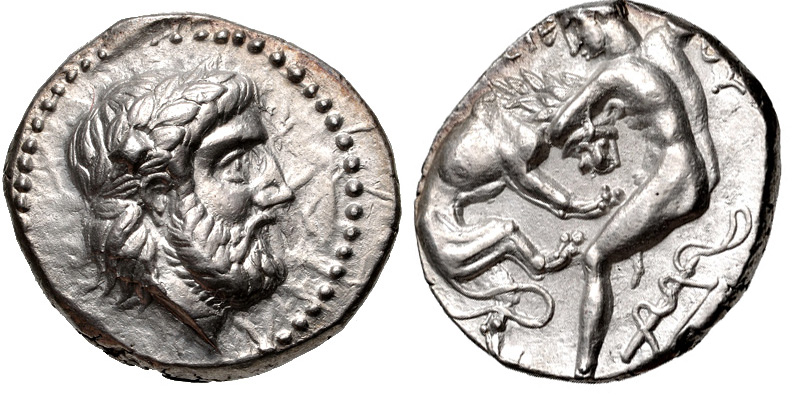
- Silver tetradrachm struck sometime during Lyppeius' reign. Obv.: Zeus facing right; rev.: Heracles with Nemean Lion in a strangle-hold.

King of Paeonia
- Reign: 359/8–c. 335 BC
- Predecessor: Agis
- Successor: Patraus
- Born: ?
- Died: c. 335 BC
- Religion: Ancient Greek religion

Lyppeius (Note: Sometimes rendered as Lycceus, Lykpeios, or Lykkeios in modern scholarship) (Ancient Greek: Λύππειον, romanized: Lúppeion) was king of the ancient kingdom of Paeonia from 359/8 until his death around 335 BC.

== Early life ==
He succeeded the first known Paeonian king, Agis of Paeonia, under unknown circumstances, and it is speculated that he may have been his son.

The majority of information about Lyppeius revolves around his conflict with his southern neighbor, Philip II of Macedon. Shortly after Philip's chaotic accession in 359/8, following the death in battle of his brother Perdiccas III, he was forced to bribe the Paeonians to abandon their invasion of Macedonia. The payment, judged as small by modern historians, may have been made with promises of future tribute from Macedonia, but this never materialized.

== War with Macedon ==
Instead, Philip reformed the army and invaded Paeonia after learning about the death of Agis, perhaps in the spring of 358. The details of the subsequent battle are unknown, but apparently the Paeonians, now led by Lyppeius, met Philip's 10,000 strong force in a pitched battle and were defeated. According to Diodorus, they were then forced to swear allegiance to the Macedonians.

In late 357, in an attempt to curb Philip's relentless expansion, Athens entered into an anti-Macedonian coalition with King Grabus II of Illyria, the Thracian kings, Olynthus, and Lyppeius. These efforts proved fruitless, however, as Philip neutralized each of Athen's partners one-by-one.

== Aftermath ==
Lyppeius was consequently reduced to a vassal status for the remainder of his reign, but he evidently retained a degree of independence as he continued to mint coins in his own name. He was succeeded by Patraus.

== See also ==
- Ariston of Paeonia
- Audoleon
