= Dropion =

King of Paeonia
- Reign: 250–230 BC
- Predecessor: Leon of Paionia
- Died: 230 BC
- Religion: Ancient Greek religion

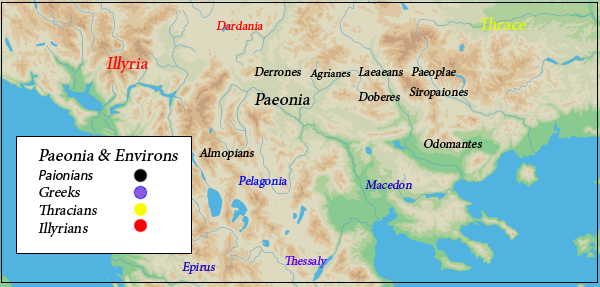
Paeonia; tribes and environs

Dropion (Greek: Δροπίων; 250–230 BC) was the last known Paeonian king.

== History ==
He was the son of Leon of Paionia.

Irwin Merker suggests that when Demetrios II and the Aetolian League were at war, "Dropion was involved as an ally of Aitolia." Additionally, he states that "when Demetrios or Antigonos Doson created the Macedonian Koinon he was imitated by his northern neighbor Dropion who hoped in this way both to modernize the constitution of his Kingdom and to increase the support of his subjects."

In 230 BC, the Dardanians captured Bylazora.

== Inscription ==
An inscription, discovered in 1877 at Olympia on the base of a statue, states that it was set up by the community of the Paeonians in honor of their king and founder Dropion.

== See also ==
- Aetolia
- Kingdom of Dardania
- Longarus
