= Doberes (Paeonian tribe) =

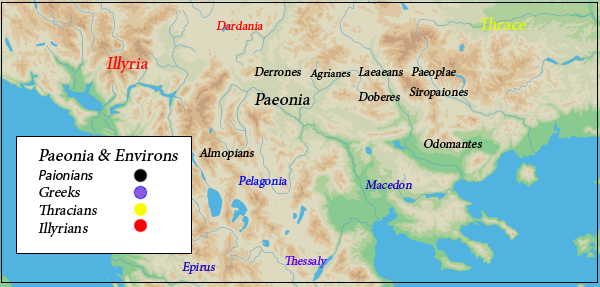
Paeonian tribes and environs

Doberes (Ancient Greek: Δόβηρες; Latin: Doberi) were an ancient Paeonian tribe.

== History ==
Herodotus describes the Doberes as inhabiting, with the Paeoplae, the country to the north of Mount Pangaeum; these being precisely the tribes whom he had before associated with the inhabitants of Lake Prasias. Their position must therefore be sought to the west of the Strymon river. They shared Mt. Pangaeum with the other Paeonians and Pierians, and dwelt probably on the north side, where, in the time of the Roman Empire, there was a mutatio, or place for changing horses, on the Via Egnatia, called Domeros, between Amphipolis and Philippi, 13 M. P. from the former and 19 M. P. from the latter.

== See also ==
- Peltast
- Paionia
