= Norakos =

Norakos or Norak was an old Paionian city. The city was mentioned by Stephanus Byzantinus together with another Paeonian cities like Amidi, Dober and Bimaz. There is no further information about the city and its location.
