= Paeonian language =

Extinct Indo-European language of the Balkans

Paeonian
- Paionian
- Native to: Paeonia
- Region: North Macedonia, northern Greece, western Bulgaria
- Ethnicity: Paeonians
- Extinct: Late antiquity
- Language family: Indo-European: (unclassified); Paeonian

Language codes
- ISO 639-3: None (mis)
- Linguist List: 0iz
- Glottolog: None

Paeonian, sometimes spelled Paionian, is a poorly attested, extinct Indo-European language spoken by the ancient Paeonians until late antiquity. Paeonia was located to the north of Pelagonia and Lower Macedonia, south of Dardania, west of Thrace, and east of the southernmost Illyrians.

== Classification ==
Classical sources usually considered the Paeonians distinct from the rest of the Paleo-Balkan people, comprising their own ethnicity and language. It is considered a Paleo-Balkan language but this is only a geographical grouping, not a genealogical one. Modern linguists are uncertain as to the classification of Paeonian, due to the extreme scarcity of surviving materials in the language, with numerous hypotheses having been published:

- Wilhelm Tomaschek and Paul Kretschmer have put forward an "Illyrian" hypothesis (i.e a part of the linguistic complex of the ancient north-western Balkans) which, according to Radoslav Katičić, seems to be the prevailing opinion.
- Dimitar Dečev and Susan Wise Bauer proposed a Thracian hypothesis.
- Vladimir I. Georgiev suggested a Phrygian affiliation.
- Karl Beloch, Ioannis Svoronos and Irwin L. Merker consider Paeonian an ancient Greek dialect, or a lost Indo-European language closely related to Greek, i.e. a Hellenic language, with a great deal of Thracian and Illyrian influence.
- Radoslav Katičić has said that "we know so little about their language that any linguistic affiliation seems meaningless".

Athenaeus seems to have connected the Paeonian language to the Mysian language, for which Strabo noted that it was, "in a way, a mixture of the Lydian and Phrygian languages".

== Paeonian vocabulary ==
Several Paeonian words are known from classical sources:

- μόναπος (monapos), the European bison
- τίλων (tilôn), a species of fish once found in Lake Prasias
- paprax, a species of fish once found in Lake Prasias. Paprakas, masc. acc. pl.

A number of anthroponyms (some known only from Paeonian coinage) are attested: Agis (Άγις), Patraos (Πατράος), Lycpeios (Λύκπειος), Audoleon (Αυδολέων), Eupolemos (Εὐπόλεμος), Ariston (Αρίστων), etc. In addition several toponyms (Bylazora (Βυλαζώρα), Astibos (Άστιβος) and a few theonyms Dryalus (Δρύαλος), Dyalos (Δύαλος), the Paeonian Dionysus, as well as the following:

- Pontos, effluent of the Strumica River, perhaps from *ponktos, 'boggy' (cf. German feucht, 'wet', Middle Irish éicne 'salmon', Sanskrit pánka 'mud', 'mire', Greek pontos 'passage', 'way');
- Idomenae (Ιδομένη) (nowadays near Gevgelija), name of a city (cf. Greek Idomeneus, proper name in Homer; "Ida", mountain in Crete);
- Stoboi (today Gradsko), name of a city, from *stob(h) (cf. Old Prussian stabis 'rock', Old Church Slavonic stoboru, 'pillar', Old English stapol, 'post', Ancient Greek stobos, 'scolding', 'bad language');
- Dysoron (Δύσορον and Δύσωρον, nowadays Dysoro, Δύσορο), name of a mountain, from dys- 'bad' (cf. Greek dyskolos 'difficult'), and oros 'mountain';
- Agrianes, name of a tribe, possibly from *agro- 'field' (cf. Latin ager, Greek ἀγρός agros, English acre) with cognates in the Greek tribe of Agraioi who lived in Aetolia, and the name of the month Agrianos which is found throughout the Dorian and Aeolian worlds.
