= Ariston of Paionia =

4th century BC member of the royal house of Paeonia

Ariston of Paeonia
- Born: 4th century BC; Paionia
- Died: 4th century BC
- Military career
- Allegiance: kingdom of Paeonia
- Branch: Army of Alexander the Great
- Rank: cavalry commander
- Unit: Paeonian cavalry
- Conflicts: Wars of Alexander the Great; Battle of Gaugamela
- Other work: member of the royal house of Paeonia

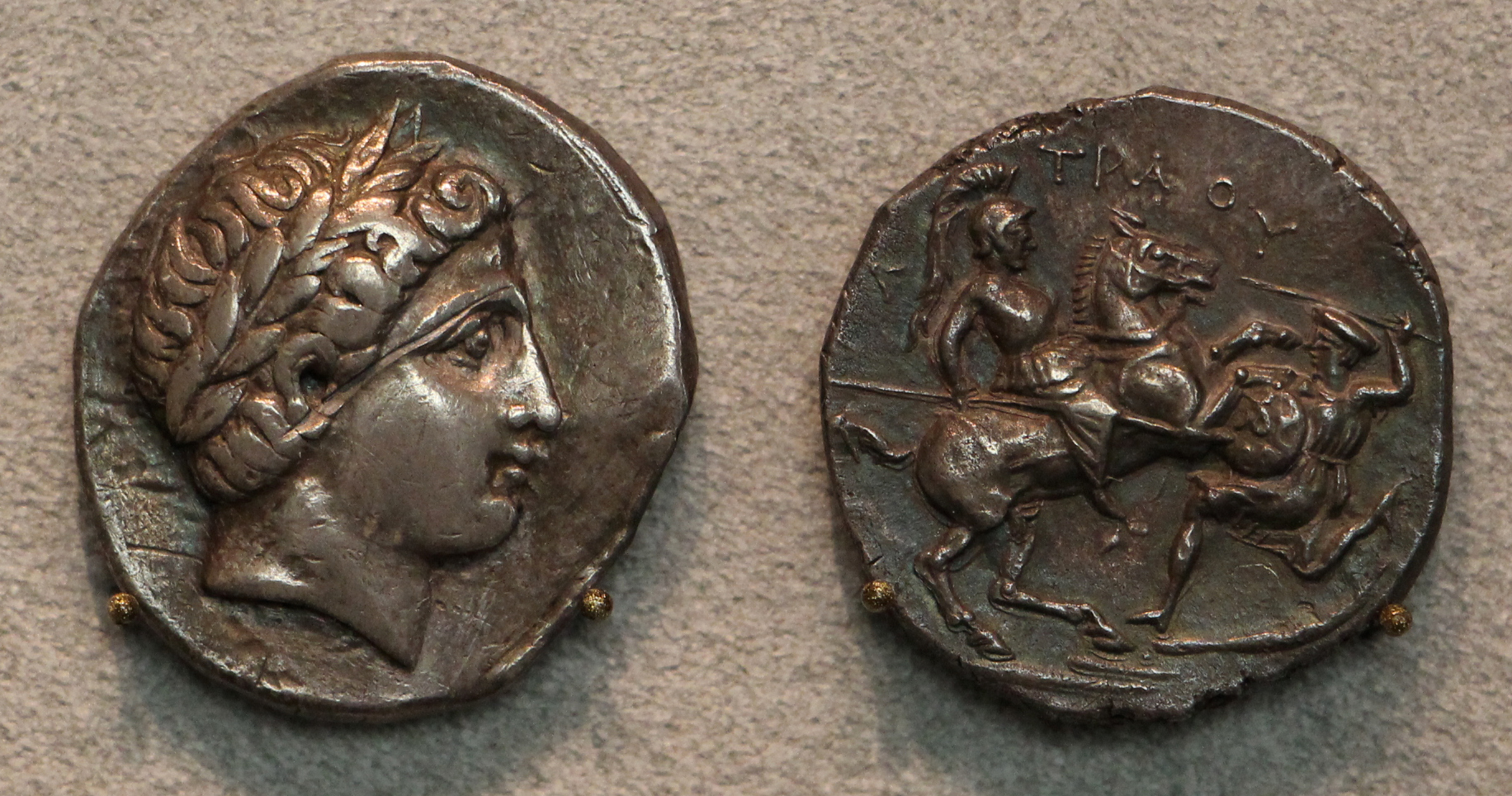
Coin of Patraus, possibly depicting Ariston in battle

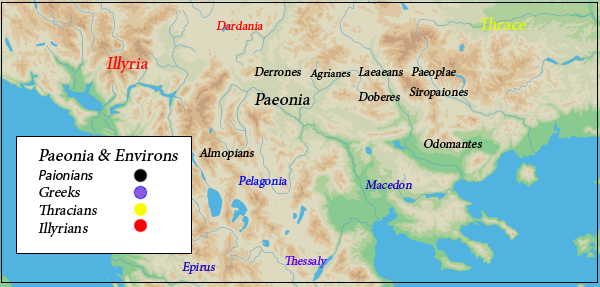
Paeonia, tribes, and environs

Ariston (Ancient Greek: Ἀρίστων) was a member of the Paionian royal house, possibly brother of King Patraus and father of the later king, Audoleon. He served as commander of the Paeonian cavalry in the army of Alexander the Great.

== Service in Alexander's army ==
His service with Alexander the Great, like that of the Thracian Sitalces II and others, helped to ensure the loyalty of his nation to Macedon during Alexander's absence in Asia. He was the commander of the unit of Paionian cavalry. Initially only one squadron strong, the Paionians received 500 reinforcements in Egypt and a further 600 at Susa.

At the Battle of Gaugamela, the Paionian cavalry were placed on the right flank with the sarissophoroi. In 331 BC, the Paionian cavalry routed a large force of Persian cavalry near the Tigris, Ariston personally slew the Persian leader Satropates; he then presented Alexander with the Persian's severed head. He asked Alexander for a gold cup as a reward for his feat, and the king publicly saluted him and drank to his health.

== See also ==
- Bylazora
- Paeonians
- Paeonian language

== Bibliography ==
- Ashley, J.R. (2004) The Macedonian Empire: The Era of Warfare Under Philip II and Alexander the Great, 359-323 B.C. McFarland.
- Heckel, W. (1992) The Marshalls of Alexander's Empire, Psychology Press
- Heckel, W. (2006) Who's Who in the Age of Alexander the Great: Prosopography of Alexander's Empire
