= Serraepolis =

Town of ancient Cilicia in Asia Minor

- Serretilis, Ser(r)opolis, Serrai kome, Siris and Kassipolis
- Location within Turkey
- 36°38′33.7″N 35°28′53.5″E
- Type: Settlement
- Location: Adana Province, Turkey

Serraepolis or Serraipolis (Ancient Greek: Σερραίπολις) was a town of ancient Cilicia in Asia Minor on the lower course of river Pyramos. It was also known under the names Serretillis (Σερρέτιλλις), Ser(r)opolis, Serrai kome and Siris, as well as Kassipolis by Pliny.

It was a colony established by Siropaiones, a Paeonian tribe that was annexed by Macedon whose metropolis was Siris (modern Serres), and after which it was named. It was located 150 stadia from another Macedonian colony called Aegeae (modern Yumurtalık) and 250 stadia from Antioch (modern Antakya). Although the exact foundation time of the city is unknown, it would be safe to assume that it was either established by Paeonian refugees, forcibly resettled by the Persian general Megabazus in 486 B.C., or established during the Hellenistic period by colonists from Siris that followed Alexander the Great and the Seleucids.

In place of the ancient Greek city today lies the modern city Sirintilinin Çiftlik in southeastern Turkey.
