= Laeaeans =

Ancient tribe in Southeast Europe

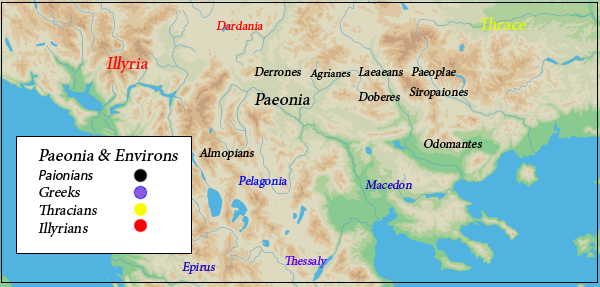
Paeonia tribes and environs

The Laeaeans (/liːˈiːənz/; Ancient Greek: Λαιαῖοι) were a Paeonian tribe who in the 4th century BC lived adjacent to the Agrianes, another Paeonian tribe, either along the upper course of the Strymon river at the western edge of ancient Thrace, or along the river Astibus in modern North Macedonia.

== History ==
According to Thucydides, the Laeaeans, along with the Agrianes, the Thracian Dii, and other tribes, joined Sitalkes in his unsuccessful campaign against Perdiccas II of Macedon. The coins issued by the Laeaeans are judged to be of crude workmanship, and seem to be imitations of finer minted coins issued by other neighboring Paeonian tribes such as the Derrones. A typical coin bears the inscription LAIAI (Laeaeans) on the obverse, and a Pegasus in a double linear square on the reverse. Laeaeans were not incorporated into the Odrysian or the Paeonian state, remaining an independent tribe outside the borders of those kingdoms.

It is unclear whether or not the Laeaeans were conquered by Philip II or Alexander the Great, although their neighbors are recorded by historians such as Arrian as client kings of Macedon.

== See also ==
- Thracians
