= Derrones =

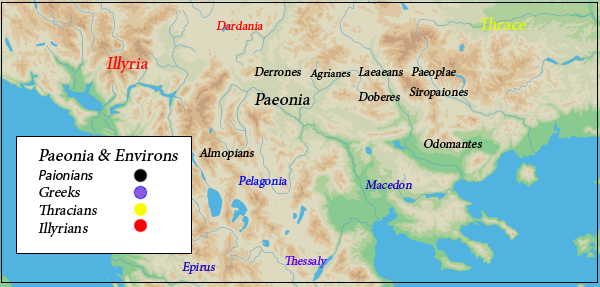
Approximate location of the Derrones

The Derrones or Derronians (or Deroni, Derroni) were a Paeonian or a Thracian tribe.

== History ==
Our knowledge of them comes from coins bearing variations of the legend of DERRONIKON (ΔΕΡΡΟΝΙΚΟΝ) - DERR (ΔΕΡΡ). The letters used in the coins are Greek, although this does not prove that the Derrones spoke the same language as their southern neighbours. These coins, which were perhaps made for export as much as for internal trade, are traditionally dated to 500–450 BC.

Based on numismatic evidence, and especially coin hoards, there are two theories regarding the geographic position of the tribe. The first theory claims that they should be placed in the central Balkans, in the northern part of modern North Macedonia (at the Upper Strymon valley), while the second theory considers that this tribe, at least at the time of the striking of the inscribed coins (i.e. early 5th century), was based in an area near Astibus further to the south.

== See also ==
- Paeonian language
