= Almopians =

Ancient Paeonian tribe

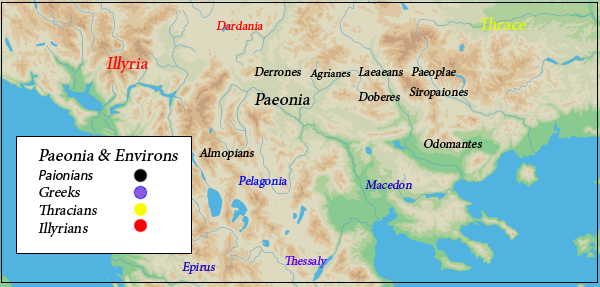
Paeonia, tribes and Environs

Almopians or Almopes (Ancient Greek: Ἀλμῶπες or Ἀλμωπεῖς) were an ancient Paeonian tribe.

== History ==
According to the Greek mythology, the founder of the tribe was thought to be the Giant demigod Almops whom they highly worshiped. Almopians originally inhabited the region of Almopia, which was named after the tribe, until they were expelled after the conquest of the region and its integration into Lower Macedonia by Alexander I of Macedon.

== See also ==
- Paeonia (kingdom)
