= Bastareus =

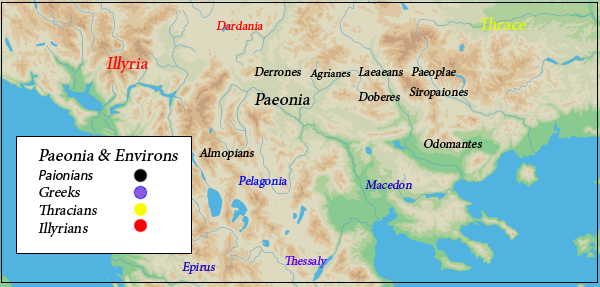
Paeonia; tribes and environs

Bastareus (Greek: Βασταρεύς; fl. 4th century BC) was an ancient king of Thrace, known only from a rare coin bearing his name. He was perhaps Paeonian.
