= Siropaiones =

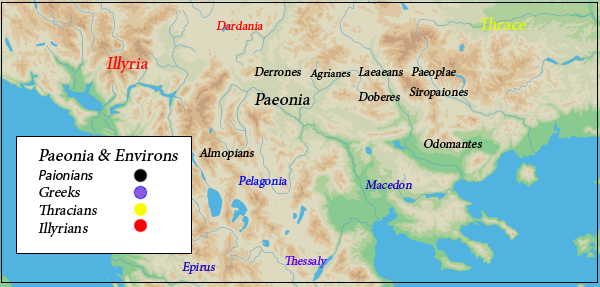
Paeonia, tribes and Environs

Siro-Paeonians or Siropaiones (Ancient Greek: Σιροπαίονες, Greek: Σιριοπαίονες, ή Σιρινοπαίονες) were an ancient Paeonian tribe inhabiting the ancient city of Siris, present-day Serres, and the Strymon plain. They were one of eight (Herodotus) or ten (Thucydides) tribes of Paeonia. They were situated from the Bisaltae and Odomanti to the south, Sinthi to the north, the Strymon to the east, Maedi to the west, and a mountain chain separating them from Crestonia. Their capital was Siris. They were defeated by the Persian general Megabazus (486 BC). They were expelled by the Persians to Asia Minor, where they are assumed to have founded Serraepolis.

== Legacy ==
The toponym Circipania has been connected to the tribal name.

== See also ==
- Peltast

== Sources ==
- Nicholas Geoffrey Lemprière Hammond; Guy Thompson Griffith; Frank William Walbank (1972). A History of Macedonia: Historical geography and prehistory. Clarendon Press.
- Arnold Joseph Toynbee (1969). Some problems of Greek history. Oxford University Press.
- The Histories (Penguin Classics) by Herodotus, John M. Marincola, and Aubery de Selincourt, ISBN 0-14-044908-6, 2003, page 315: "... was that a number of Paeonian tribes - the Siriopaeones, Paeoplae, ..."
