= Agis of Paeonia =

4th-century BCE founder and king of the Paeonian kingdom

Agis

King of Paeonia
- Reign: early 4th century BC
- Successor: Lyppeius
- Born: ?
- Died: c. 359/358 BC

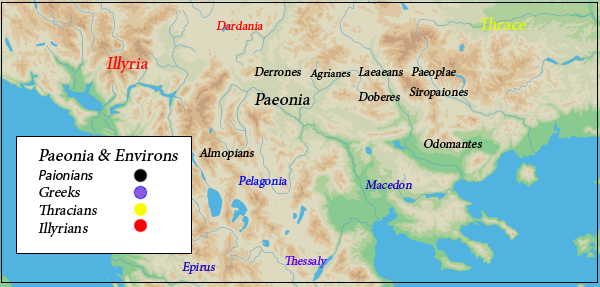
Paeonia, tribes and Environs

Agis (Greek: Ἄγις; died 359/358 BC) was king of the Paeonia in the early 4th century BC, until his death in 359/358 BC.

== History ==
Agis ruled as king of Paeonia. He was also a pretender to the Macedonian throne in a time of instability after the death of Perdiccas III of Macedon. In 360–359 BC, Paeonians led by Agis were launching raids into Macedon (Diodorus XVI. 2.5) in support of an Illyrian invasion. He was a contemporary of Philip II of Macedon. After his death in 359/358 BC, he was succeeded by Lyppeius, who became subject to Philip II in 356 BC.

== See also ==
- Rise of Macedon
- Paeonian language
