= Pigres of Paionia =

Pigres of Paionia, with his brother Mantyas and his sister, came to Sardes, where the Persian king Darius I was at the time.

== History ==
He hoped that by the favour of Darius he and his brother might be established as tyrants over the Paeonians. However, Darius was so pleased with the exhibition of industry and dexterity that he saw in their sister that he sent orders to his general Megabazus to transport Paeonians into Asia.
