= Paeonia (kingdom) =

Ancient region and kingdom in the Balkans

- Bronze Age–217 BC
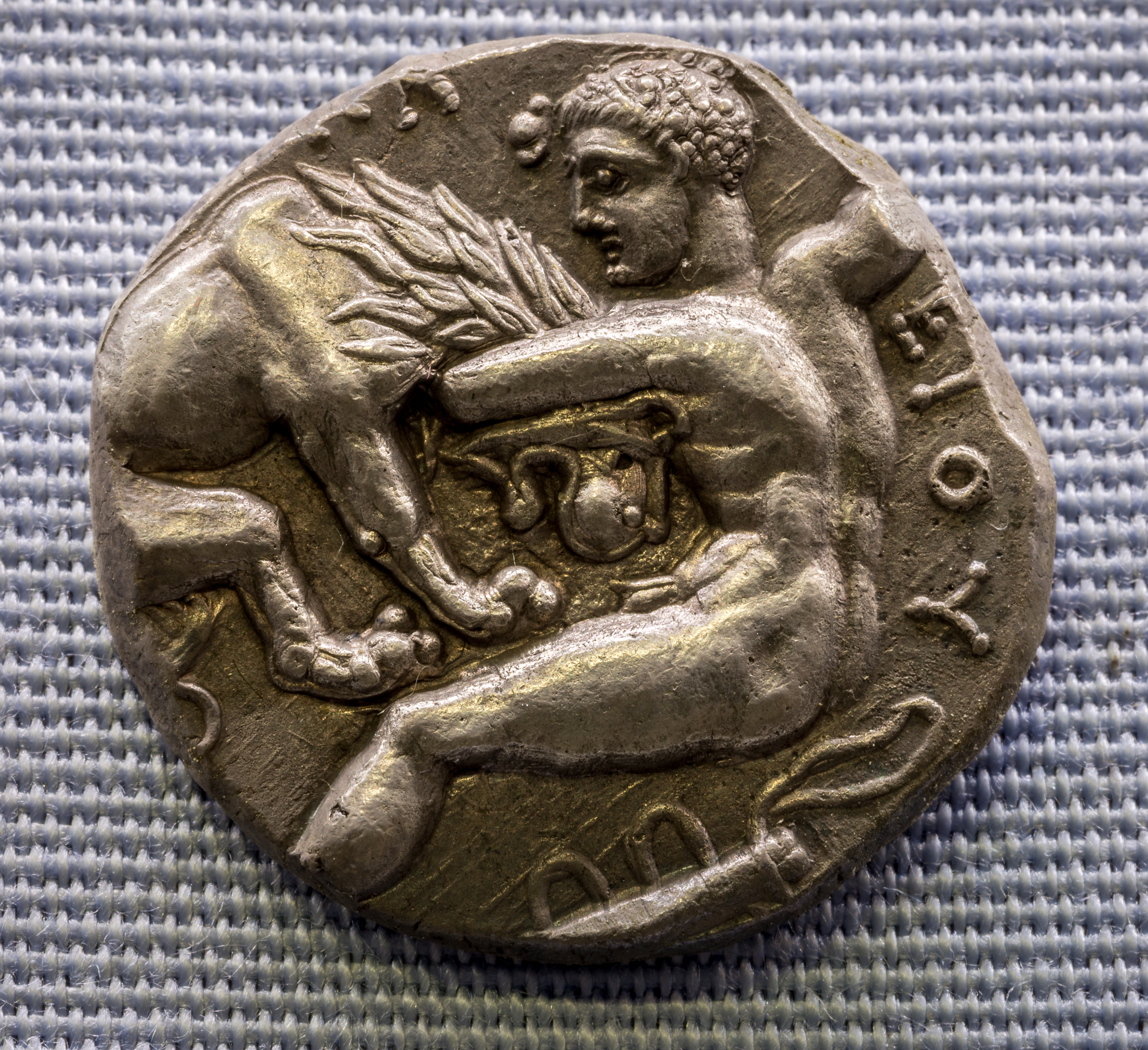
- Coin of Lyppeius, King of Paeonia (359–335 BC), depicting Herakles and the Nemean lion

- Paeonian tribes and Paeonia
- Capital: Bylazora; Stobi; Amydon (age of Trojan War)
- Common languages: Paeonian
- Demonym: Paeonian
- Government: Monarchy
- Historical era: Classical antiquity
  - Foundation by Paeon: Bronze Age
  - death of Agis of Paeonia: 359/358 BC
  - Lyppeius becomes subject to Philip II: 356 BC
  - Audoleon's reign: 315-285 BC
  - Leon reestablishes Paeonia after the Celtic invasion: c. 278 BC
  - Dardanians capture Bylazora: c. 230 BC
  - Philip V of Macedon captures Bylazora: 217 BC
Succeeded by
Skudra (Achaemenid Empire)
Kingdom of Macedon
Kingdom of Dardania
- Today part of: North Macedonia; Greece; Bulgaria

Paeonia or Paionia (Ancient Greek: Παιονία, romanized: Paionía, Latinized: Paeonia), was the land and the kingdom of the Paeonians in classical antiquity. Paeonia roughly corresponded to present-day North Macedonia. It also included parts of northern Greece and western Bulgaria.

In the Iliad, the Paeonians are portrayed as allies of the Trojans. Ancient authors placed Paeonia south of Dardania, northeast of Pelagonia, north of Lower Macedonia, west of the Thracian mountains, and east of the southernmost Illyrians of the Ohrid–Prespa basin. Pelagonia was used as a name for the westernmost part of Paeonia, while the north-westernmost part of Pelagonia was referred to as Derriopos. Paeonia was separated from Dardania by the mountains through which the Vardar river passes from the field of Scupi (modern Skopje) to the valley of Bylazora (near modern Sveti Nikole), which was the Paeonian capital. In 356 BC, the Paeonian king Lyppeius became a subject to Philip II. Starting from Agis in the 4th century BC down to 227 BC, at least seven Paeonian kings reigned Paeonia as a distinct entity, either subject to Macedon or independent.

== Mythology ==
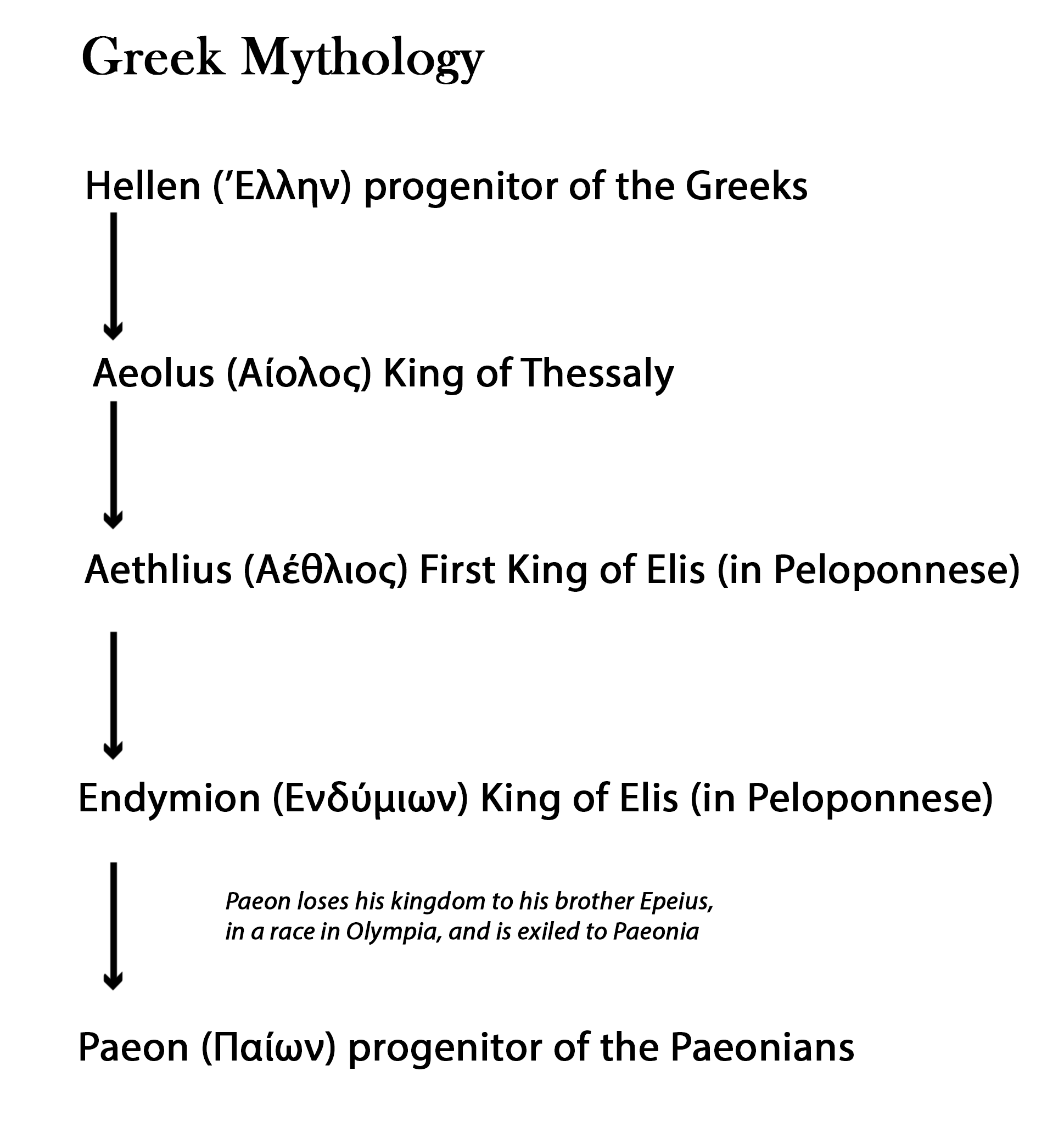
Paeon's myth

In Greek mythology, the Paeonians were said to have derived their name from Paeon, son of Endymion. Endymion of Elis, the lover of the goddess of the Moon (Selene), had three sons: Paeon, Epeios, and Aetolus; the eponymous ancestors of the Paeonians, Epeians, and Aetolians, respectively. Endymion, in order to give his kingdom to one of them, made them run a race in Olympia, where Epeios won and took the kingdom. Paeon left in disappointment to settle in the Upper Valley of Axios which was since called Paeonia.

Appian wrote of a genealogy in which Paeon, the eponym of the Paeonians, is the son of Autarieus, the eponym of the Autariatae, and father of Skordiskos and Triballos, the eponyms of two central Balkanic tribes, one Celtic and the other Thracian. This might connect the Paeonians with the Illyrian complex, although as Katičić suggests, Appian might not refer to the Paeonians but might refer instead to the Pannonians, since Appian uses the Paeonian name to denote that ethnic group as well.

There is relatively little mention of the Paeonians in the works of the ancient Greeks. In the Trojan War, the Paeonians "with ankylosed bows" and "wearing helmets with horsetails" were allies of the Trojans, fighting on their side under their king Pyraechmes and Asteropaios, son of Pelagon. Thus, Homer speaks of Paeonians from the Axios with their capital at Amydon, fighting on the side of the Trojans, but the Iliad does not mention whether the Paeonians were kin to the Trojans, and instead connects them to the Phrygians.

Several eastern Paeonian tribes, including the Agrianes, clearly fell within the Thracian sphere of influence, but Herodotus and Thucydides distinguish the Paeonians from the Thracians. According to their national legend, they were Teucrian colonists from Troy. Polybius mentions that Emathia was earlier called Paeonia, and Strabo, that it extended to Pieria and Pelagonia; these references are related to the Bronze Age period before the Trojan War according to N. G. L. Hammond.

== History ==
=== Paeonian tribes ===
Paeonian tribes and the Kingdom of Macedon to the south

Before the reign of Darius the Great, Paeonians had made their way as far east as Perinthus in Thrace on the Propontis. At one time all Mygdonia, together with Crestonia, was subject to them. When Xerxes crossed Chalcidice on his way to Therma (near later Thessalonica), he is said to have marched through Paeonian territory. They occupied the entire valley of the Axios (Vardar) as far inland as Stobi, the valleys to the east of it as far as the Strymon and the country round Astibus and the river of the same name, with the water of which they anointed their kings. As a consequence of the growth of the Macedonian power, and under pressure from their Thracian neighbors, their territory was considerably diminished, and in historical times was limited to the north of Macedon, from Illyria to the Strymon.

The Paeonian tribes included:

- Agrianes (it is also claimed that the tribe was Thracian)
- Odomantes (it is also claimed that the tribe was Thracian)
- Derrones (it is also claimed that the tribe was Thracian)
- Laeaeans
- Paeoplae
- Doberes
- Siropaiones
- Almopians

=== War with the Achaemenid Empire ===
The subjugation of the Paeonians happened as a part of Persian military operations initiated by Darius the Great (521–486) in 513 after—immense preparations—a huge Achaemenid army invaded the Balkans and tried to defeat the European Scythians roaming to the north of the Danube River. Darius' army subjugated several Thracian peoples, and virtually all other regions that touch the European part of the Black Sea, such as parts of nowadays Bulgaria, Romania, Ukraine, and Russia, before it returned to Asia Minor. Darius left in Europe one of his commanders named Megabazus whose task was to accomplish conquests in the Balkans. The Persian troops subjugated gold-rich Thrace, the coastal Greek cities, as well as defeating and conquering the powerful Paeonians.

Pigres of Paionia, hoped that by the favour of Darius, he and his brother might be established as tyrants over the Paeonians. Darius, however, sent orders to Megabazus to transport Paeonians into Asia. The conquered Paeonians from as far as Lake Prasias, including the Paeoplae and Siropaiones, were deported from Paeonia to Asia. At the time of the Persian invasion, the Paeonians on the lower Strymon had lost, while those in the north maintained, their territorial integrity.

=== Paeonian kingdom ===
The Paeonians next to the Odrysian Kingdom, Macedon and the Delian League

At some point after the Greco-Persian Wars, the Paeonian princedoms coalesced into a kingdom centred in the central and upper reaches of the Axios and Strymon rivers, corresponding with today's central and eastern parts of North Macedonia and western Bulgaria. In early times, the chief town and seat of the Paeonian kings was Bylazora (in modern Sveti Nikole municipality in North Macedonia) on the Vardar; later, the seat of the kings was moved to Stobi (near modern Gradsko).

==== War with Macedon ====
Paeonians joined with the Illyrians to attack the northern areas of the kingdom of Macedonia. The Illyrians, who had a culture of piracy, would have been cut off from some trade routes if movement through this land had been blocked. They unsuccessfully attacked the northern defences of Macedonian territory in an attempt to occupy the region. In 360–359 BC, southern Paeonian tribes—then ruled by Agis—were launching raids into Macedon (Diodorus XVI. 2.5) in support of an Illyrian invasion.

The Macedonian royal house was thrown into a state of uncertainty by the death of Perdiccas III, but his brother Philip II assumed the throne, reformed the army (providing phalanxes), and proceeded to stop both the Illyrian invasion and the Paeonian raids after the death of Agis. Shortly after Philip's chaotic accession in 359/8, following the death in battle of his brother Perdiccas III, he was forced to bribe the Paeonians to abandon their invasion of Macedonia. The payment, judged as small by modern historians, may have been made with promises of future tribute from Macedonia, but this never materialized.

Philip followed Perdiccas's succession in 358 BC with a campaign deep into the north, into Paeonia itself. Philip reformed the army and invaded Paeonia after learning about the death of Agis, perhaps in the spring of 358 BC. The details of the subsequent battle are unknown, but apparently the Paeonians, now led by Lyppeius, met Philip's 10,000 strong force in a pitched battle and were defeated. According to Diodorus, they were then forced to swear allegiance to the Macedonians.

In late 357, in an attempt to curb Philip's relentless expansion, Athens entered into an anti-Macedonian coalition with King Grabus II of Illyria, the Thracian kings, Olynthus, and Lyppeius of Paeonia. These efforts proved fruitless, however, as Philip neutralized each of Athens' allies one-by-one. In 356 BC, Paeonia became subject to Philip.

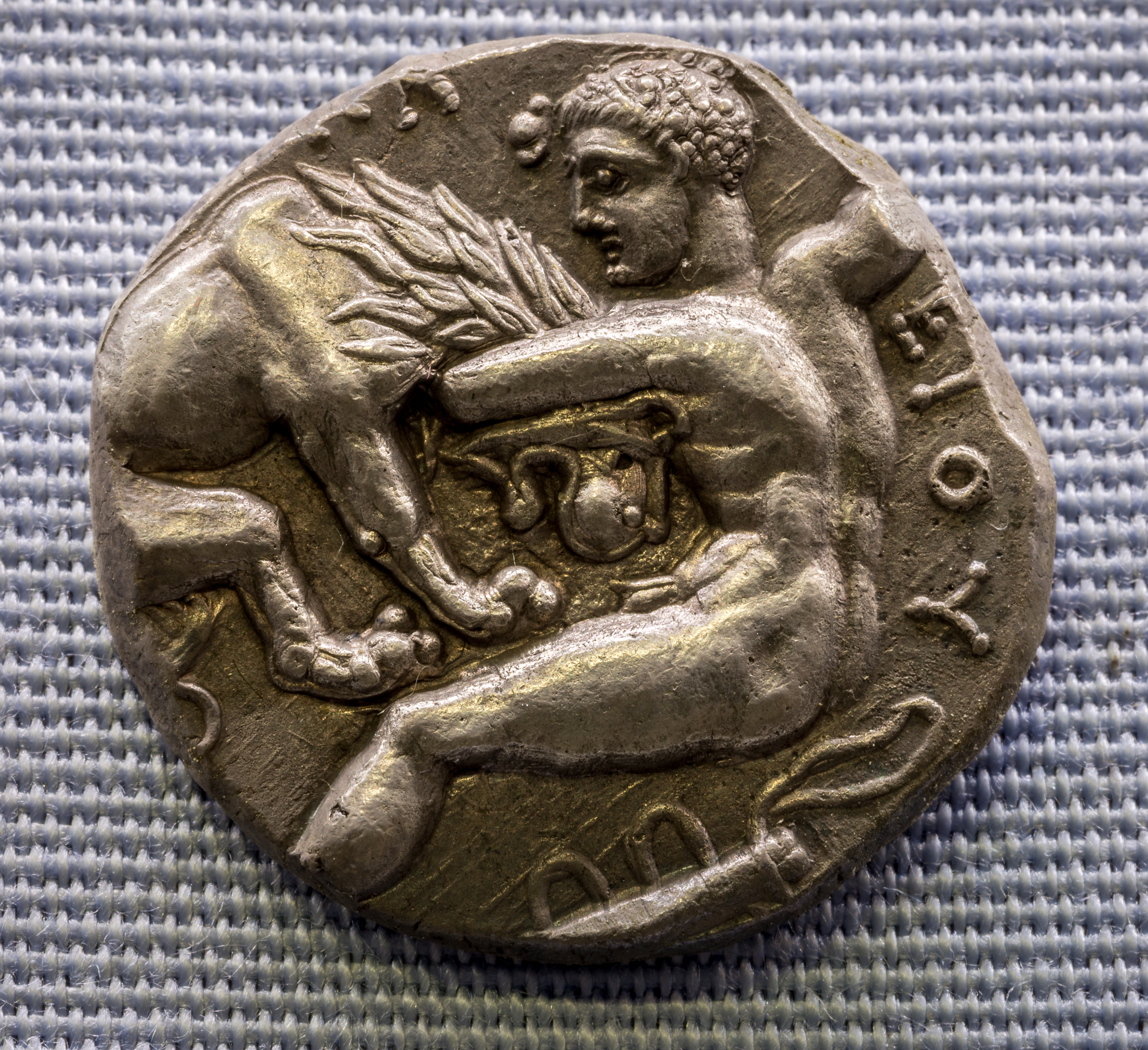
Coin of Lykkeios (Lycceius), King of Paeonia (359–335 BC), depicting Herakles and the Nemean lion

=== Paeonian kings become subjects to Philip II and Alexander ===
This reduced the Paeonian Kingdom then ruled by Lyppeius to a semi-autonomous, subordinate status, which led to a process of gradual and formal Hellenization of the Paeonians, who, during the reign of Philip II, began to issue coins with Greek legends like the Macedonian ones. Lyppeius was consequently reduced to a vassal status for the remainder of his reign, but he evidently retained a degree of independence as he continued to mint coins in his own name. He was succeeded by Patraus. Although Paeonians retained their territory and the right to mint coins, they were expected to provide both tribute and manpower for Macedonian military campaigns.

==== Paeonian cavalry ====
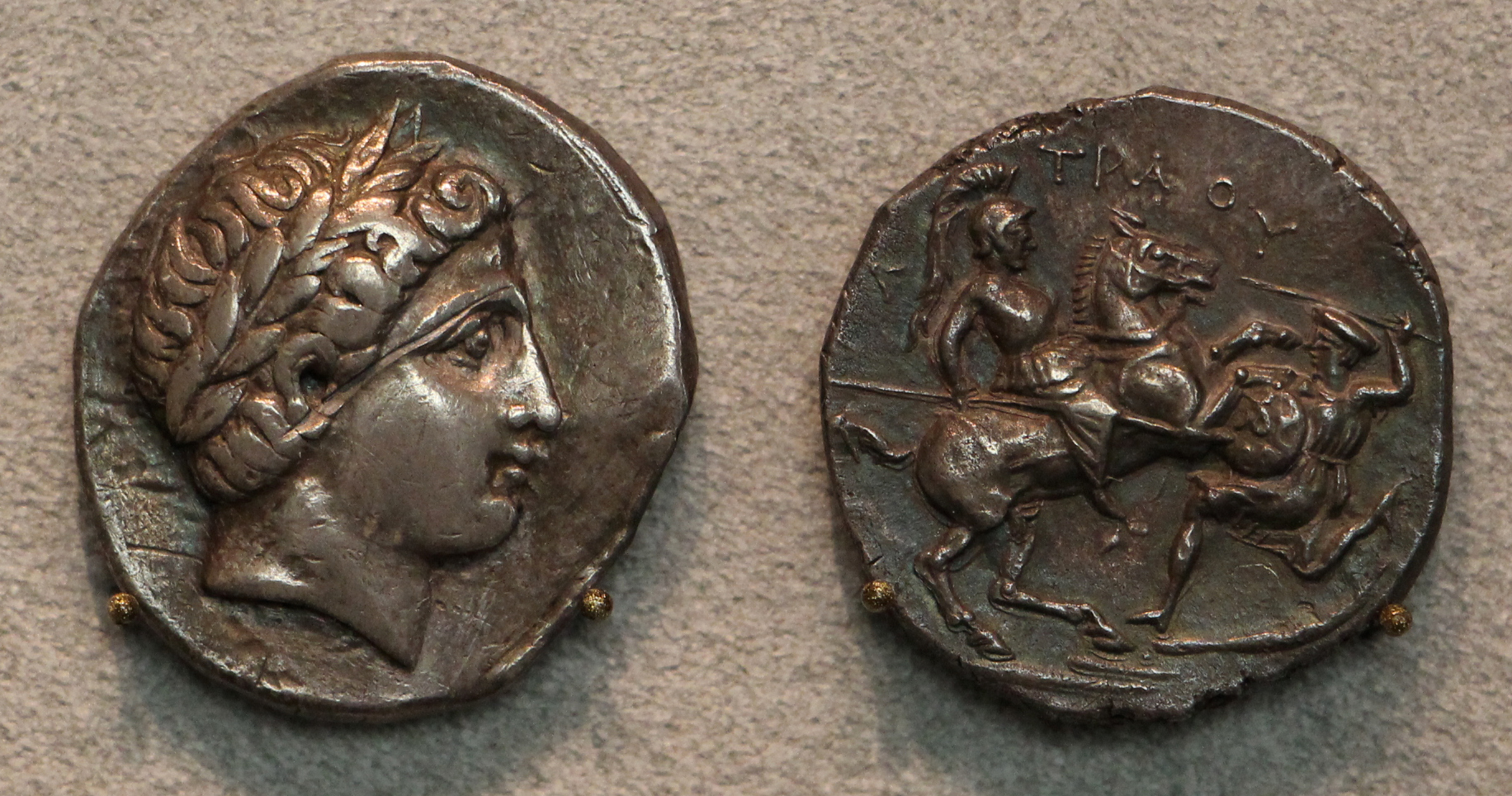
Coin of Patraus, king of Paeonia (335–315 BC)

A Paeonian cavalry contingent, led by Ariston, possibly brother of King Patraus and father of the later king Audoleon, was attached to Alexander the Great's army. His service with Alexander the Great, like that of the Thracian Sitalces II and others, helped to ensure the loyalty of his nation to Macedon in Alexander's absence during the campaign against Persia. Ariston's command consisted initially of only one squadron of 150 cavalrymen. He crossed with Alexander's army into Asia Minor in 334. The Paeonians received 500 reinforcements in Egypt and a further 600 at Susa.

At the Battle of Gaugamela, the Paeonian cavalry was placed on the right flank with the sarissophoroi. In 331 BC, the Paeonian cavalry routed a large force of Persian cavalry near the Tigris, and Ariston personally slew the Persian leader Satropates; he then presented Alexander with the Persian's severed head. He asked Alexander for a gold cup as a reward for his feat, and the king publicly saluted him and drank to his health.

==== Agrianian peltasts ====
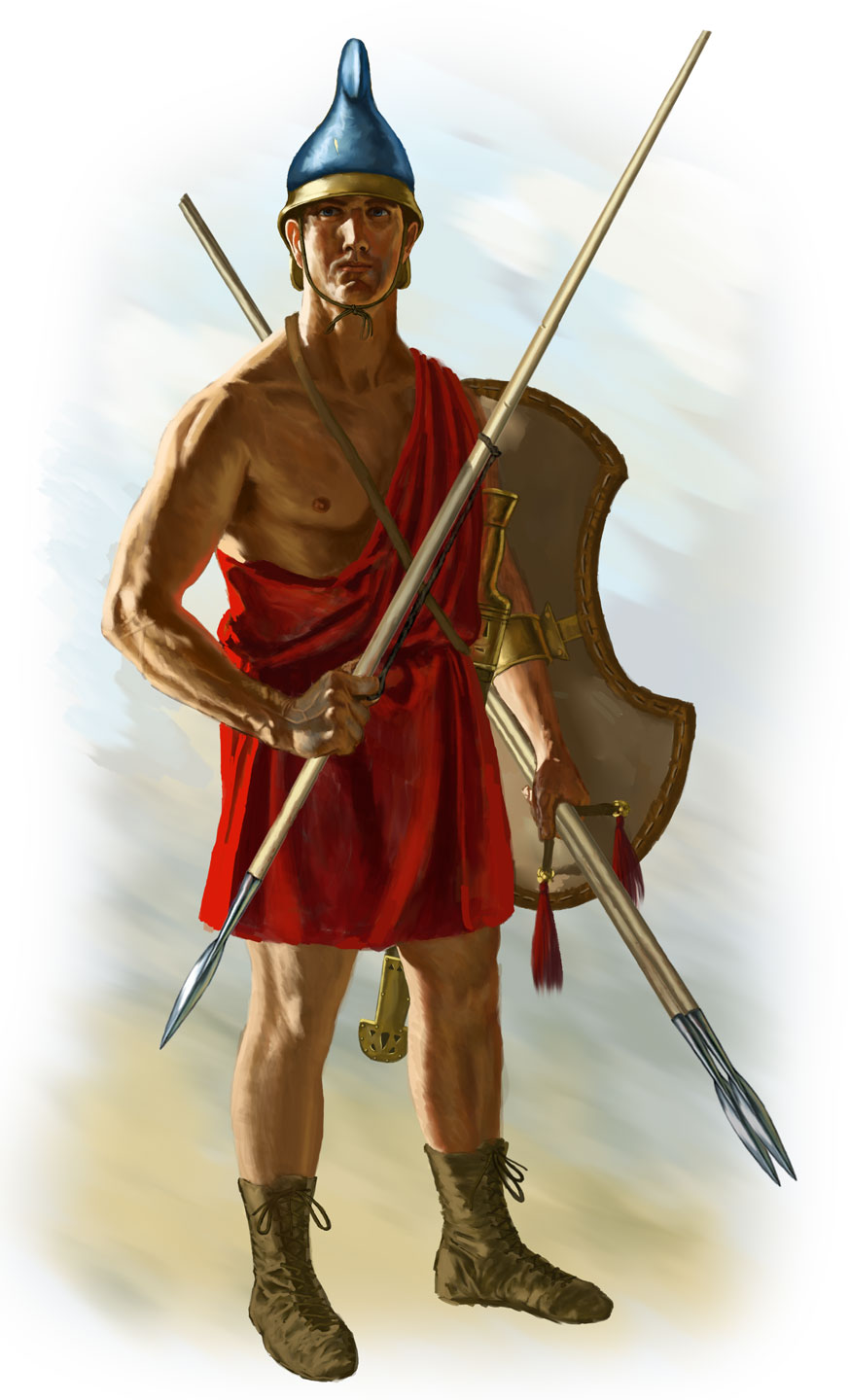
Agrianian peltast

Alexander the Great wished to bestow the hand of his sister Cynane upon Langarus, king of the Agrianians, who had shown himself loyal to Philip II. The Agrianes were armed with javelins and were the elite unit of Alexander the Great's army's light infantry. They fought under king Langarus against the Triballians in 335 BC, and succeeded in protecting the lands of Alexander and were thus rewarded with the right to govern themselves, a move that led to a long-lasting and most reliable alliance. At the Battle of Gaugamela, the contingent of Agrianian peltasts numbered 1,000 men.

=== Hellenistic age ===
When the Diadochi began to style themselves as kings, Audoleon also declared himself king of Paeonia to emphasize his kingdom's independence. The daughter of Audoleon became wife of Pyrrhus, king of Epirus. An inscription records that Audoleon was honored by the Athenians with not only citizenship for himself and his descendants, but also a golden wreath and a bronze equestrian statue in the Agora for his help against the Antigonids. This is the last mention of Audoleon before his death in 285 or 284 BC. In 285/4 BC, Lysimachus took control of Paeonia, and Ariston, the son of Audoleon, escaped to Dardania.

==== Gallic invasion ====
In 280-279 BC, when the Gauls defeated Ptolemy Ceraunus and got as far as Delphi, it is certain that Paeonia was overrun and held for a time by their chieftain Brennus. In the wake of the Celtic invasion, Leon reestablished the Paeonian kingdom.

==== Decline ====
Antigonus Gonatas annexed Paeonia into his kingdom. Irwin Merker suggests that when Macedon under Demetrios II and the Aetolian League were at war, the king of Paeonia Dropion, "was involved as an ally of Aitolia." Additionally he states that Dropion imitated the Macedonian Koinon in order to modernize the constitution of his Paeonian kingdom.

After the Celtic invasion of the Balkans weakened the Paeonians, the political and military role of the Dardanians began to grow in the region. They expanded their state to the area of Paeonia which definitively disappeared from history. In 230 BC, the Dardani under Longarus captured Bylazora. In 227 BC, Antigonus Doson conquered the southern part of Paeonia, also called 'Macedonian Paeonia', and founded the city of Antigoneia. In 217 BC, Philip V of Macedon incorporated into his empire Dassaretia and Paeonia by capturing Bylazora and the rest. Perseis and Astraion were founded, while the citizens of Paeonian cities under Antigonid rule remained Paeonians.

=== Paeonia as part of the Roman province of Macedonia ===
In 168 BC, Roman legions conquered Antigonid Macedonia, and a larger Roman province bearing the name of Macedonia was formed. Paeonia around the Axios formed part of the second and third districts respectively of the newly constituted Roman province of Macedonia. Thus, after the Roman conquest, Paeonia was part of the province of Macedonia. Centuries later under Diocletian, Paeonia and Pelagonia formed a province called Macedonia Secunda or Macedonia Salutaris, belonging to the Praetorian prefecture of Illyricum of the Roman empire.

Pausanias tells us of a genealogy, which connects the Paeonians with the Peloponnesian Epeians and the Aetolians; Paion is said to be the son of Endymion and brother of Epeius and Aitolus. This version establishes a Greek affiliation for the Paeonians, while Anson writes that "this notice from Pausanias may suggest that at least by the second century AD the Paeonians were seen as part of the Greek community".

== Culture ==
The Paeonians included several independent tribes, some of which later united under the rule of a single king. Little is known of their manners and customs. They adopted the cult of Dionysus, known amongst them as Dyalus or Dryalus, and Herodotus mentions that the Thracian and Paeonian women offered sacrifice to Queen Artemis (probably Bendis). They worshipped the Sun in the form of a small round disk fixed on the top of a pole. They drank barley beer and various decoctions made from plants and herbs. The country was rich in gold and a bituminous kind of wood (or stone, which burst into a blaze when in contact with water) called tanrivoc (or tsarivos). The women were famous for their industry. In this connection Herodotus tells the story that Darius, having seen at Sardis a beautiful Paeonian woman carrying a pitcher on her head, leading a horse to drink, and spinning flax, all at the same time, inquired who she was. Having been informed that she was a Paeonian, he sent instructions to Megabazus, commander in Thrace, to deport two tribes of the nation without delay to Asia.

An inscription, discovered in 1877 at Olympia on the base of a statue, states that it was set up by the community of the Paeonians in honor of their king and founder Dropion. Another king, whose name appears as Lyppeius on a fragment of an inscription found at Athens relating to a treaty of alliance, is no doubt identical with the Lycceius or Lycpeius of Paeonian coins.

=== Paeonian language ===
Some modern scholars consider the Paeonians to have been of either Illyrian, Brygian/Phrygian, Thracian, or of mixed origins. Linguistically, the very small number of surviving words in the Paeonian language have been variously connected to its neighboring languages Illyrian and Thracian (and every possible Thraco-Illyrian mix in–between), Phrygian, as well as to Greek but with a great deal of Illyrian and Thracian influence as a result of their proximity. According to Radoslav Katičić, the possibility that the Paeonians took part in the "great Greek migration" and remained behind on the route cannot be wholly ruled out. Irwin L. Merker considers the Paeonians to be of Hellenic stock.

A passage in Athenaeus seems to indicate the affinity of their language with Mysian. The scanty remains of the Paeonian language do not allow a firm judgement to be made. On one side are Wilhelm Tomaschek and Paul Kretschmer, who claim it belonged to the Illyrian family, and on the other side is Dimitar Dečev, who claims affinities with Thracian. On the other hand, the Paeonian kings issued coins from the time of Philip II of Macedon onwards, bearing their names written in straightforward Greek. All the names of the Paeonian kings that have come down to us are, in fact, explainable with and clearly related to Greek (Agis, Ariston, Audoleon, Lycceius, etc.), a fact that, according to Irwin L. Merker, puts into question the theories of Illyrian and Thracian connections. Merker considers the Paeonian language closely related to Greek (i.e., Hellenic) or an ancient Greek dialect as he writes: "on the basis of the Paionian names, we can say that there is no evidence that the Paionians did not speak a dialect of Greek". Vladimir I. Georgiev suggested a Phrygian affiliation.

== Kings of Paeonia ==
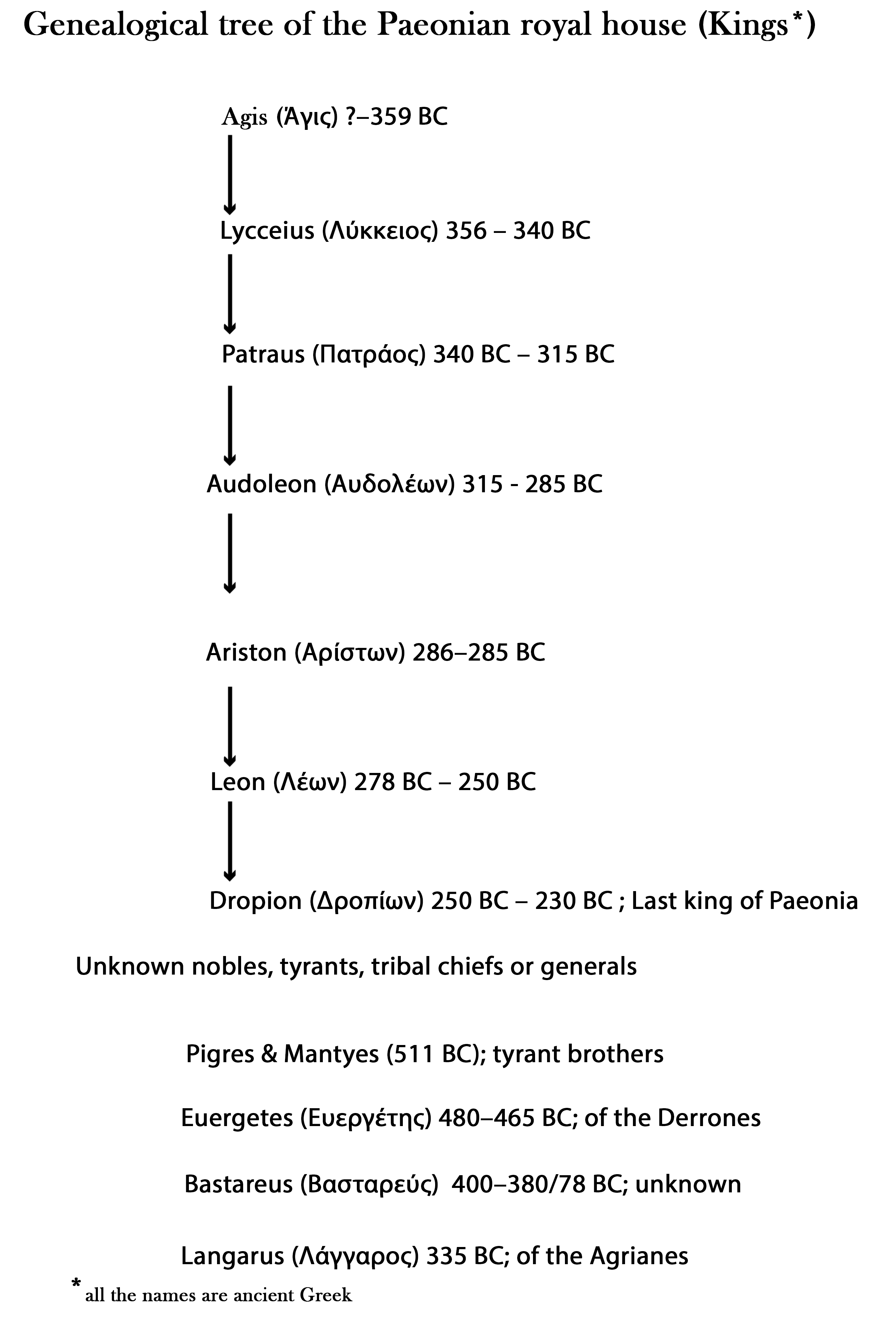
Kings of Paeonia

=== Mainline ===
- Agis (died 359/8 BC): He was the first known king of the Paeonian kingdom and a pretender to the Macedonian throne in a time of instability.
- Lycceius (359/8–335 BC): He joined a coalition with Athens, Grabos II and Thrace in 356 BC against Philip II of Macedon. He lost and became subject to Philip II.
- Patraus (335–315 BC): He ruled as a subject to Alexander the Great.
- Audoleon (315–285 BC): He was son of Patraus and became an independent king of Paeonia.
- Ariston (286–285 BC): He was son of Audoleon. He escaped to Dardania while Lysimachus took control of his kingdom.
- Leon (278–250 BC): He consolidated and restored lost lands after the Gallic invasions in 280/279 BC.
- Dropion (250–230 BC): He was son of Leon and last known Paeonian king of a dwindling kingdom.

=== Others ===
- Pigres and Mantyes: two tyrant brothers who in 511 BC asked Darius I to help them take control of Paeonia. Instead of that, Darius commanded for the coastal Paeonians to be deported to Asia.
- Dokidan: of the Derrones; reigned during the 6th century BC.
- Dokim: of the Derrones; reigned during the 6th century BC.
- Euergetes: of the Derrones; reigned c. 480–465 BC, known only from his coinage.
- Teutaos: reigned from c. 450–435 BC; known only from his coinage.
- Bastareus: reigned from c. 400–380/78 BC, known only from his coinage.
- Teutamado: reigned from 378 to 359 BC, known only from his coinage.
- Symnon: great ally of Phillip II from 348 to 336 BC.
- Nicharchos: reigned from 335 to 323 BC; son of Symon.
- Langarus: king of the Agrianes; invaded the territory of the Autariatae in 335 BC in coalition with Alexander the Great.
- Dyplaios: king of the Agrianes; reigned around 330 BC.
- Didas: allied with Philip V of Macedon (with 4,000 warriors) from 215 to 197 BC.

=== Foreign rulers ===
==== Persian ====
- Darius I: subjugated Paeonia in 511/2 BC.
- Xerxes: included Paeonians in the vast Persian army for the Invasion of Greece in 480 BC.

==== Thracian ====
- Sitalces: included Agrianes and Laeaeans in his Macedonian campaign in 429 BC.

==== Macedonian ====
- Philip II of Macedon: subjugated Paeonia in 356 BC.
- Alexander the Great: Paeonia remained a Macedonian vassal kingdom during the reign of Patraus.
- Lysimachus: removed Ariston, son of Audoleon, and took possession of Paeonia in 285/4 BC.
- Antigonus Gonatas: annexed Paeonia.
- Antigonus Doson: conquered southern Paeonia in 227 BC.
- Philip V of Macedon: conquered Bylazora in 217 BC.

==== Celtic ====
- Brennus (3rd century BC): conquered Paeonia before 279 BC.
- Acichorius

==== Dardanian ====
- Longarus: conquered Bylazora in 230 BC.

== Towns of Paeonia ==
- Bylazora
- Stobi
- Astibus
- Amydon
- Antigonia
- Perseis
- Astraion
- Styberra
- Bryanium
- Doberus
- Scupi

== See also ==
- List of ancient Illyrian peoples and tribes
- List of ancient tribes in Thrace
- List of kings of Thrace and Dacia
- History of North Macedonia
- Macedonia (region)
- Central Macedonia

== Bibliography ==
- Hatzopoulos, Miltiades B. (2020). Ancient Macedonia. De Gruyter. ISBN 978-3-11-071876-8.
- Reames, Jeanne (2008). Howe, Timothy (ed.). Macedonian Legacies: Studies in Ancient Macedonian History and Culture in Honor of Eugene N. Borza. Regina Books. ISBN 978-1-930-05356-4.
- Katičić, Radoslav (2012) [1976]. Winter, Werner (ed.). Ancient Languages of the Balkans (Part 1). Trends in Linguistics: State-of-the-art Reports. Vol. 4. De Gruyter Mouton. ISBN 978-3-11-156887-4.
- Pausanias. Description of Greece. Loeb Classical Library. Vol. 1. Translated by William Henry Samuel Jones. ISBN 0-674-99104-4.
- Stipčević, Aleksandar (1989). Iliri: povijest, život, kultura [The Illyrians: history and culture] (in Croatian). Školska knjiga. ISBN 978-86-03-99106-2.
