= Leon of Paionia =

Leon

King of Paeonia
- Reign: 278–250 BC
- Predecessor: Ariston (son of Audoleon)
- Successor: Dropion
- Died: 250 BC
- Religion: Ancient Greek religion

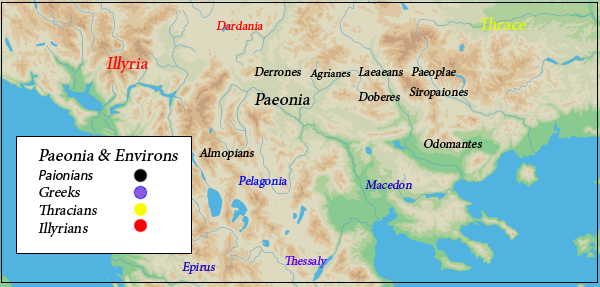
Paeonian tribes and environs

Leon of Paionia (Greek: Λέων) (278 BC – 250 BC) was an ancient Paeonian king during the 3rd century BC, who reestablished the kingdom of Paionia after the Celtic invasion.

== Reestablishment of Paeonia ==
He was son of Audoleon, who was the first independent king of Paionia after the death of Alexander the Great. In 279 BC, when the Gauls defeated Ptolemy Ceraunus of Macedon and got as far as Delphi, it is certain that Paeonia was overrun and held for a time by their chieftain Brennus. However, in the wake of the Celtic invasion, the Paeonian kingdom was reestablished by Leon. He was the father of Dropion, the last Paeonian king.

== See also ==
- Antigonus Gonatas
