= Patraus =

King of Paeonia, c. 335 – 315 BC

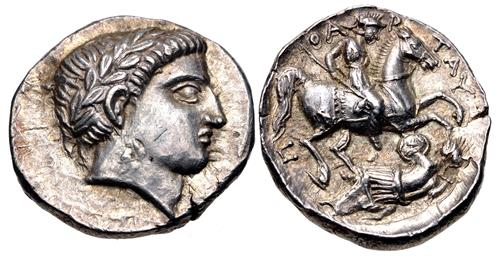
- Silver tetradrachm struck sometime during Patraus' reign. Obv.: laureate head of Apollo facing right; rev.: horseman spearing enemy warrior

King of Paeonia
- Reign: c. 335–315 BC
- Predecessor: Lyppeius
- Successor: Audoleon
- Born: ?
- Died: 315 BC
- Spouse: unknown
- Issue: Audoleon
- Religion: Ancient Greek religion

Patraus (Ancient Greek: Πατράος, romanized: Patráos) was king of the ancient kingdom of Paeonia from around 335 until his death in 315 BC.

== Early life ==
Patraus' relationship with the previous Paeonian king, Lyppeius, is unknown, as are the circumstances surrounding his ascension. Aside from the silver coinage struck in his name, we know nothing for certain about the events of Patraus' reign.

Paeonia was made a Macedonian vassal in 356 during the course of Philip II of Macedon's Balkan campaigns.

== Vassal of Alexander the Great ==
Although Paeonians retained their territory and the right to mint coins, they were expected to provide both tribute and manpower for Macedonian military campaigns. Consequently, around 150 cavalrymen, commanded by Ariston, crossed with Alexander the Great's army into Asia Minor in 334. Initially only one squadron strong, the Paeonians received 500 reinforcements in Egypt and a further 600 at Susa. Ariston may have been a member of the Paeonian ruling house, possibly Patraus' brother, but this is only speculation. Patraus died sometime in 315 and was succeeded by Audoleon.
