= Antigonia (Paeonia) =

Coordinates: 41°30′12″N 22°06′01″E

Antigonia (Ancient Greek: Ἀντιγόνεια) also transliterated as Antigonea and Antigoneia was a Hellenistic city in Paeonia, modern North Macedonia, placed in the Peutinger Table between Stenae (now named Prosek, near modern Demir Kapija) and Stobi. It is tentatively located near modern Negotino.

== Classical sources ==
Our written sources about Antigonia of Paeonia are quite obscure. In a description of Paeonia, Pliny the Elder (23-79 AD) lists a number of tribes, regions and towns. He tells us that Stobi is a town with many Roman citizens, followed by the phrase "next comes Antigonea, Europus, upon the river Axius" and so on. Thus, we know that Antigonia is located somewhere near Stobi and that Antigonia is not placed on the bank of the river Axius like Aeropus as said by Pliny. In 272 BC Antigonus II Gonatas gained full control of Macedonia and we know that he founded at least three cities with this name; an Antigonia on the mainland of Chalkidike near Cassandreia (Antigonia Psaphara), another in Atintania, Epirus, as a useful barrier against the Illyrians (Chaonian Antigonia) and a third one as we assume in Paeonia, with the aim of controlling the conquered province. Antigonus Doson founded the city in 227 BC. Livy (59 BC - 17 AD) who described the events of the Third Macedonian War gives details of the formation of the Macedonian troops before the Battle of Pydna (168 BC). He writes that on the right wing were the Macedonian cavalry and Cretan light infantry; Midon of Beroea was in charge of the latter force, Menon of Antigonia commanded the cavalry and the formation as a whole. Next to the wings were posted the royal cavalry and mixed units of the picked auxiliaries of many nations; Petrocles of Antigonia and Didas, the governor of Paeonia were in command of these. From this description of the forces we are informed that lower Paeonia (Macedonian Paeonia) was commanded by a Macedonian governor and that Paeonia played a central role for providing troops and cavalry to the Antigonid Macedonian army. After the defeat of the battle at Pydna, the kingdom of Macedon was severely punished and reduced to a Roman Province. Antigonia as one of the main suppliers of cavalry to the Macedonian army was by no means spared. However, in spite of that, we know that Antigonia continued to exist as a city since Ptolemy (90 -168 AD) listed it in his work Geographiae.
