= Perseis (Paeonia) =

City in ancient Macedon

Perseis (Ancient Greek: Περσηΐς) was a city of ancient Paeonia founded by Philip V of Macedon and named after Perseus. The city's exact location has not been confirmed, but Livy tells us that it was near Stobi. The editors of the Barrington Atlas of the Greek and Roman World suggest a site near Črnobuki in North Macedonia.
