= Paeoplae =

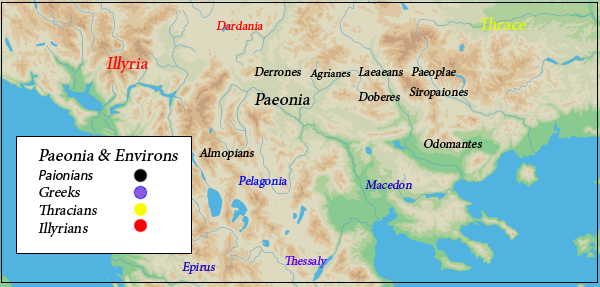
Paeonia, tribes and environs

Paeoplae (Ancient Greek: Παιόπλαι) were an ancient Paeonian tribe. The name is suggested to have Thracian origin.

== See also ==
- Peltast
