= Domeros =

Coordinates: 40°56′45″N 23°55′20″E

Domeros was a settlement in ancient Macedonia, which in the time of the Roman Empire, had a mutatio, or place for changing horses, on the Via Egnatia. It was situated between Amphipolis and Philippi, 13 M. P. from the former and 19 M. P. from the latter.

The site of Domeros is near the modern Domiros.
