= Agrianes =

Ancient Paeonian tribe

Paeonia, tribes and environs

The Agrianes (Ancient Greek: Ἀγριᾶνες, Agrianes or Ἀγρίαι, Agriai) or Agrianians, were a Paeonian or Thracian tribe, whose country was centered at Upper Strymon, in present-day central Western Bulgaria as well as southeasternmost Serbia, at the time situated north of the Dentheletae. Per Strabo, the source of the river Strymon was within Agrianes' territory. In the time of Philip II of Macedon, the territory of the Agrianes was administered by Pella and they fought under the command of General Attalus. They were crack javelin throwers and an elite unit of Alexander the Great's light infantry.

== Etymology and tribal belonging ==
Their name in Ancient Greek was Ἀγρίανες. The ethnonym is of Indo-European origin, it may have been derived from *agro- "field" (cf. Lat. ager, Grc. ἀγρός agros, Eng. acre). Irwin L. Merker considers it purely Hellenic, and lists certain Greek cognates, such as the ethnonym of the Doric tribe Agraioi in Aetolia and the month Agrianos, which is found throughout the Dorian and Aeolian worlds. An early name of the Rhodopes was Achrida, which may also be a cognate.

Pausanias described that Paeon, the eponymous ancestor of the Paeonians (of whom Agrianes were members), was a brother of Epeius and Aetolus, the eponymous ancestors of the Epeians of Elis and the Aetolians respectively. Their place-name has several cognates in Greece such as Παιονίδαι (Paeonidai), a deme of the tribe Leontis in Attica. A place in the Argolid also has the same name.

Herodotus described them as a Paeonian tribe, together with the Odomanti and Doberes in the vicinity of Pangaeum. Although the Agrianes clearly fell within the Thracian sphere of influence, the only writer who describes them as Thracians is Theopompus.

== Geography ==
Their country was centered at Upper Strymon, in present-day westernmost Bulgaria, and also held areas of southeasternmost Serbia, at the time situated north of the Dentheletae. In the times of Philip II, the territory of the Agrianes was administered by Pella. According to some Bulgarian researchers, they inhabited an ethnocultural region known today as "Graovo", whose name probably derives from that of the Agrianes. Its location is in the central and eastern areas of modern-day Pernik Province.

== Military ==
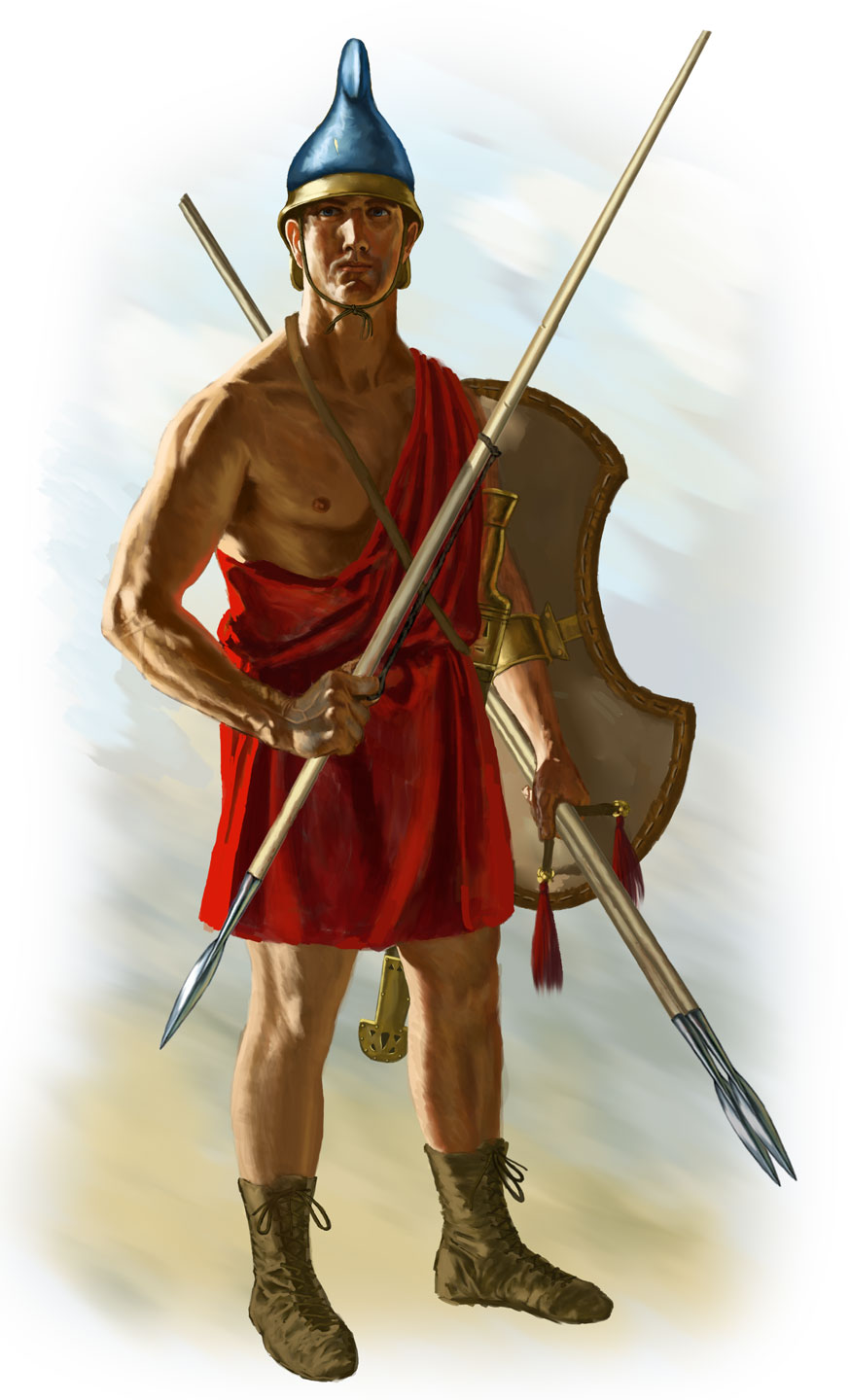
Agrianian peltast

The peltasts raised from the Agrianes were the elite light infantry of the Macedonian army. They were often used to cover the right flank of the army in battle, being posted to the right of the Companion cavalry, a position of considerable honour. They were almost invariably part of any force on detached duty, especially missions requiring speed of movement.

Peltasts were armed with a number of javelins and a sword, carried a light shield but wore no armour, though they sometimes had helmets; they were adept at skirmishing and were often used to guard the flanks of more heavily equipped infantry. They usually adopted an open order when facing enemy heavy infantry. They could throw their javelins at will at the enemy and, unencumbered by armour or heavy shields, easily evade any counter-charges made by heavily equipped hoplites. They were, however, quite vulnerable to shock-capable cavalry and often operated to particular advantage on broken ground where cavalry was useless and heavy infantry found it difficult to maintain formation.

== History ==
They are first mentioned regarding Megabazus' campaign in 511 BC. In 429 BC they were subject to the Odrysian kingdom and later, as early as 352 BC, they became allies of Philip II of Macedonia.

They fought under king Langarus with the Macedonians against the Triballians in 335 BC and succeeded in protecting the lands of Alexander and were thus rewarded with the right to govern themselves, a move that led to a long-lasting and most reliable alliance. At the Battle of Gaugamela (331 BC), during Alexander the Great's conquest of Persia, their contingent of peltasts numbered 1,000 men. During the time of the Seleucid Empire, a crack unit of Antiochus' Agrianes was brigaded together with Persians at Raphia. Contingents from the Agrianes and the Penestae, numbering 800 and 2,000 men respectively, were a part of the garrison of Cassandreia at the time of the Third Macedonian War.

== See also ==
- Peltast
- Osogovo

== Bibliography ==
- Ashley, J.R. (2004) The Macedonian Empire: The Era of Warfare Under Philip II and Alexander the Great, 359-323 B.C. McFarland.
- Connolly, P. (1981) Greece and Rome at War. Macdonald Phoebus, London. ISBN 1-85367-303-X
- Sidnell, P. (2006) Warhorse: Cavalry in Ancient Warfare, Continuum, London.
- Viktorija Sokolovska, Pajonskoto Pleme Agrijani i vrskite so Damastion, Macedonia acta Archaeologica 11, Skopje 1990, 9-34. (with summary in French).
- Viktorija Sokolovska, The Coinage of Agrianes, MACEDONIAN NUMISMATIC JOURNAL no. 2, Skopje 1996, 13-22.
- Viktorija Sokolovska, Materijalna kultura Agrijana, Patrimonium Mk no. 16, Skopje 2018, 79-102.
