= Stobi =

Archaeological site in North Macedonia, ancient town of Paeonia

- Стоби (Macedonian)
- Stoboi
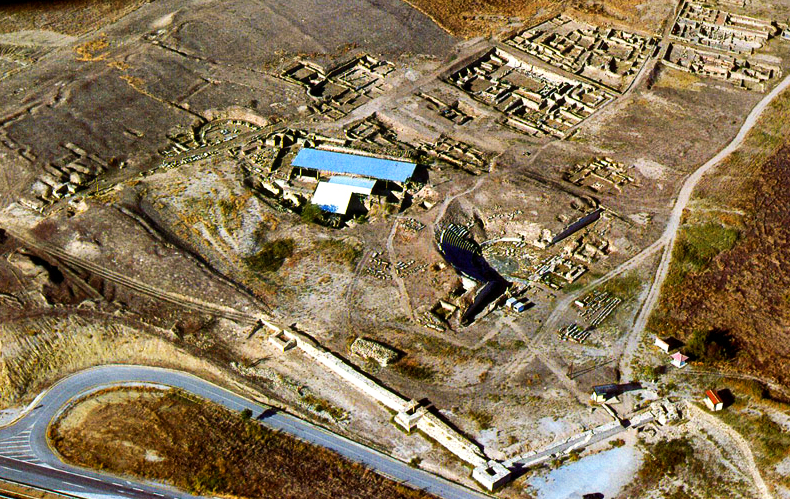
- Aerial view of main excavation area

- Location within North Macedonia
- 41°33′06″N 21°58′30″E
- Type: Settlement
- Location: Gradsko, Vardar Statistical Region, Republic of North Macedonia
- Region: Paeonia

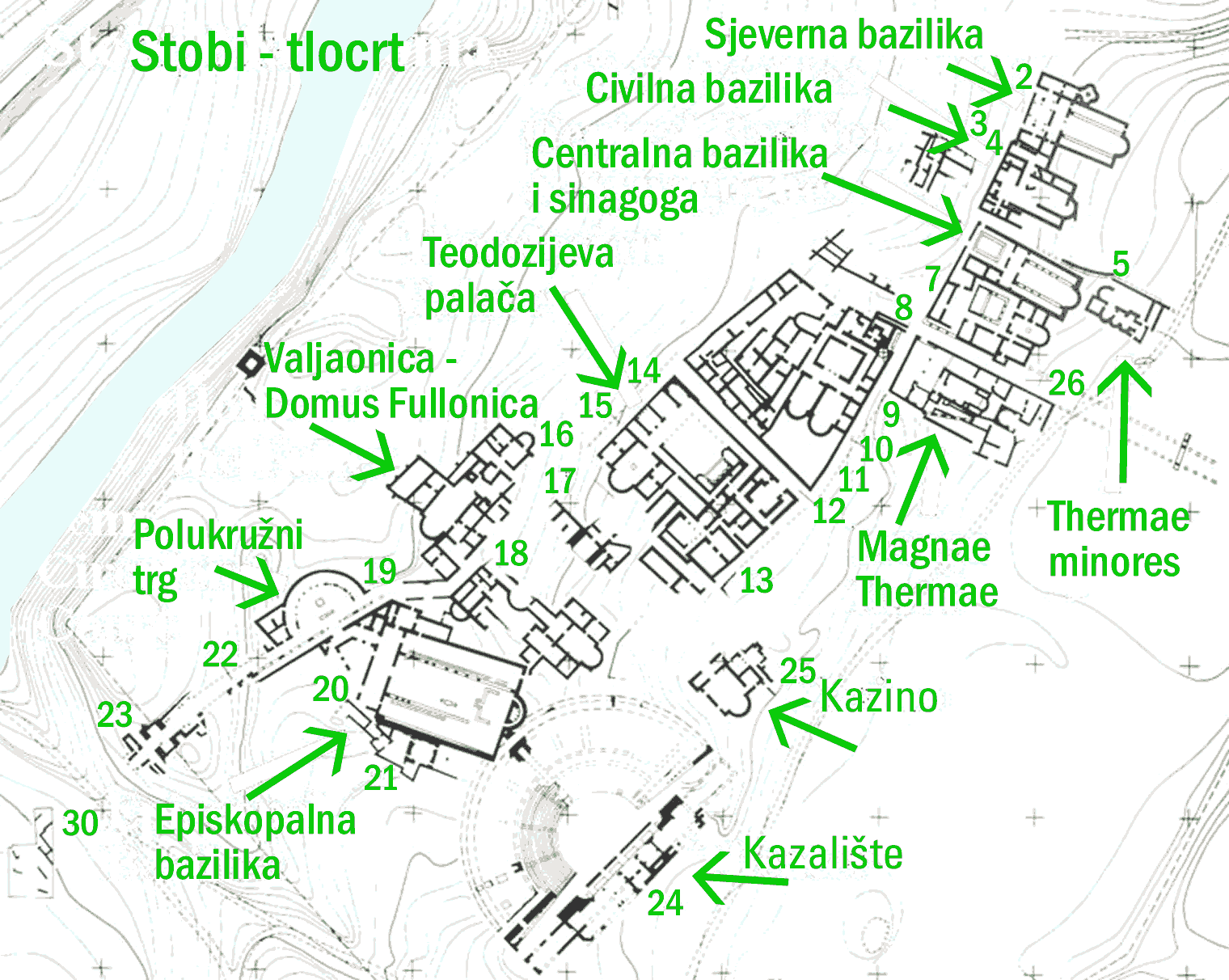
Map of the site

Stobi or Stoboi (Ancient Greek: Στόβοι, romanized: Stóboi; Latin: Stobi; Macedonian: Стоби;), was an ancient town of Paeonia, later conquered by Macedon, and finally turned into the capital of the Roman province of Macedonia Salutaris. It is located near Gradsko, North Macedonia, on the main road that leads from the Danube to the Aegean Sea. Archeological excavations have shown Stobi was built where the Erigon (Crna River) joins the Axios (Vardar), making it strategically important as a center for both trade and warfare. In early times, the chief town and seat of the Paeonian kings was Bylazora but later, the seat of the kings was moved to Stobi.

== Pre-Roman period ==
Stobi developed from a Paeonian settlement established in the Archaic period. Located on the northern side of a terrace, the early town covered an area of about 25,000 m^{2} (270,000 ft^{2}). Its proximity to the junction of the Erigón and Axiós Rivers as well as its position in the fertile central Vardar valley allowed it quickly to develop a flourishing economy and to establish trade. Nearby Mount Klepa was a lucrative source of marble. The initial Paeonian population was later supplemented by other immigrant groups.

It is believed that in 217 BCE, Philip V annexed Paionia during his campaign against the Dardani who had entered Bylazora, the largest Paeonian town.

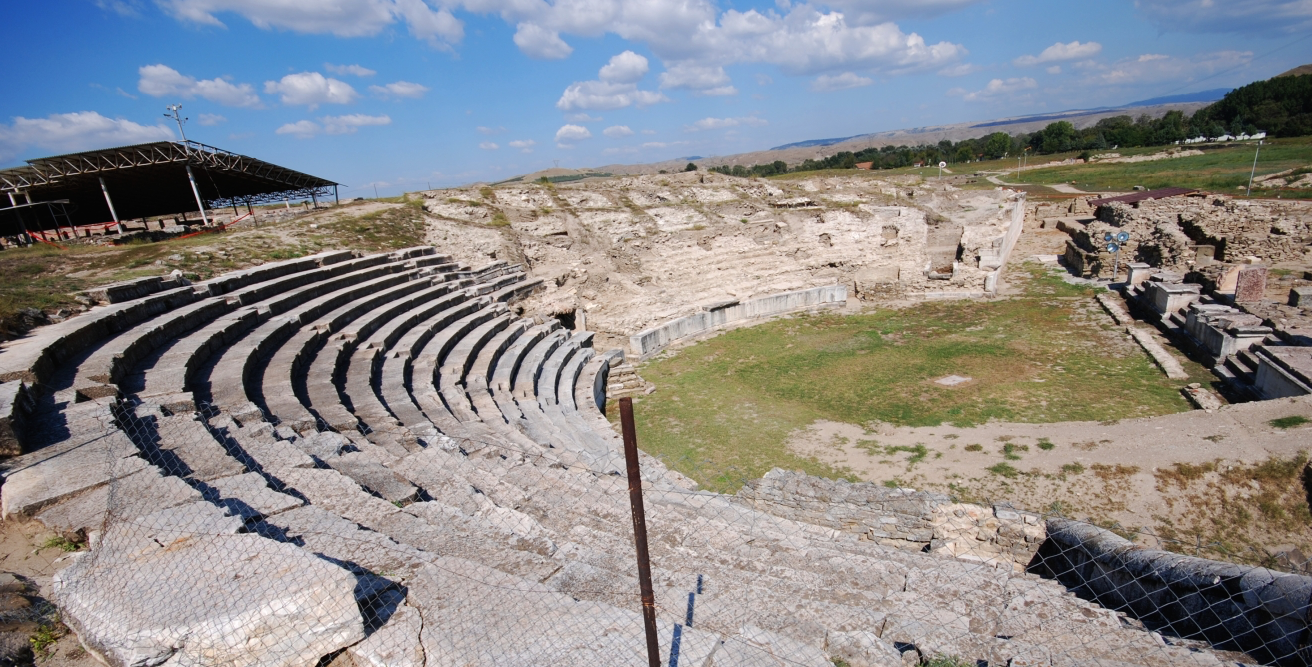
The Roman theater at Stobi

== Roman period ==
The city was first mentioned in writing by the historian Livy, in connection with a victory of Philip V of Macedon over the Dardani in 197 BC. In 168 BC, the Romans defeated Perseus and Macedonia was divided into four nominally independent republics. In 148 BC, the four areas of Macedonia were brought together in a unified Roman province. In the reign of Augustus the city grew in size and population. The city grew further in 69 BC once it became a municipium, at which time it began to produce coins printed with Municipium Stobensium. The citizens of Stobi enjoyed Ius Italicum and were citizens of Rome. Most belonged to the Roman tribes Aemila and Tromentina. During Roman times Stobi was the capital of the Roman province Macedonia Salutaris. Emperor Theodosius I stayed in Stobi in 388. Late in the 5th century the city underwent a terrible turn of events. In 479, it was sacked by Theodoric, an Ostrogothic king. The citizens reconstructed the city, but in 518 it was struck by a powerful earthquake. Avaro-Slavic invasions in the 6th century destroyed the city's economy and infrastructure.

== Etymology ==
The name Stobi is thought to have been a Paeonian word meaning "post, pillar" and is akin to Old Prussian stabis "rock," Old Church Slavonic stoborъ, stъlbъ "post, pillar," English staff, Old English stapol "post archaic Greek stobos "scolding, bad languagebk stephein "to tie around, encircle," staphyle "grapevine, grape bunch," and Middle Irish sab "shaft." Such a name suggests that it was the site of a large local cultic pillar, though there is no evidence of this.

== History of excavation ==
The Museum of Belgrade was the first and only institution to investigate the city from 1924 to 1936. Yugoslavian archaeologists first discovered public and private buildings in the city and then the city's theater, built in the 3rd century, and religious artifacts from the central and western part of the city. Research into the city officially ended in 1940. During World War II late Hellenistic graves were found in the Palace of Peristerius, many of which had been covered by buildings. In 1970, between the North and Central Basilica and in the western necropolis 55 graves were discovered. In 1955 in the southern part of the North Basilica 23 Slavic graves dating from the 9th to 12th centuries were discovered. Bronze statues from the archaic and classical periods as well as ceramic objects from the Neolithic era were discovered in the two parts of the civil basilica. An older part of the second synagogue was discovered in the Central Basilica, as well as architectonic structures and 23 Slavic graves in the North Basilica. The most significant finds were uncovered between 1970 and 1980 by Yugoslav and American archaeologists. In this period more buildings were discovered and new expeditions in the western necropolis, the Casa Romana and in the aqueduct network of Stobi revealed more mosaics. From 1981 to 1988 the Episcopal Basilica was unearthed. These investigations confirmed predictions concerning the religion, culture and daily life of its population.

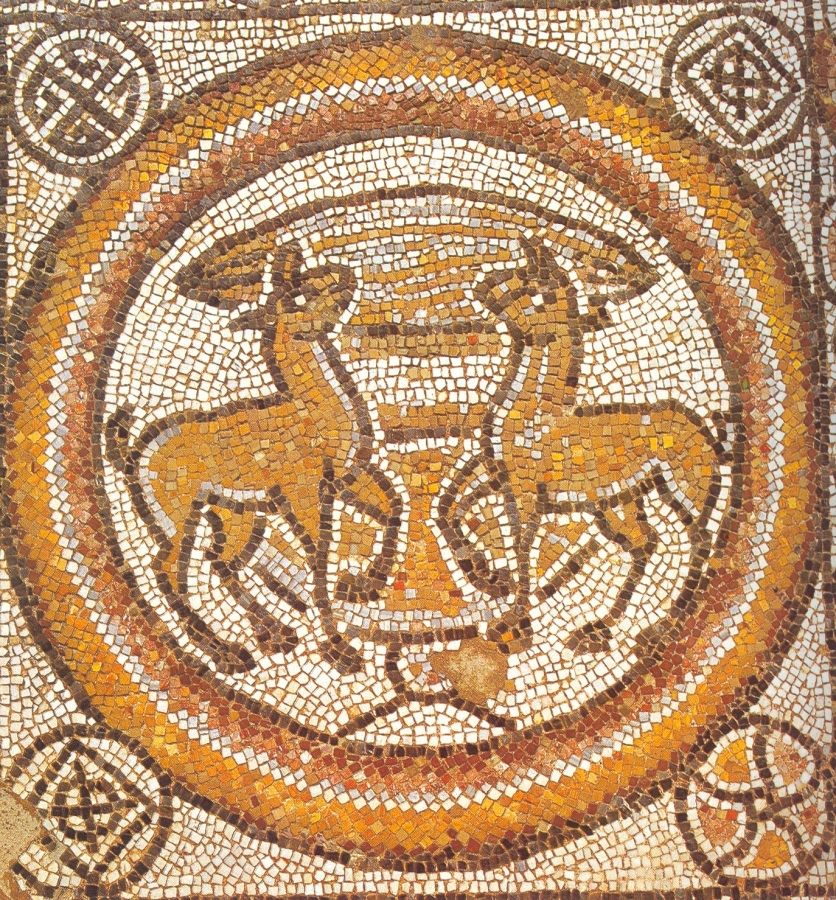
Mosaic at Stobi

The ethnonym Albanos was found on a funeral inscription from ancient Stobi in 1992. The inscription in ancient Greek reads "ΦΛ(ΑΒΙΩ) ΑΛΒΑΝΩ ΤΩ ΤΕΚΝΩ ΑΙΜΙΛΙΑΝΟΣ ΑΛΒΑΝΟ(Σ) ΜΝΗΜ(Η)Σ [ΧΑΡΙΝ]" ("To the child Flavios Albanos; Aemilianos Albanos (erected this) in memory thereof"). It dates to the 2nd/3rd century AD. A well-preserved marble head of Augustus was unearthed at Stobi in April 2009.

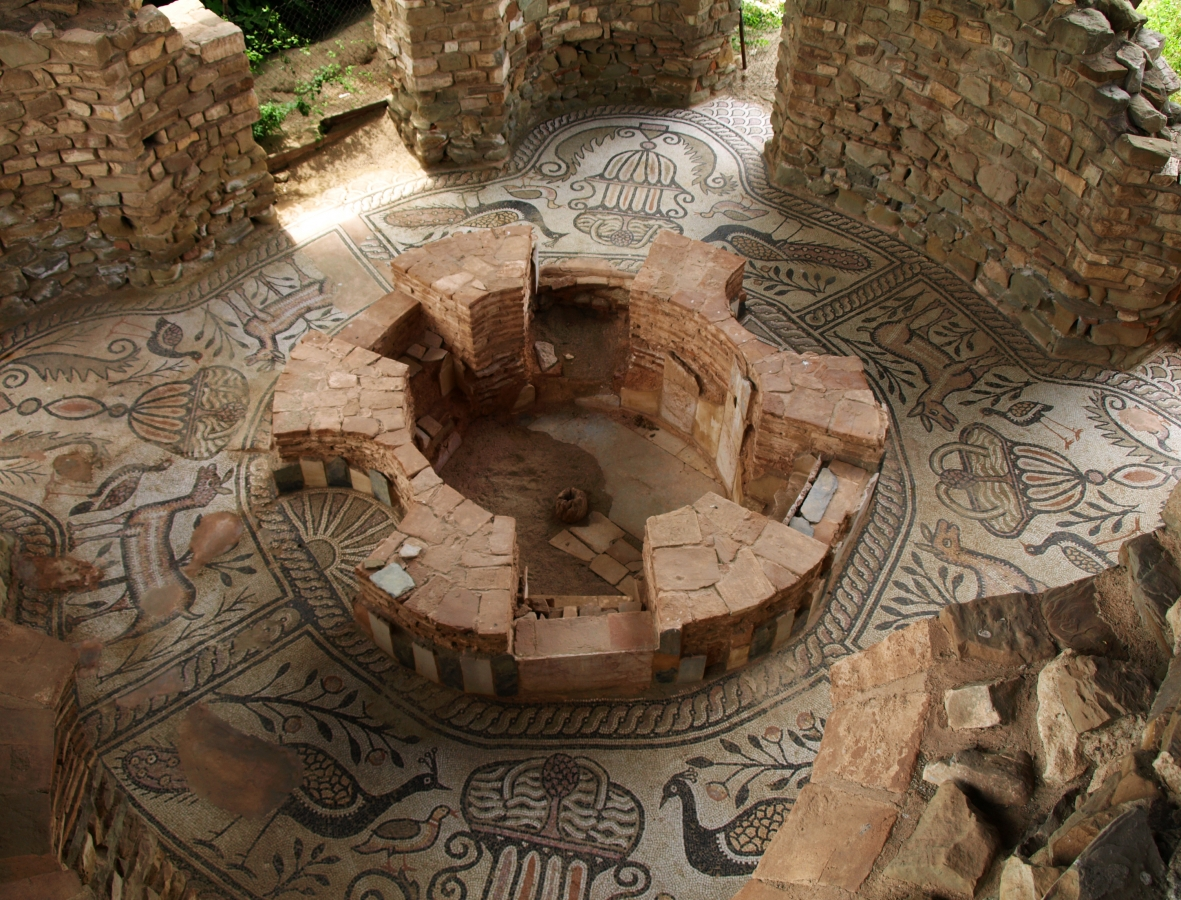
Baptisterium in the basilica

== Religion in Stobi ==
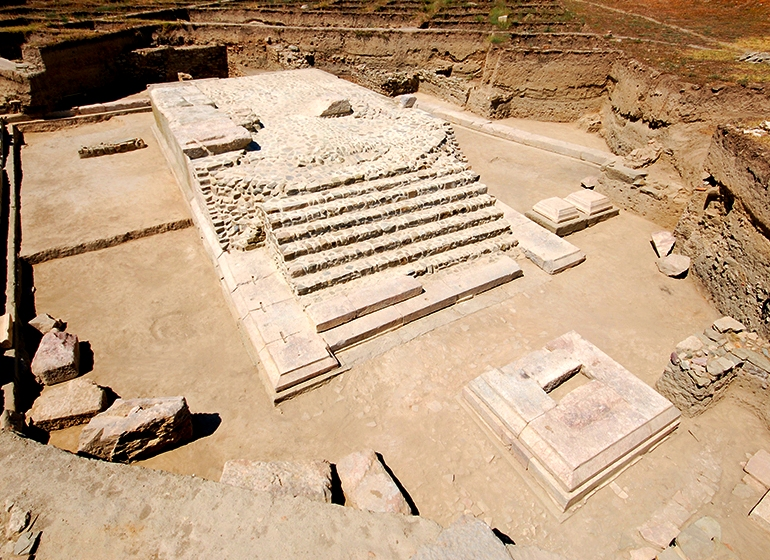
Temple of Isis at Stobi

The Grand Palace near the eastern wall of the city was built during the Roman period and contains frescoes. The Temple of Nemesis in the theater, and religious items related to Hygeia and Telesphorus, Artemis Locheia, Apollo Clarious, Jupiter, Dionysus and Hera were common during this time. In the early Christian period Stobi was an episcopal see by 325, when the bishop Budius took part in the First Council of Nicaea. Stobi is one of a small number of cities from the late antique and early Christian period that kept a large number of mosaics. From the 4th to 5th century, several big churches were built and were known for their interior decoration of mosaics and frescoes. Decorative mosaics can also be found in private luxury buildings from late Antiquity, such as the Villas of Theodosius, Policharmosius and Peristerius. New archaeological research has shown that all Christian basilicas in the city discovered thus far were built over ancient buildings.

An ancient synagogue dating from the 2nd century AD, rebuilt in the 3rd or 4th century, attests to a Jewish presence in the city. A second- or third-century column inscription documents the construction of portions of a synagogue by a Roman citizen named Tiberius Polymarchos. He identifies himself as the "father of the synagogue" and describes himself as a "follower of all Jewish prescriptions." Also written, likely in reference to the patriarchate of Israel, was: “If anyone should wish to change anything about the buildings, he shall pay 250,000 denarii to the Patriarch, as we have agreed." Archaeological evidence for a Jewish presence also include a bronze seal adorned with a menorah. By the close of the 4th century, this synagogue was demolished and replaced by a Christian basilica.

== Historical sites in Stobi ==
The Northern Basilica has three main parts: a narthex, an exonarthex separated by colonnades and an atrium constructed mostly of marble. In the northern part there is a baptistry and in the southern part are Slavic graves. The church, which was built at the beginning of the 5th century, can be entered from the street Via Principalis Inferior. The Civil Basilica is south of the north basilica and was discovered in 1937. In 1956 archaeologists found that there were seven building phases. Between the North and Civil Basilicas are the ancient Thermae Minores, or "Little Baths" made of stone blocks.

The Central Basilica and synagogue can be entered from the Via Principalis street. The Central Basilica was built on a synagogue at the beginning of the 5th century and had two building phases. The floor of the synagogue was discovered 1.5 m (4.9 ft) under the level of the Central Basilica. Dating from the 4th century, it was built on an older synagogue from the 3rd century, created by the father of the Synagogue of Stobi, Tiberius Claudius Polycharmos. Inside were two vases dating from 121 to 125.

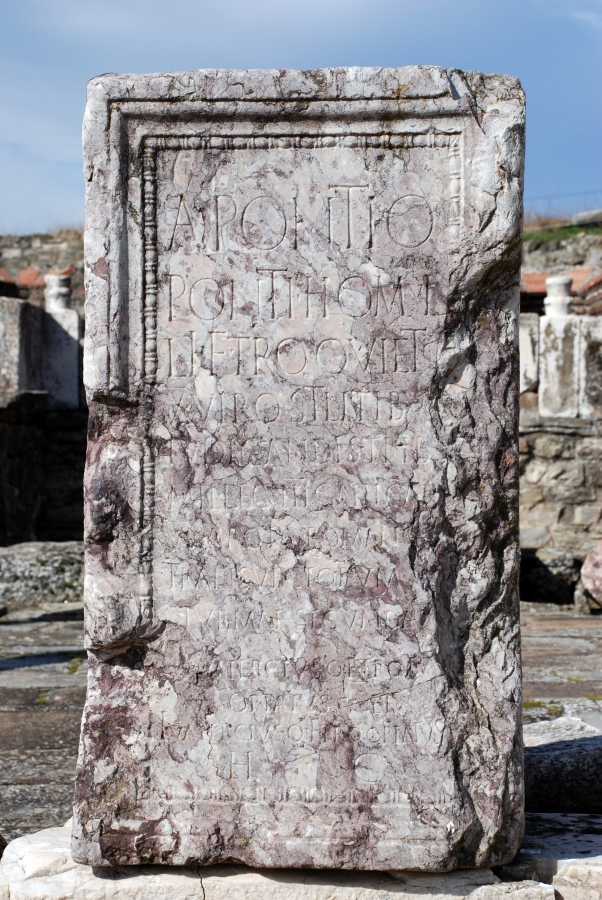
Inscription at Stobi

The House of the Psalms, in front of the Central Basilica, has a central room with a mosaic floor, a room with colonnades, a big pool and columns in the western part of the yard.

Via Axia is one of the main streets in Stobi, oriented east-west. Only a small part of the street has been discovered.

The Main Town Public Fountain is located on a small square created by the streets Via Axia and Via Principalis Inferior.

The Magnae Thermae, or Big Bath, discovered in 1931, consisted of two rooms: one large room with a statue and a pool made of stone blocks. The reconstructed bath was in use until the late 6th century.

Via Principalis Inferior was a major street of the city running from the central basilica to the main town fountain, then to house of Partenius, the 'Palace of Theodosius' and the house of Psalms.

The House of Peristerius was a large living complex for several families and also had rooms for shops. The Peristerius family owned the rooms in the southern part of the complex. The central part of this complex is a yard under open sky, with fountains on the western side. In the eastern part is an excellent example of floor mosaics and in the middle there is a fountain made of marble. The complex and the mosaics date from the late 4th or the early 5th century. The Via Theodosia street is parallel to Via Axia and it is located between the house of Peristerius and the 'palace of Theodosius'.

The Palace of Theodosius was where the emperor Theodosius first stayed while in Stobi. The floor is covered with marble blocks and the peristyle with mosaics in the technique opus sectile. The other rooms are also decorated, dating from the 4th to the 5th century.

The House of Partenius is located near the southern part of the Palace of Theodosius, and is connected to it by a wall making it into an L-shaped building.

Valavica (Domus Fullonica) is a complex of connected shops and residences, built on older objects. The name describes only an earlier phase of the complex, as later in the 5th century there was also a workshop for painting and making carpets. The complex was in use from the 1st century to the 6th century.

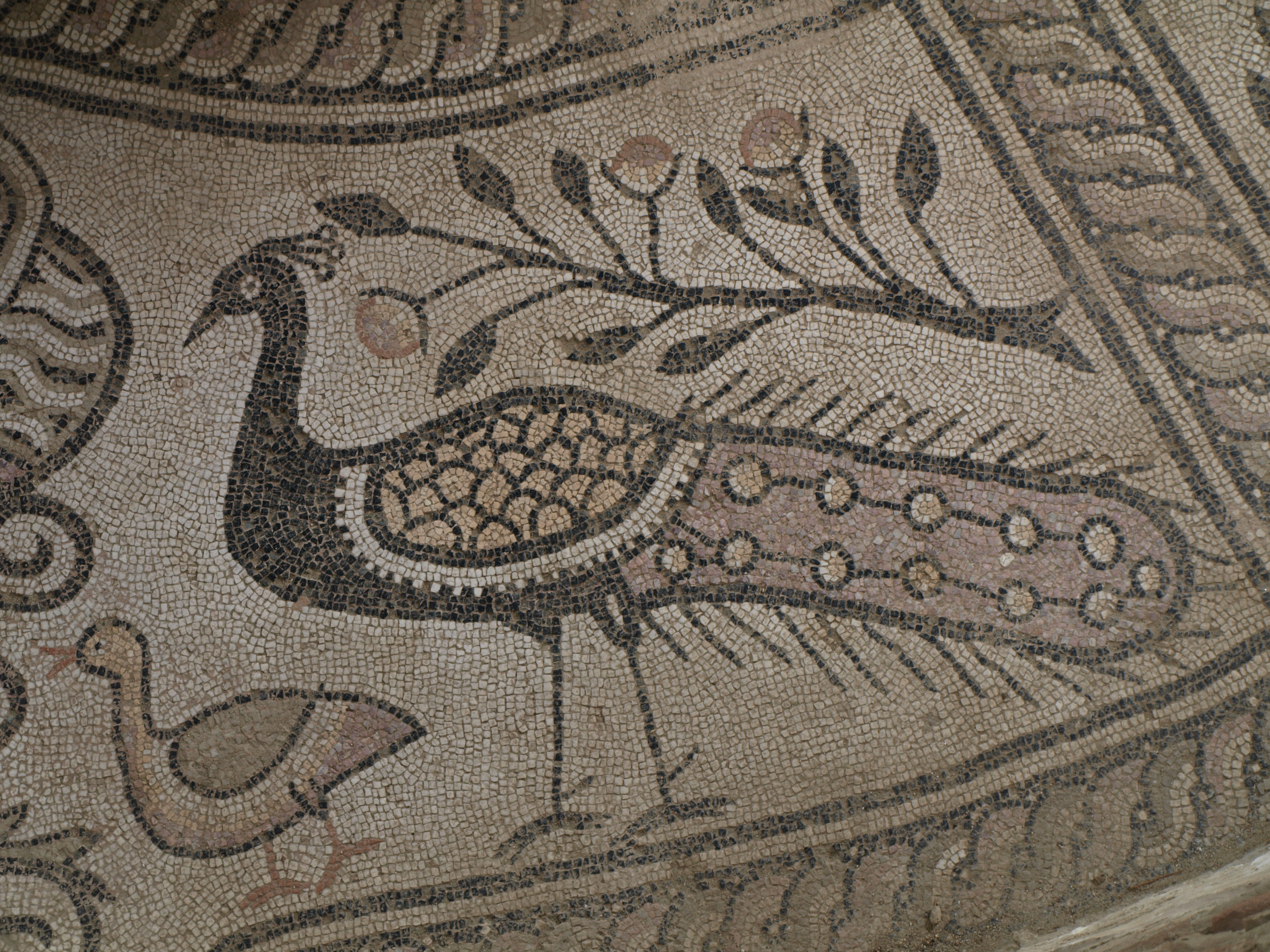
A peacock mosaic from Stobi, now depicted on North Macedonia's currency

The Episcopal Basilica, dating from the 5th and 6th centuries, with a baptistery to the south. A peacock from the baptistery's mosaic floor is depicted on the reverse of the Macedonian 10 denars banknote, issued in 1996, and of the 10 denars coin, issued in 2008.

== See also ==
- Heraclea Lyncestis
- Scupi
- Nikola Vulić
