= League of the Macedonians =

Confederationally-organized commonwealth institution

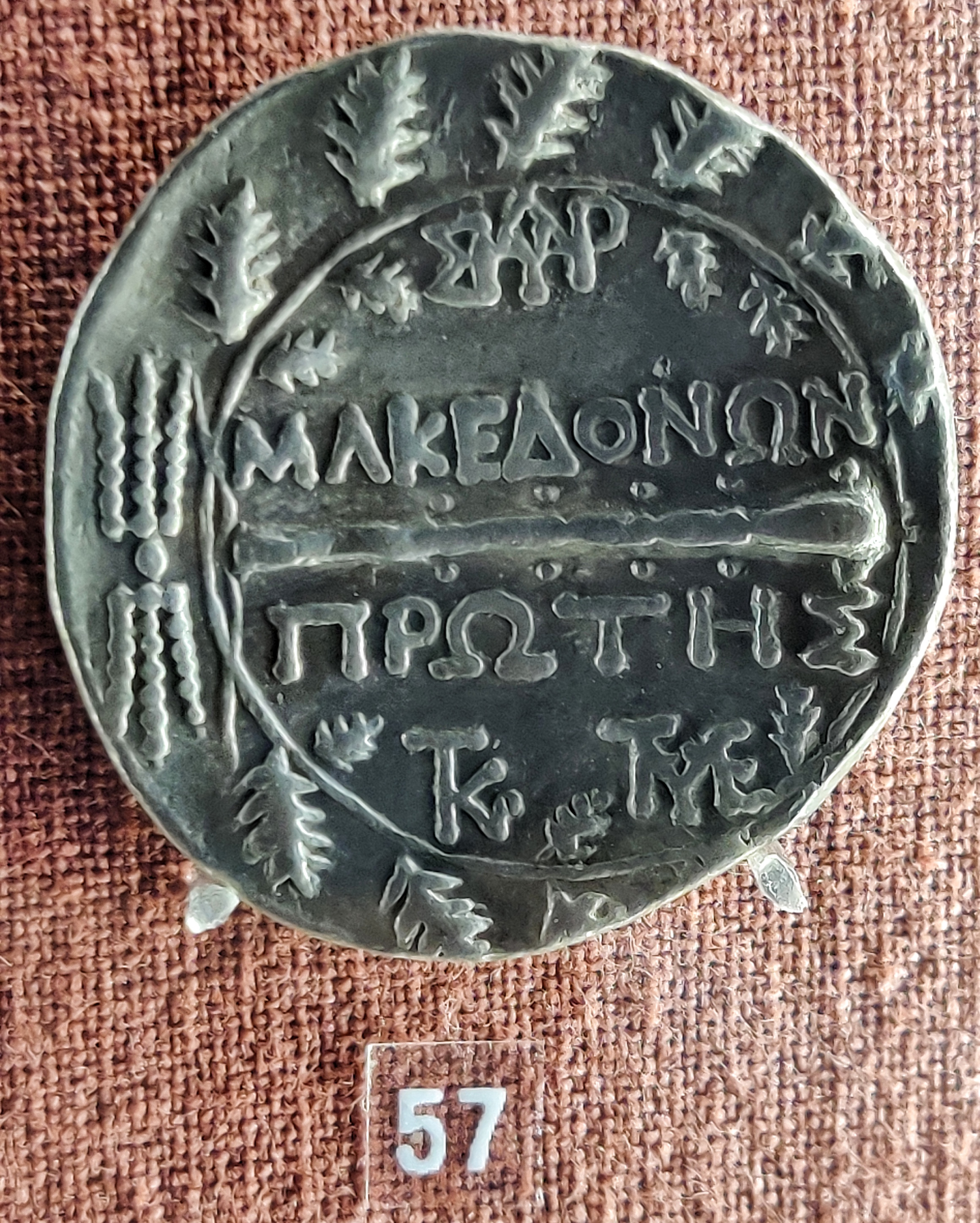
Coin of the first region of the Macedonian League in the Numismatic Museum of Athens with the Greek inscription "ΜΑΚΕΔΟΝΩΝ ΠΡΩΤΗΣ" ("Of the Macedonians of the First")

The League of the Macedonians or Koinon of Macedonia (Ancient Greek: Κοινὸν Μακεδόνων, romanized: Koinòn Makedónōn), was a confederationally-organized commonwealth institution or koinon, consisting of all Macedonian communities united around a monarch. It can be paralleled from the Epirote League, but it seems that the Macedonian koinon had far less power than that of the Epirote Molossians. The capital, or headquarters, of the Macedonian koinon was the city of Beroia.

== History ==
Both numismatic and inscriptional evidence attest to the existence of the Macedonian koinon before and after the Roman conquest of Macedon. Coinage in the name of the "Macedonians" (i.e., ΜΑΚΕΔΟΝΩΝ) was in continuous production from the reigns of Philip V (r. 238–179 BC) and Perseus (r. 212–166 BC) well into the Roman period. It was reorganized under the early Roman Empire and transformed into an institution related to the imperial cult as happened to all the koina of the period.

The koinon, administered by local elite members, organized and financed games and festivals and were awarded Roman citizenship. Using traditional ethnic symbols depicted on its coins, such as the Macedonian shield and the winged thunderbolt, the koinon preserved a sense of Macedonian civic identity within the province until the end of the 2nd century AD. The last attestation of a person "ethnically" identified as Macedonian is dated to the beginning of the 4th century AD.
