= Bylazora =

Paeonian city

- Vilazora
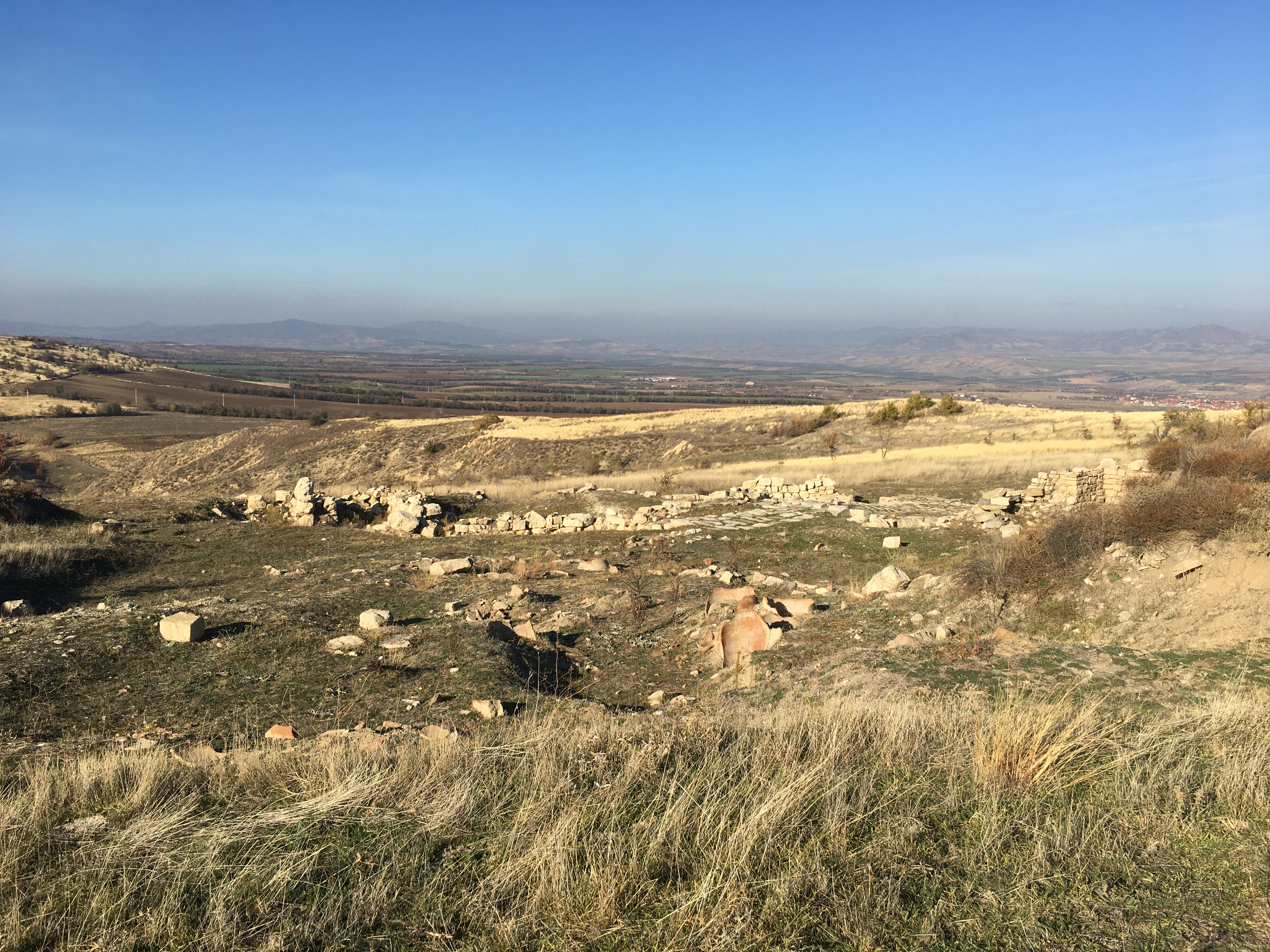

- Location within North Macedonia
- 41°50′50″N 21°54′46″E
- Type: Settlement
- Location: Knezhje, Sveti Nikole Municipality, Republic of North Macedonia
- Region: Paeonia

Bylazora or Vilazora (Greek: Βιλαζόρα Macedonian: Вилазора) was a Paeonian city from the period of early classic antiquity. It is located near the village of Knezhje, which is part of the municipality of Sveti Nikole in North Macedonia. In early times, the chief town and seat of the Paeonian kings was Bylazora on the Vardar; later, the seat of the kings was moved to Stobi.

== History ==
Polybius tells us:

King Philip V captured Bylazora, the largest town of Paeonia, and very favourably situated for commanding the pass from Dardania to Macedonia: so that by this achievement he was all but entirely freed from any fear of the Dardani, it being no longer easy for them to invade Macedonia, as long as this city gave Philip the command of the pass.

In 219 BC, the Dardanians collected their forces for a raid into Macedonia and at that time Bylazora must already have been in their hands. With its location at Sveti Nikole, Bylazora commanded the entrance to a long defile and, no less important, a route southwestwards into Pelagonia via the Babuna Valley, or Raec Valley into Styberra and interior of the Macedonian Kingdom. It can be assumed that Bylazora, as the largest Paeonian town, must have been in Dardanian possession when Philip V captured it in 217 BC, with the aim of garrisoning it and ending Dardanian raids. Bylazora is also mentioned by Livy in his "The History of Rome" when Perseus in 168 BC arranged military support from the Gauls who were campaigning in Desudaba, Maedica, requesting the Gaulish army to shift their camp to Bylazora, a place in Paeonia, and their officers to go in a body to him at Almana on the River Axius. The geographic dominance over the surrounding valley has determined the communications significance of the city in ancient times. It was situated between the states (or sometimes provinces) of the Dardani, and of Thrace and Macedonia. Ancient Bylazora was the largest and most significant city of Paionia, mentioned in the records of Polybius and Titus Livius. They emphasize its strategic geographic position as a frontier of the northern border of Macedonia against the Dardanians.

According to experts, there are two significant dates related to the relations between ancient Macedonia and Bylazora: The first is 217 BC when king Philip V of Macedonia reconstructed its fortifications; The second is 168 BC when king Perseus of Macedonia, during the Third Macedonian War, arranged military support from the Gauls who were camping nearby in defending the city against the Romans.

== Discovery ==
A strange fabrication, to the effect that Bylazora was located at the village of Kneze near Sveti Nikole stems from professor Ivan Mikulcic, who in 1976 set foot on the hill called Safara and claimed "this is Bylazora" without presenting a single substantial fact. In that manner he was able to move the ancient Bylazora on the bank of the Axius River to the inland of Paeonia at Kneze near Sveti Nikole.

In August 2008, a team of researchers led by archaeologist Boban Husenovski from the National Museum of Macedonia with the participation of researchers from the Texas Foundation for Archaeological & Historical Research discovered the main gate of a city, fortification walls, and plenty of small archaeological finds that have been dated to between the 6th and 3rd century BC.

From these findings, they have been able to confirm that these are in fact the remains of the ancient Paeonian city of Bylazora.
