= Audoleon =

King of Paeonia, c. 315 – c. 285/4 BC

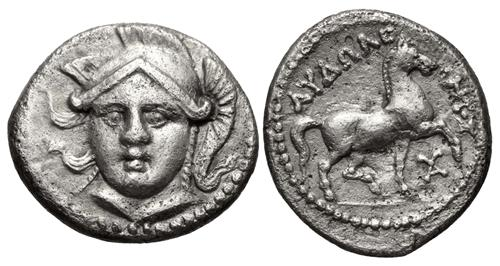
- Silver tetradrachm struck during the early part of Audoleon's reign. Obv.: head of Athena with Attic helmet; rev.: horse walking right

King of Paeonia
- Reign: 315–285/4 BC
- Predecessor: Patraus
- Successor: Ariston (son of Audoleon)
- Born: Unknown
- Died: 285/4 BC
- Spouse: unknown
- Issue: Ariston; Leon unnamed daughter
- Religion: Ancient Greek religion

Audoleon (Ancient Greek: Αὐδωλέων, romanized: Audōléōn) was king of the ancient kingdom of Paeonia from 315 until his death in 285 or 284 BC. He succeeded his father, Patraus, under unknown circumstances.

== Early life ==
Around 310, Audoleon asked and received help from Cassander, King of Macedonia, in defeating an invasion of the Illyrian Autariatae after they had overrun the upper Axius valley. The 20,000 survivors were, along with their wives and children, settled in the border territory of Parorbelia by Cassander.

== Basileus of Paeonia ==
In 306, Demetrius Poliocretes inflicted a crushing defeat on the king of Ptolemaic Egypt, Ptolemy Soter, in a naval battle near Salamis in Cyprus. Following this victory, Antigonus Monophthalmus, Demetrius' father, assumed the diadem and proclaimed himself basileus. The other Diadochi, who had thus far avoided formal royal titles, began to also style themselves as kings.

To emphasize Paeonia's independence, Audoleon also declared himself king, becoming one of the first lesser Hellenistic kings to do so.

This change in status was reflected in his currency: earlier issues depicted the head of Athena, whilst Attic-weight tetradrachms struck later in Audoleon's reign imitated the coinage of Alexander the Great. The adoption of a royal title, as well as a new coinage type, was part of a larger Hellenization process that further integrated Paeonia with the greater Greek-speaking world. This is evidenced by Audoleon's ties with other Hellenistic monarchs and cities, particularly Paeonia's traditional ally, Athens.

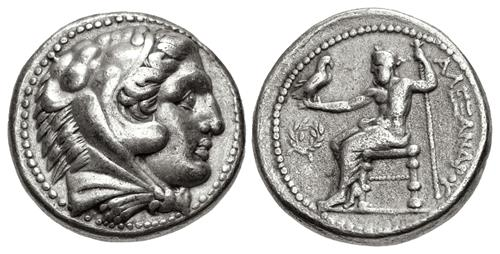
Silver tetradrachm struck late in Audoleon's reign in imitation of Alexander III. Obv.: head of Herakles wearing lion skin; rev.: Zeus holding eagle seated facing left

In 294, Demetrius was proclaimed king by the Macedonians at Larissa following his murder of Cassander's son, Alexander V.

Nearby rulers, such as the Epirote king Pyrrhus and the Diadochos Lysimachus, were hostile to Demetrius' ambitions and formed a coalition against him, to which Audoleon participated.

=== Alliance with Athens ===
In 287, Athens, which had been under Antigonid domination since 307, revolted and Demetrius blockaded the city from Piraeus, their principal port, in an effort to starve them into submission. In the spring of 284, the city received a gift of 7,500 medimnoi of wheat from Audoleon and 15,000 medimnoi from Spartokos III, king of the Bosporan Kingdom. (Note: A medimnos of grain weighed roughly 40 kilograms. Therefore, 7,500 medimnoi weighed approximately 300,000kg. Audoleon's gift was likely then transported in at least two ships to alternative harbors far from Piraeus.)

A later inscription records that Audoleon was honored by the Athenians with not only citizenship for himself and his descendants, but also a golden wreath and a bronze equestrian statue in the Agora. His courtier was also honored for his efforts in delivering the grain. This is the last mention of Audoleon before his death in 285 or 284 BC.

== Aftermath ==
Audoleon had at least three children with an unknown spouse: Ariston, Leon, and a daughter. His daughter, who remains unnamed in the sources, married Pyrrhus in a bid by the Epirote king to secure the support of nearby barbarians like the Paeonians.

== See also ==
- Paeonian language
