= Balduin Saria =

Central European historian (1893–1974)

Professor Balduin Saria
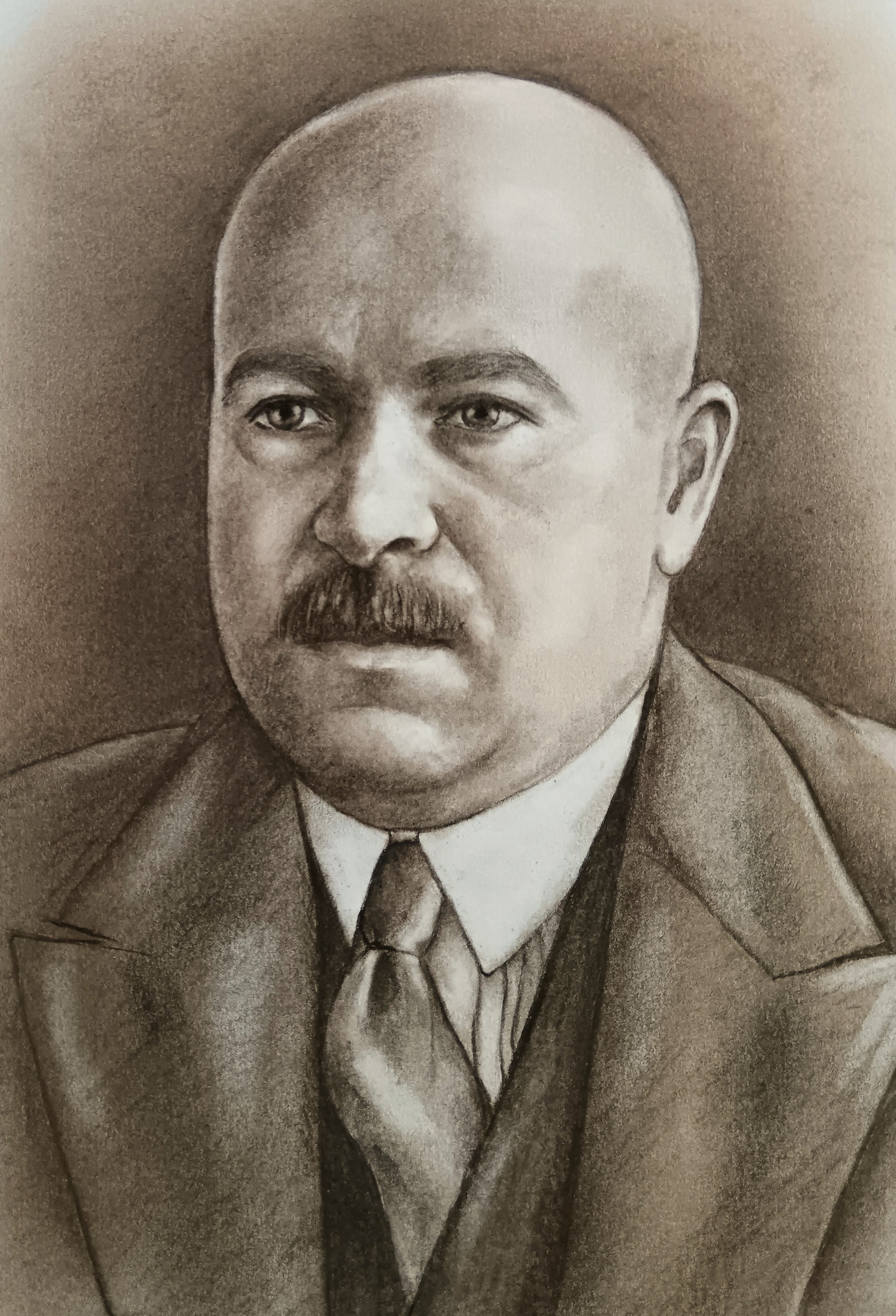
- Born: 5 June 1893; Ptuj, Austria-Hungarian Empire (now in Slovenia)
- Died: 3 June 1974 (aged 80); Graz, Austria
- Occupation: Historian
- Spouse: Jolanthe Saria b. Hartmann (m. 1928)
- Children: Reingard Jolanta (1931) and Gertruda Katarina (1935)

Academic background
- Education: University of Vienna

Balduin Saria (born 5 June 1893 in Ptuj (Pettau in German), Lower Styria, died 3 June 1974 in Graz, Austria) was a classical historian, archeologist, epigraphist and numismatist.

After receiving his doctorate in the field of prehistory and classical archaeology from the University of Vienna in 1921 he was employed as a librarian in the university's Archaeological-Epigraphic Seminar. In 1922 he moved to Belgrade, as the head of the Prehistoric, Roman and Numismatic Department in the Yugoslavian National Museum. In 1926 he started to teach prehistory, classical archeology and numismatics at the University of Ljubljana. After Italy occupied the southern part of Slovenia including Ljubljana in 1941, Saria moved to Styria, to teach Roman antiquity and epigraphy at the University of Graz.

His academic career came to an abrupt end in 1945; he was forced into early retirement.

== Photo gallery ==
It contains photos of Saria's birthtown and of several Roman monuments, the discovery of which took place in his youth and greatly changed the Slovenian archaeological landscape. The first photo shows the Roman relief built into the outer wall of the house where Saria was born.

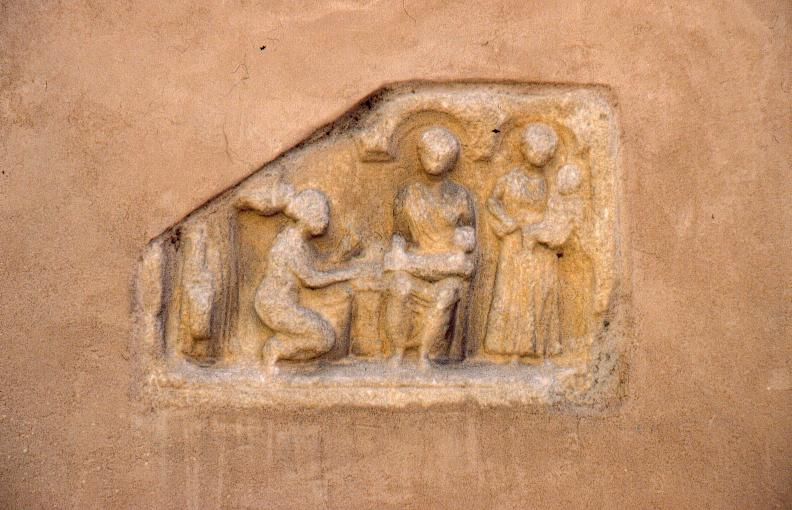
Nutrices-dedicated relief

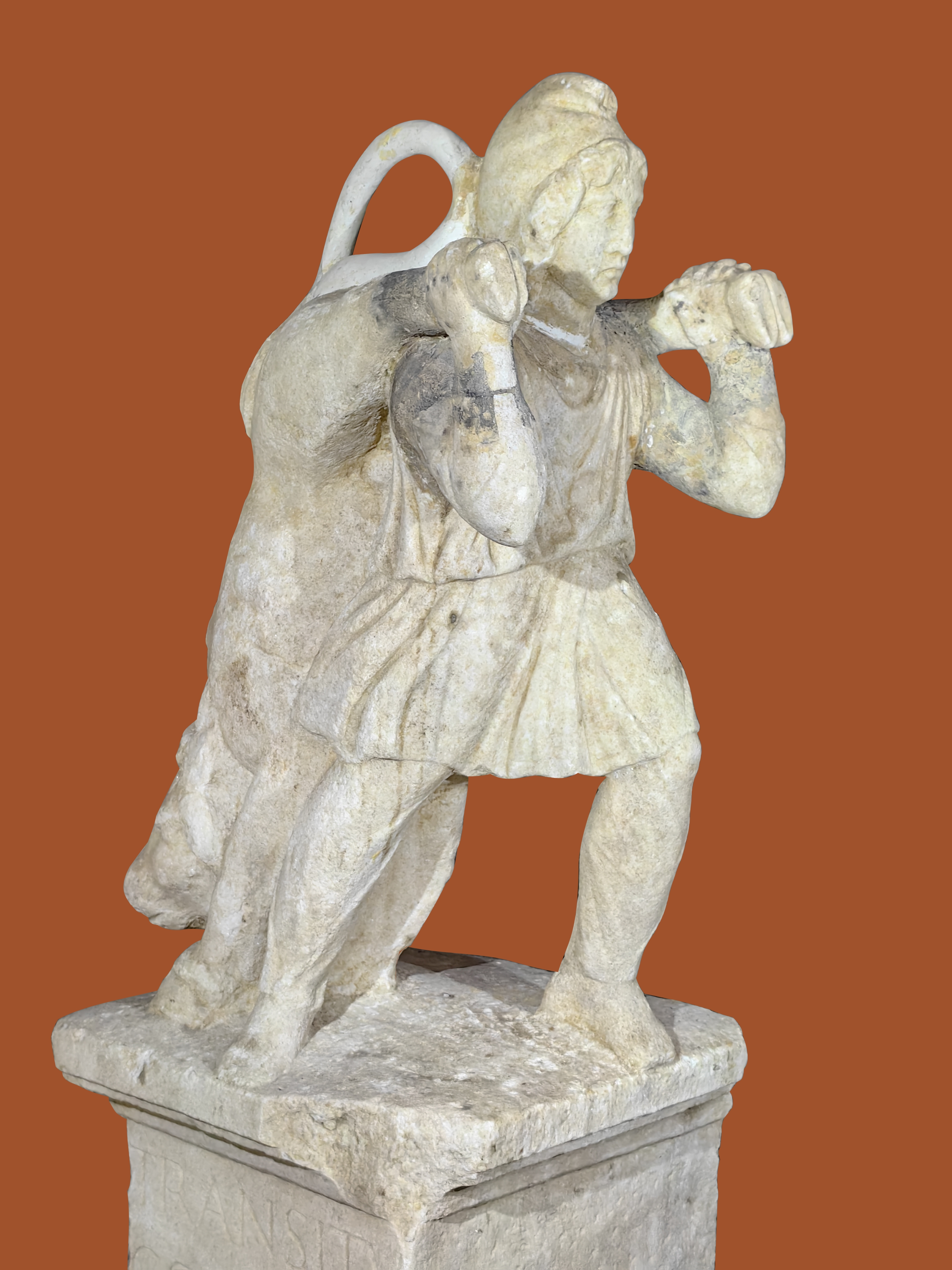
Mithras carrying the bull

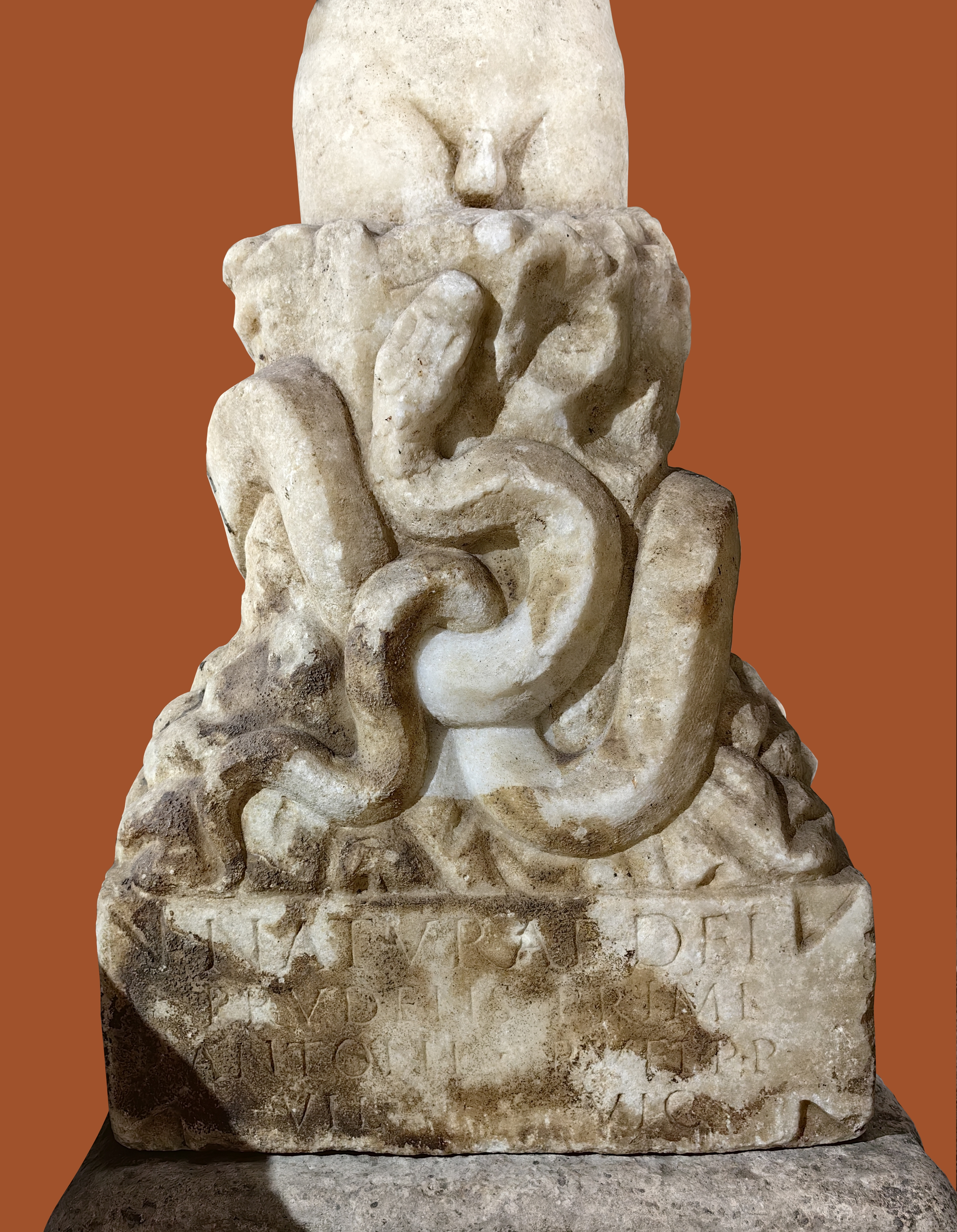
Birth of Mithras from a rock

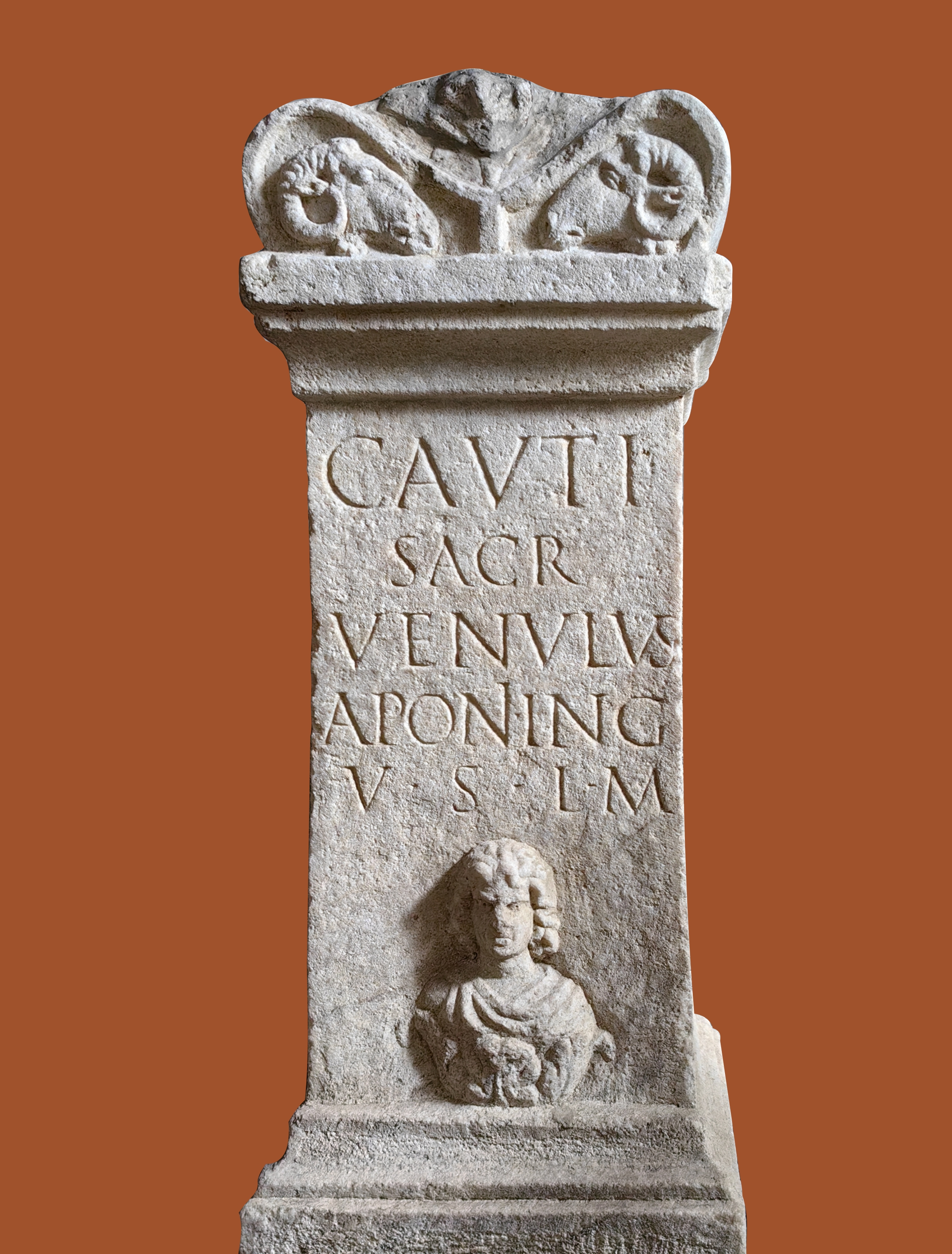
Altar dedicated to Cautes

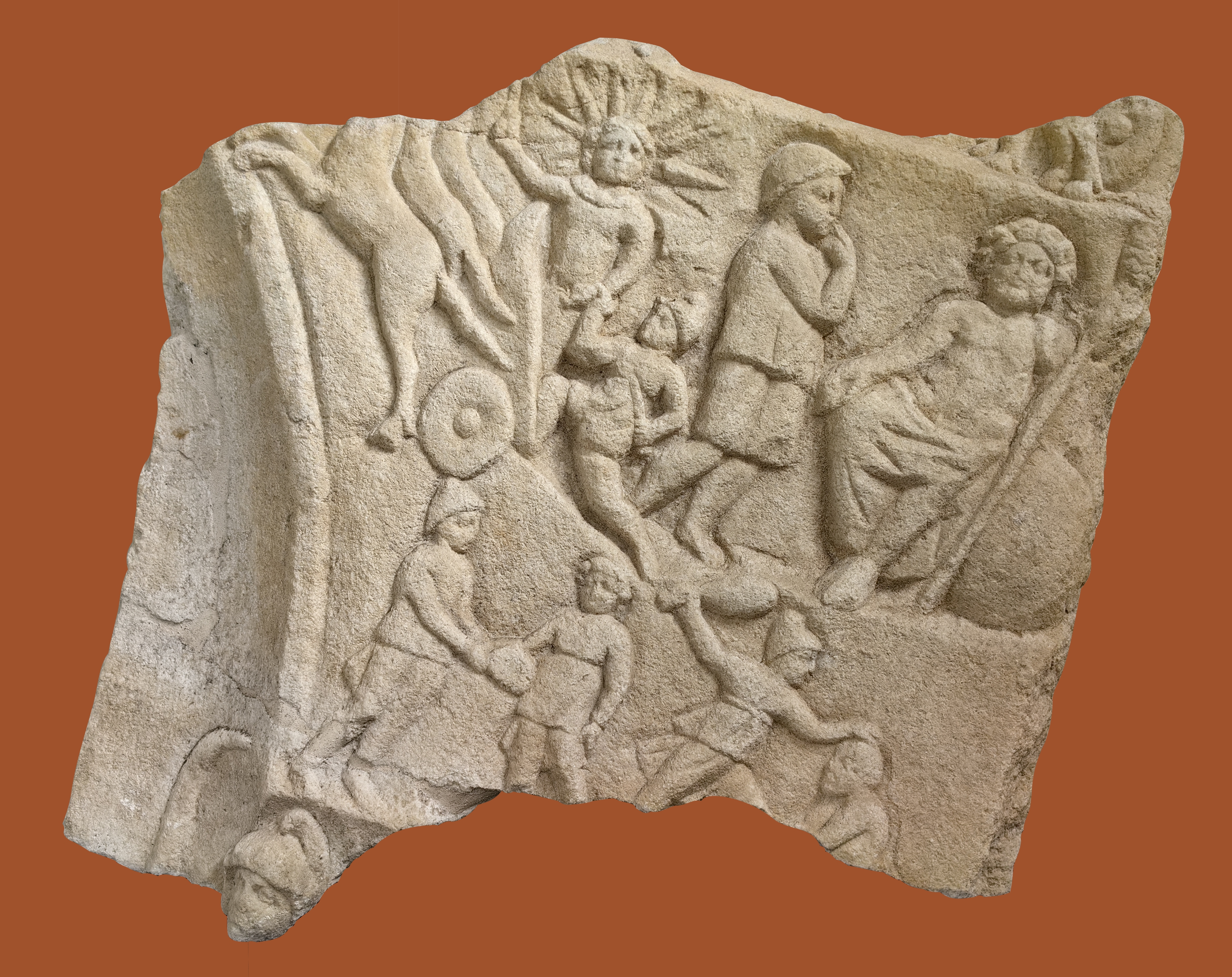
Main Mithras altar fragment

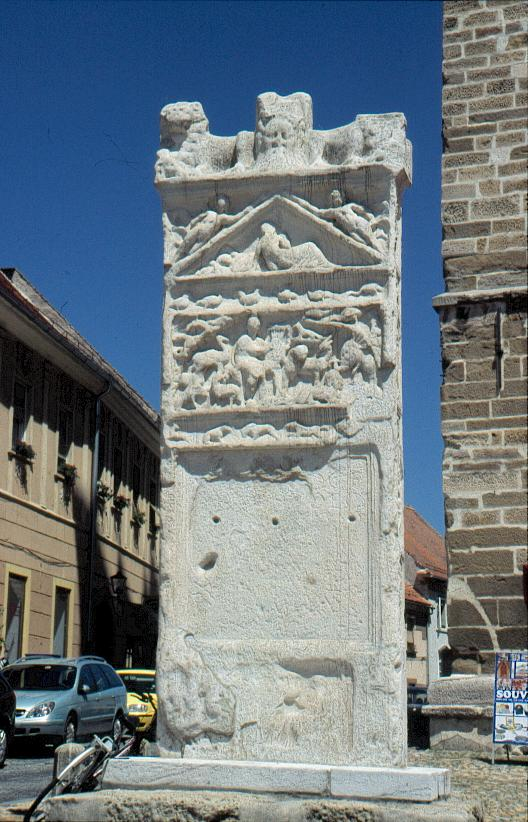
Orpheus monument

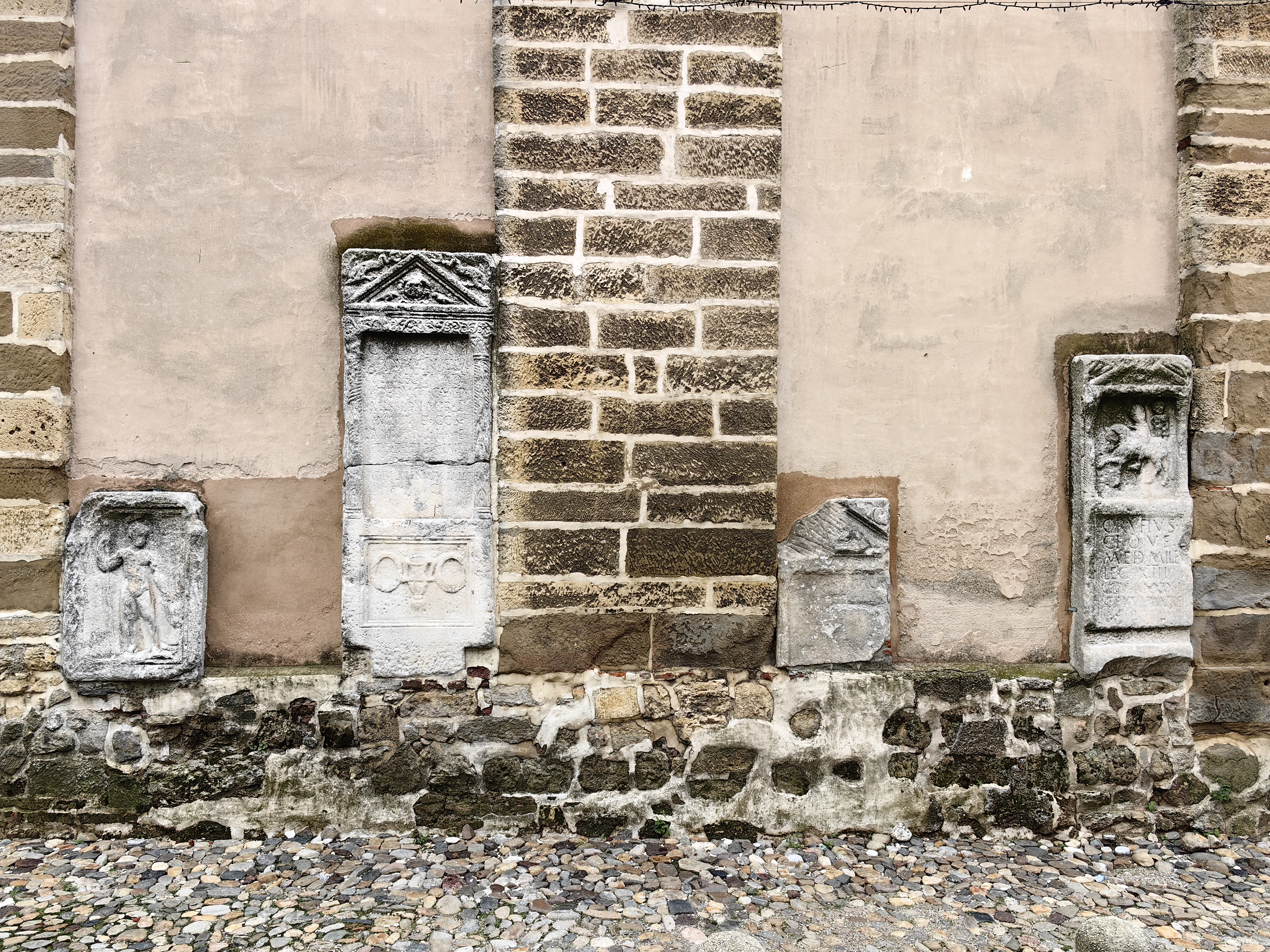
Steles in the Ptuj town tower

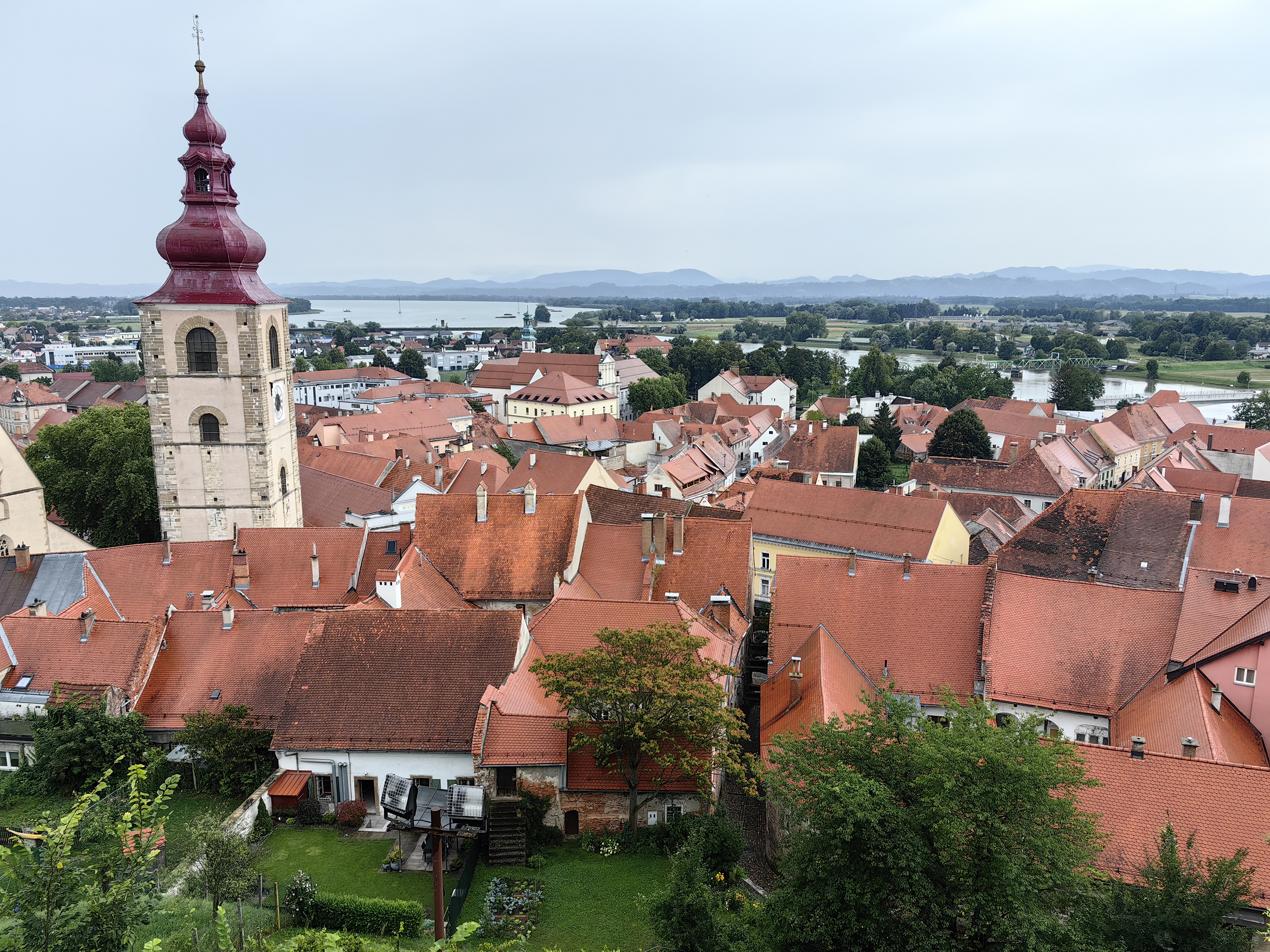
Ptuj old town

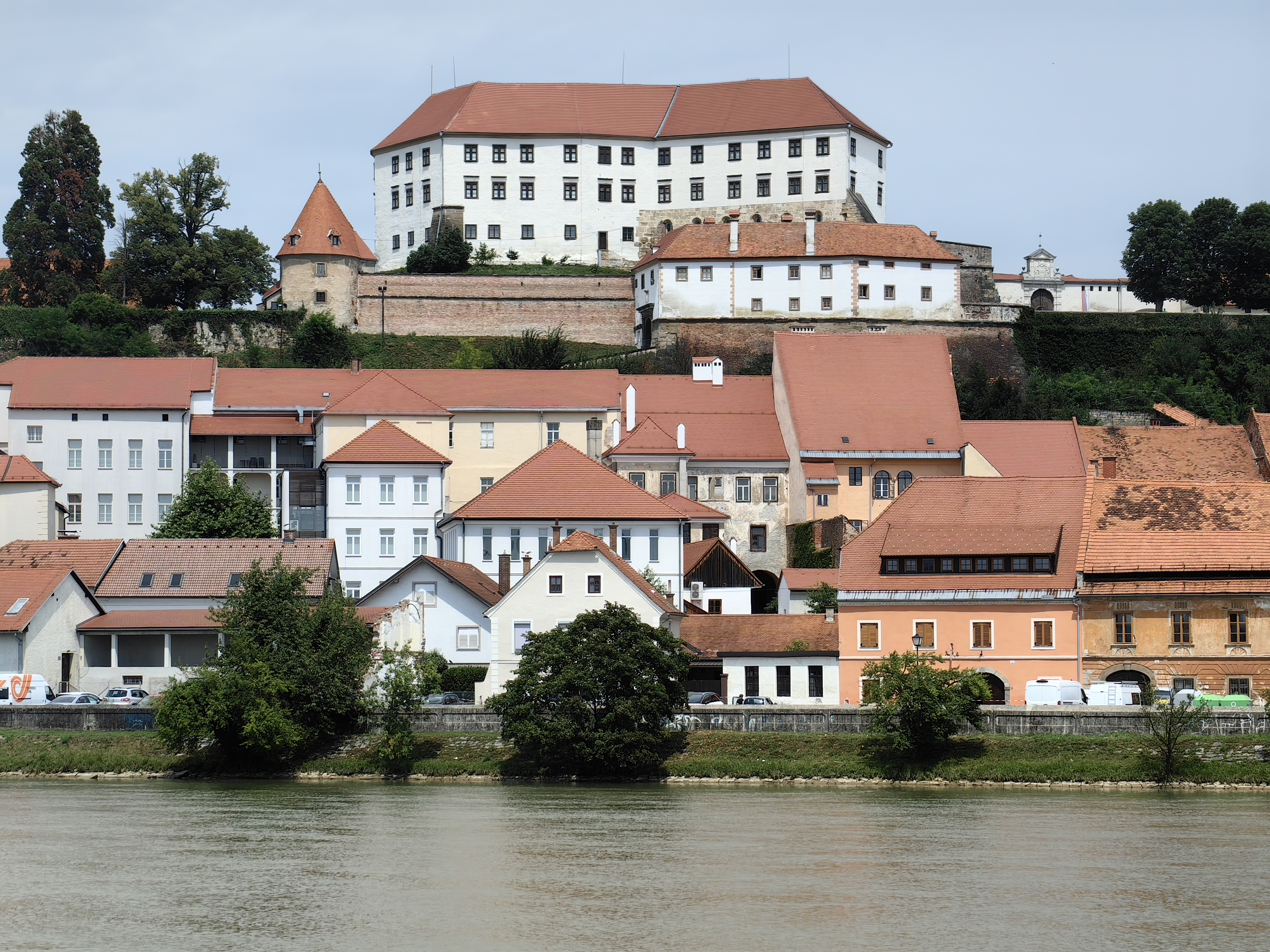
Ptuj Castle

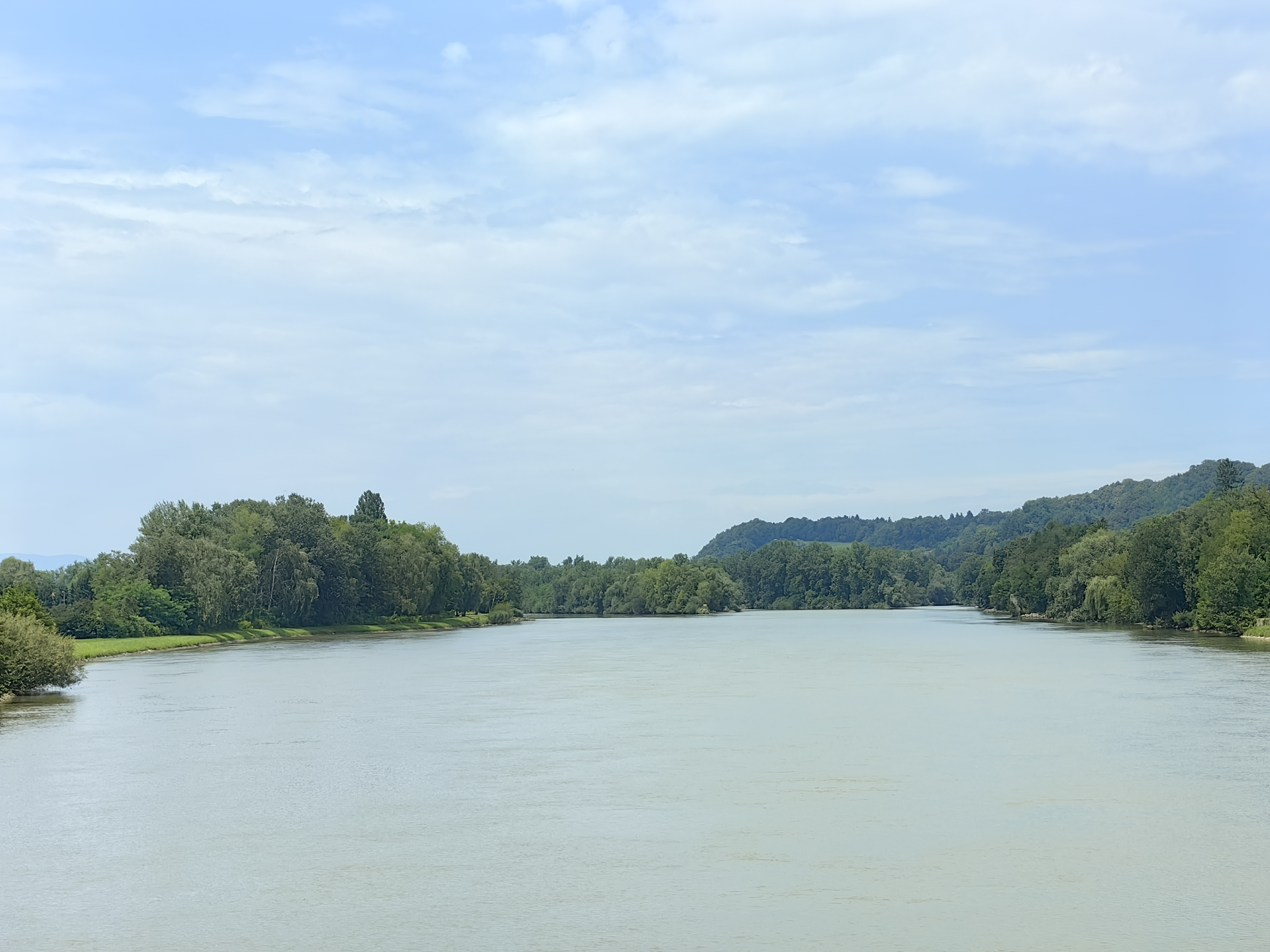
Drava river at Ptuj

== Life and work ==
Saria was born 5 June 1893 in Ptuj, Austria-Hungary, now Slovenia, the oldest Styrian town (Poetovio in Roman times), located on the important communication route between the Eastern Alpine countries and the Pannonian Basin on the one hand and the central Danube region and the northern Adriatic coast on the other hand. He was the youngest of the three children in a German-speaking bourgeois family. His father Alois Saria, born in Guštanj came to Ptuj in the 1870s as a pioneer sergeant. He married Maria Oblack (also spelled Marija Oblak) from Ptuj, left the army and took over her family's trading business.

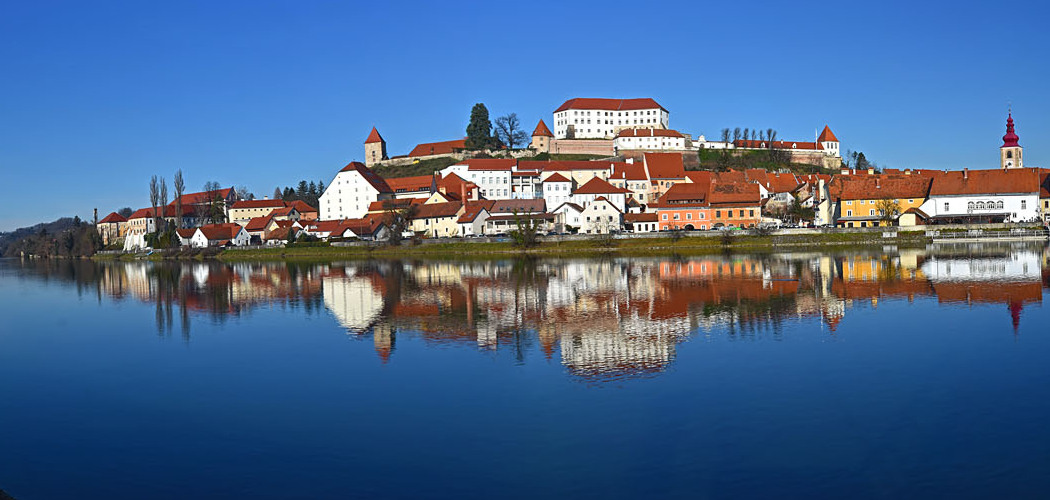
Ptuj above Drava river

Saria's interest in ancient history developed in his early youth. A Roman relief depicting Nutrices, female deities, the protectors of nursing mothers and motherhood, was built on the front of the house in which he was born. On the town tower, ancient epigraphic monuments could be read, and during Saria's youth, a number of important archaeological finds were discovered in the vicinity, which aroused great interest among the general public, including a cult site dedicated to the Persian deity Mithras. In the two decades from Saria's birth till the end of his high school in 1912, at least one major excavation or chance discovery took place every year in or near Ptuj.

During his high school years, Saria was a member of the Ptuj Museum Society (Musealverein Pettau). He intensively dealt with the history of the Roman period of Ptuj and with great vigor participated in archaeological excavations and conservation of finds from the ancient Poetovio (its full name was Colonia Ulpia Traiana Poetovio). With an estimated population of 17,000 people in Roman times it was the largest settlement not only in what is now Styria but also in Štajerska, its Slovenian part.

In 1912 Saria moved to Vienna to study ancient history, archaeology and classical philology at the Archaeological-Epigraphic Seminar of the Faculty of Arts. His teachers included the ancient historian and epigraphist Eugen Bormann, the ancient historian and numismatist Wilhelm Kubitschek, the archaeologist Emil Reisch and the philologist Edmund Hauler, later also the archaeologist Emanuel Löwy and the prehistorian Oswald Menghin. In 1914, when the First World War broke out, he was drafted into the Austro-Hungarian army, where he also experienced captivity as an Italian prisoner of war and the end of the war in the position of artillery first lieutenant. In 1919 he resumed his study in Vienna and as a promising student, he was soon included in the work of the Archaeological-Epigraphic Seminar. In the winter semester of 1919/20 he was a scholarship holder of the seminar and from the summer semester of 1920 he worked there as a librarian. In 1921 he completed the study with a doctorate, supervised by Emil Reisch. The dissertation title was On the development of the Mithraic cult image [Zur Entwicklung des mithrischen Kultbildes].

At that time he changed his religion from Catholic to Protestant, and also had to choose whether, as a German Styrian, he should pursue his career in Austria or return to Ptuj, which was now part of the newly established Kingdom of Serbs, Croats and Slovenians. Vienna was still one of the most important scientific centres and could offer Saria a good international career, but in the war-torn Austria, which had shrunk to an eighth of its pre-WWI size in terms of population and area, job opportunities were very limited. The financial situation in the old homeland was not much better, too, the level of scientific production was modest and there was a deep mistrust of the German-minded people, especially in Lower Styria and Carniola. However, in the new state there was a great shortage of trained and capable specialists in most scientific institutions, with great employment opportunities. This argument was probably decisive.

In August 1922, he attended an archaeological conference in Yugoslavia, in Dobrna near Celje. Vladimir Petković, the respected Serbian art historian and archaeologist, the new manager of the National Museum of Serbia in Belgrade wanted to reorganize the collections according to modern museum principles. Young scientist Saria fitted such a plan perfectly and after initial hurdles, Petković invited Saria in November to come to Belgrade.

From the end of 1922 to 1926 he worked at the National Museum, where he was soon entrusted with the management of the archaeological and numismatic department. During this time he also became an assistant, later an assistant professor in the Department of Ancient History at the Faculty of Arts, University of Belgrade. By participating in and later also leading excavations in Central Serbia and Southern Serbia, now Northern Macedonia (Viminacium, Scupi, Stobi) as well as studying available antiquities and the Serbian medieval numismatics, he acquired a thorough knowledge of the historical topography of these areas.

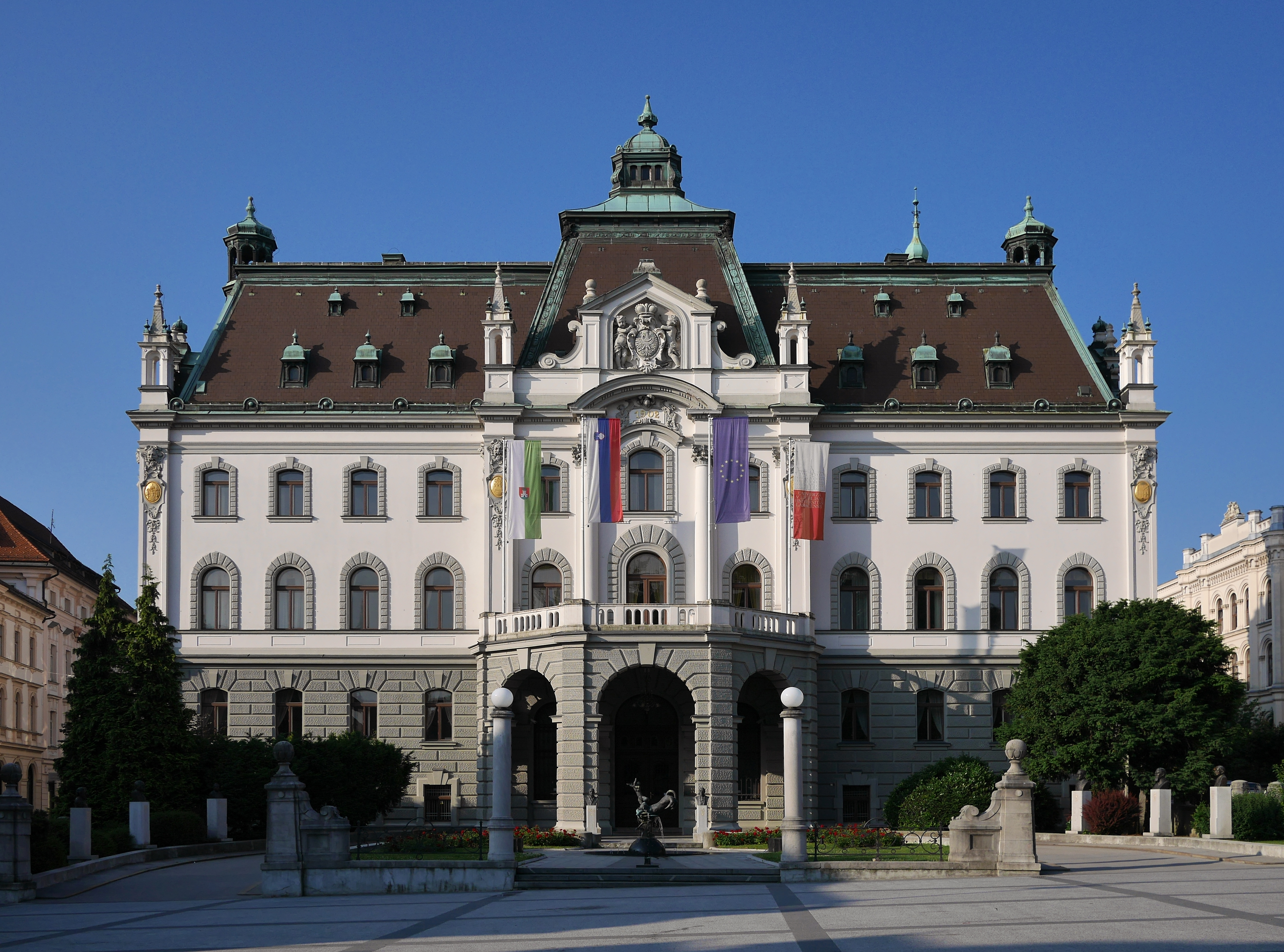
Saria's workplace from 1926 to 1942

His work was noticed at the University of Ljubljana, founded in 1919 and where archaeological curriculum was established in 1923. After the first contacts in October 1924 he was invited to come to Ljubljana in October 1925, for the versatility of his scientific work, his excellent knowledge of classical languages, his previous achievements and the need to surpass the Italians .... Upon the retirement of Nikolaj Bubnov (an emigrant from Kiev after the First World War) in the spring of 1926, he took over the position of the associate professor of ancient history and the chair for ancient history and epigraphy. He gradually became the central figure of Slovenian Roman studies. He developed epigraphy, ancient military history, archaeological cartography and surveying to top level of Central European archaeology. Important part of his teaching was the participation of students in the field work. During that time he led excavations at several sites in Slovenia, including the Late Roman fortress at Velike Malence and the Roman aqueduct for Neviodunum.

In 1937, he was promoted to the title of full professor and until 1942 he continuously participated in the education of Slovenian historians and classical philologists (who at that time still combined the study of philology with the study of ancient history and ancient archaeology). In 1938 he published, together with Viktor Hoffiller, the seminal work Antique inscriptions from Yugoslavia / Noricum and Pannonia Superior. As many copies of this book were lost during the WWII, it was republished in 1970.

Saria considered himself a German and ideologically joined National Socialism. After the Italian occupation of the central-southern part of Slovenia in 1941, the newly formed Province of Ljubljana was made up of less than a third of pre-WWII Slovenia with one fourth of its population. University of Ljubljana lost most of its hinterland, its future was questionable and Saria searched for a suitable position in the German Reich. He found it in the city nearest to his birthplace, which replaced Ptuj as the center of Styria after the defeat of Hungarian army with its allies in the Battle of Mohács, and in 1942 started to teach Roman antiquity and epigraphy at the University of Graz. Though he kept an apolitical attitude in his texts from the war period, Saria, for no apparent reason, applied for membership in the Nazi Party in June 1944 and was officially accepted in January 1945. This decision proved fatal for his academic career – immediately after the capitulation of Germany in 1945 he was forced into early retirement.

From 1947 onwards he wrote several articles on ancient and modern history, intellectual history, cultural policy, and questions of ethnicity in south-eastern Europe. After 1949 he led excavations in Austria, on behalf of the Austrian Archaeological Institute at the Austrian Academy of Sciences, in Sankt Pölten (Aelium Cetium), in Winden am See (Roman estate) and especially between the villages Bruckneudorf and Parndorf. Between 1949 and 1955 a villa complex with the palatial main building, a large number of outbuildings and surrounding walls was uncovered here. The floor mosaics in the main building, over 300 m^{2} in size are the largest such find in Austria. From 1953 to 1966, Saria was a freelance researcher at the Southeast Institute in Munich. Here his language abilities and diverse specialist knowledge, his familiarity with the historical and cultural circumstances in the South Slavic countries, his practical sense to deal with various agendas carefully and quickly were all put to good use.

== Personal life and death ==
In his Belgrade years Saria visited the village Nova Ševa (German Neu Schewa), now Ravno Selo in Bačka, 150 km to the northwest of Belgrade, where pre-WWII a large share of inhabitants were of German origin. He met a local girl, Jolanthe, maiden name Hartmann, born 1904, 11 years younger than him. In February 1928 they married in Nova Ševa. They lived in Ljubljana, before relocating first to Ptuj in the spring 1942 and to Graz in December 1943, and had two daughters, Reingard Jolanta (born 1931) and Gertruda Katarina (born 1935).

In 1970 Saria suffered a mild stroke, in 1971 he underwent a surgery. He recovered well and a month before his death he served as a guide on a day trip organized by the Historical Society of Styria. Saria died of heart failure in Graz June 3, 1974, two days before his 81st birthday. His last scientific work was in Slovenian, about his hometown: an "Overview of the Topography of Poetovio". It was published posthumously in Maribor, in the journal Časopis za zgodovino in narodopisje [Journal of History and Ethnography] together with his obituary.

== Legacy ==
Professor Saria's work was largely devoted to the study of antiquities in the South Slavic countries. He had a particularly thorough knowledge of the antiquity in Slovenia, and to address its issues, what was missed and needed, he was preparing an outline of the history of the classical antiquity for the eastern-Alpine region. However, both World War II and his personal decisions prevented him from completing this work. Nevertheless his opus, not only articles in scientific journals but also selectively written lexical-analytic reviews for the Practical encyclopedia of classical antiquity and entries in many other lexicons will continue to inform the world about the state of ancient Roman studies for places such as Nauportus, Neviodunum, Ocra pass below the Nanos plateau, Poetovio, Stobi, Ulpianum or Viminacium.

== Selected publications ==
- Ceramiae-Deuriopos, Mitteilungen des Vereins klassischer Philologen 2 (1925) p. 34–38, 102–103
- Vor- und frühgeschichtliche Forschung in Südslawien [Prehistoric and early historical research in South Slavia], Bericht der Römisch-Germanischen Kommission 16 (1926) p. 86–118
- Bathinus flumen [Bosnia River], Mélanges F. Šišić (1929) p. 137–142 (also see Klio 23 [1929] p. 92–97 and Klio 26 [1933] p. 279–282)
- Zur Geschichte des Kaisers Regalianus [On the history of Emperor Regalianus], Klio 30 (1937) p. 352–354
- Pozorište u Stobima [Theater in Stobi], Godišnjak muzeja Južne Srbije 1 (1937) p. 1–68 (also see Archäologischer Anzeiger 1938, p. 81–148)
- Der spätantike Limes im westlichen Jugoslawien [The Late Antique Limes in Western Yugoslavia], Studi Bizantini e neoellenici 5 (1938) p. 308–316
- Die Inschriften des Theaters von Stobi [The inscriptions of the Stobi theater], ÖJh Beiblatt 32 (1940) p. 5–34
- Noricum und Pannonien (ein Forschungsbericht) [Noricum and Pannonia (a research report)], Historia 1 (1950) p. 436–486
- Der römische Gutshof von Winden am See [The Roman estate of Winden am See], Burgenländische Forschungen 13, 1951, p. 16–22
- Die geographischen Kenntnisse der Griechen und Römer vom Ostalpengebiet [The geographical knowledge of the Greeks and Romans of the Eastern Alps], Ostdeutsche Wissenschaft 4 (1958) p. 89–98
- Der römische Herrensitz bei Parndorf und seine Deutung [The Roman manor house near Parndorf and its interpretation], Wissenschaftliche Arbeiten aus dem Burgenland 35 (1966) p. 252–271
- Die antike Stadt in Südosteuropa [The ancient city in southeastern Europe], Südosteuropa-Jahrbuch 8 (1968) p. 11–22

== Bibliography ==
The following optional lists: Self-standing publications, Articles in journals and newspapers, Articles in collective works, bring Saria's (almost) entire opus, as documented in the three bibliograhic articles (all are freely accessible online), published in German in 1963, 1968 and 1973. For various reasons his articles in the monthly/semimonthly magazine "Reč i slika" (Word and Image, Belgrade, January 1926 – April 1927], in the weekly "Werbaßer Zeitung" (Vrbas Gazette, Novi Vrbas, 1902–1941), and his reviews in the following journals: Byzantinisch-neugriechische Jahrbücher, Jahrbuch für die Geschichte Mittel- und Ostdeutschlands, Bibliotheca Orientalis, Mitteilungen der Südosteuropa-Gesellschaft were not included in the three abovementioned sources.

The entries in the lists are numbered and chronologically ordered, publication years are emphasized in the first appearance. For clarity, to avoid overlong entries and for easier perception of the subjects covered in the works of Saria only English translations of the publication titles are given. As he published mainly in his native tongue, the publication language is shown after the title only when it was different from German.

A – 10 Self-standing publications
1. Archaeological map of Yugoslavia: Ptuj sheet. Belgrade, Zagreb 1936, VIII + 99 p., 4 illus., 1 table and 2 folding maps in the appendix (with Josip Klemenc).
2. Ancient inscriptions from Yugoslavia. Volume I: Noricum and Pannonia Superior. Zagreb 1938, VIII + 279 p. (with Viktor Hoffiller).
3. Archaeological map of Yugoslavia: Rogatec sheet. Belgrade, Zagreb 1939 (issued in 1941), VI + 86 p., 1 folding map, 4 illus. in tables.
4. Ptuj. A guide to the town and its history. 1st ed. Ptuj 1941, 44 p., 29 illus., 1 town map, 2nd improved ed. 1943, 3rd ed. 1944.
5. Prehistory and early history of the Wildon district. The Roman period in central Styria. Graz 1947, 20 p. (hectographed).
6. The Roman estate of Winden am See. Burgenländische Forschungen Vol. 13. Eisenstadt 1951, 69 p., 24 illus., 55 Fig. and 8 appendices.
7. History of the Southeast German ethnic groups. Der Göttinger Arbeitskreis, Schriftenreihe Nr. 42. Würzburg 1954, 36 p., 1 map.
8. What can Primož Trubar say to us today? Südostdeutsches Kulturwerk, Kleine Südostreihe, Issue 4. München 1963, 42 p., 1 illus.
9. Mirko Rupel: Primož Trubar. Life and work of the Slovenian reformer. Translated and edited by Balduin Saria. Südosteuropa-Verlagsgesellschaft, Munich 1965. VIII + 314 p., 1 illus. in text, 15 tables, 1 map.
10. Ptuj. Origin and development of a settlement in the German-Slovenian border region. Hommage to Hans Pirchegger. Historische Verein für Steiermark, Graz 1965. 62 p., 14 illus. and maps in text, 4 tables.

B – 281 Articles in journals and newspapers
1. Archaeological finds from Poetovio. Blätter zur Geschichte und Heimatkunde der Alpenländer, 1914, Vol. IV, pp. 422–427
2. On the history of the province of Dacia. Štrena Buliciana, Zagreb, 1921, pp. 249–252
3. Archaeological research in the area of old Poetovio. (in Serbian) Starinar, Belgrade, 1922, 3rd series, Ist book, pp. 191–208
4. A contribution to the history of Turkish and Hungarian attacks. (in Slovenian) Časopis za zgodovino in narodopisje, Maribor, 1922, Vol. XVII, pp. 39–40
5. From the Ptuj cemetery. Cillier Zeitung, Celje, 1922, 17 December
6. From an old vineyard. Cillier Zeitung, Celje, 1923, 10 April
7. About Ptuj (Part II of the Schickelgruber manuscript). Cillier Zeitung, Celje, 1923, 29 April
8. Tutankhamun. Cillier Zeitung, Celje, 1923, 5 August
9. The exploration of Poetovio. To celebrate the 30th anniversary of the Ptuj Museum Association. Cillier Zeitung, Celje, 1923, 2 September
10. The development of Mithra's cult image in the Danube regions. (in Serbian) Starinar, Belgrade, 1923, 3rd series, IInd book, pp. 33–62
11. From the numismatic collection of the National Museum in Belgrade, Part I. (in Serbian) Starinar, Belgrade, 1924/25, 3rd series, IIIrd book, pp. 61–99
12. Archaeological research in Southern Serbia. (in Serbian) Starinar, Belgrade, 1924/25, 3rd series, IIIrd book, pp. 101–114
13. Archaeological notes. (in Serbian) Starinar, Belgrade, 1924/25, 3rd series, IIIrd book, pp. 159–164
14. On the ruins of Stobi. Cillier Zeitung, Celje, 1924, 13 July
15. Saint Naum. Cillier Zeitung, Celje, 1924, 12 October
16. From the Belgrade National Museum: 1. A find of Roman antoniniana from Serbia. 2. A new aureus of Vetranio. Numismatische Zeitschrift, Wien 1924, Vol. 57, pp. 90–96
17. The National Museum in 1923: Report on the Prehistoric, Roman and Numismatic Department. (in Serbian) Godišnjak Srpske Kraljevske Akademije Nauka, 1924, Vol. XXXII
18. Excavations in Stobi. (in Serbian) Glasnik Skopskog Naučnog Društva, 1925, Vol. I., pp. 287–300
19. Map of archaeological sites in Slovenia. (in Slovenian) Časopis za zgodovino in narodopisje, Maribor, 1925, Vol. XX, pp. 72–80
20. Ceramiae — Deuriopos. Mitteilungen d. Vereins klassischer Philologen, Wien 1925, Vol. II, pp. 34–39
21. A new Reiner key. Mitteilungen d. Numismatischen Gesellschaft, Wien 1925, Vol. XV, p. 285
22. A Friesach find from Dobrica in Banat. Mitteilungen d. Numismatischen Gesellschaft, Wien 1925, Vol. XV, p. 303 f. and 323 f.
23. Roman graves in Orešje near Ptuj. (in Slovenian) Časopis za zgodovino in narodopisje, Maribor, 1925, Vol. XX, p. 95
24. Call for reports on found antiquities. (in Slovenian) Časopis za zgodovino in narodopisje, Maribor, 1925, Vol. XX, pp. 112
25. The theater ruins of Stobi. Belgrader Zeitung, 1925, No. 250, 26 July
26. The National Museum in 1924: Report on the Prehistoric, Roman and Numismatic Department. (in Serbian) Godišnjak Srpske Kraljevske Akademije Nauka, 1925, Vol. XXXIII
27. From old Poetovio. Cillier Zeitung, Celje, 1926, 7 January
28. Newer archaeological literature with special reference to Slovenian regions. (in Slovenian) Glasnik Muzejskega društva za Slovenijo, Ljubljana, 1926/27, Vol. V1I/VIII, pp. 65–70
29. From the numismatic collection of the National Museum in Belgrade, part II. (in Serbian) Starinar, Belgrade, 1926/27, 3rd series, IVth book, pp. 83–91
30. The beginnings of the Christian community in Belgrade. Nachrichten d. Belgrader evangelischen Gemeinde, 1926, Vol. III, p. 37—41
31. (Epigraphic supplement) to CIL III 7320. Mitteilungen d. Vereins klassischer Philologen, Wien 1926, Vol. III, pp. 7–9
32. Antiquities from Durrës. Jahreshefte d. österreichischen archäologischen Instituts, 1926, Vol. XXIII, Beibl. pp. 241–246
33. Prehistoric and early historical research in Southslavia. XVI. Bericht d. Römisch-Germanischen Kommission, 1926, pp. 86–118
34. The National Museum in 1925: Report on the Prehistoric, Roman and Numismatic Department. (in Serbian) Godišnjak Srpske Kraljevske Akademije Nauka, 1926, Vol. XXXIV
35. From the beginnings of Christian life in Yugoslavia. Protestantenkalender, Neu-Werbas 1927, pp. 87–91
36. Interesting archaeological finds. (in French) Revue continentale, Budapest 1927, January–February, p. 16
37. Archaeological excavations in Stobi (Macedonia). Cillier Zeitung, Celje, 1927, 30 October
38. Prehistoric gold jewelry from Southern Serbia. (in Serbian) Glasnik Skopskog Naučnog Društva, 1927, Vol. II, pp. 289–290
39. On the development of the Mithraic cult image. Mitteilungen d. Vereins klassischer Philologen, Wien 1927, Vol. IV, pp. 53–59
40. Yugoslavia in antiquity. Kraljevina Srba, Hrvata i Slovenaca, JNU (Journalists' Association of Yugoslavia), 1927, pp. 34–49
41. Numismatic report from Yugoslavia. Numismatische Zeitschrift, Wien 1927, Vol. 60, pp. 10–19
42. The National Museum in 1926: Report on the Prehistoric, Roman and Numismatic Departments. (in Serbian) Godišnjak Srpske Kraljevske Akademije Nauka, 1927, Vol. XXXV
43. Brooches with locking devices. Vjesnik Hrvatskog Arheološkog Društva, Zagreb, 1928, New series, Vol. XV, pp. 73–80
44. New inscriptions from Gradišče near Velike Malence. (in Serbian) Starinar, Belgrade, 1928—30, 3rd series, 5. Buch, pp. 65–69
45. On the opening of the new Ptuj Museum. Cillier Zeitung, Celje, 1928, 4. November
46. Investigations in Stobi I: Topography and history. (in Serbian) Glasnik Skopskog Naučnog Društva, 1929, Vol. V, pp. 1–13
47. Epigraphic monuments from Southern Serbia. (in Serbian) Glasnik Skopskog Naučnog Društva, 1929/30, Vol. VII/VIII, pp. 293–302
48. Barbarian figurines from Kostolac (Viminacium). Germania, 1929, Vol. XIII, pp. 26–30
49. Prehistoric and early historical fortifications at the mouth of the Krka. Deutsches Volksblatt, Novi Sad, 15 December 1929, p. 2
50. Bathinus flumen. (in Serbian) Šišićev Zbornik [Melanges Šišić], 1929, pp. 137–141
51. Bathinus flumen. Klio, 1929, Vol. XXIII, pp. 92–97
52. New inscriptions from Praetorium Latobicorum. Mitteilungen d. Vereins klassischer Philologen, Wien 1929, Vol. VI, pp. 85–88
53. Provisional report on the excavations at Gradišče near Velike Malence. (in Slovenian) Glasnik Muzejskega društva za Slovenijo, Ljubljana, 1929, Vol. X, pp. 11–17
54. A battle for faith and homeland. On the history of the Reformation and Counter-Reformation in Ptuj (Pettau). Weihnachtsgruß an die Evangelischen in Slowenien und ihre Freunde, 1929, December
55. The beginnings of old Serbian coinage. Deuxième congrès international des Études byzantines, Belgrade 1927. Beograd 1929, p. 187 f.
56. A battle for faith and homeland. On the history of the Reformation and Counter-Reformation in Ptuj. Neues Leben, 1930, 1 January
57. Archaeological research in Yugoslavia. Slawische Rundschau, 1930, Vol. II, pp. 8–12, 189—194
58. A Dionysus votive from the consulate year of P. Dasumius Rusticus. Jahreshefte d. österreichischen archäologischen Instituts, 1930, Vol. XXVI,S. 64—74
59. Second provisional report on the excavations at Gradišče near Velike Malence. (in Slovenian) Glasnik Muzejskega društva za Slovenijo, Ljubljana, 1930, Vol. XI, pp. 5–12
60. Slovenia in the antiquity. (in Slovenian) Glasnik Jugoslovenskog profesorskog Društva, 1931, pp. 506–518
61. About the weight of the oldest Dubrovnik dinar coins. (in Serbian) Rešetarov Zbornik (Jubilee publication for Rešetar), 1931, pp. 39–41
62. Emona expats' union in Savaria. (in Slovenian) Glasnik Muzejskega društva za Slovenijo, Ljubljana, 1931, Vol. XII, pp. 5–15
63. Roman aqueduct from Neviodunum (interim report). (in Slovenian) Glasnik Muzejskega društva za Slovenijo, Ljubljana, 1931, Vol. XII, p. 50
64. Numismatics. Guide to the collections of the National Museum of Slovenia. (in Slovenian) Narodni muzej, Ljubljana, 1931, pp. 80–92
65. The Reformation among the South Slavs. Festbuch der Evangelischen Kirchengemeinde A. B. in Zagreb zur Amtseinführung ihres Pfarrers Dr. Philipp Popp zum Bischof der Deutschen Evangelisch-christlichen Kirche A. B. im Königreich Jugoslawien, Zagreb, 1931, pp. 9–12
66. Archaeological maps. (in Slovenian) Glasnik Muzejskega društva za Slovenijo, Ljubljana, 1932, Vol. XII, pp. 5–16. Davon ein Auszug in: Prähistorische Zeitschrift, 1931, Vol. XXII, p. 227 f.
67. Easter in the old church. Neues Leben, 1932, Vol. XII, No. 4, 25 March, p. 31 f.
68. The discovery of Roman bronze coins in Igriška Street in Ljubljana. (in Slovenian) Glasnik Muzejskega društva za Slovenijo, Ljubljana, 1932, Vol. XIII, pp. 17–20
69. New finds in the episcopal church in Stobi. (in Serbian) Glasnik Skopskog Naučnog Društva, 1932, Vol. XII, pp. 11–32
70. New finds in the bishop's church of Stobi. Actes du IIIme Congrès International d'Études Byzantines (Session d'Athènes, octobre 1930), Athens 1932, p. 213
71. New inscriptions from Carniola. (in Slovenian) Glasnik Muzejskega društva za Slovenijo, Ljubljana, 1933, Vol. XIV, pp. 5–27
72. Ljubljanica as mentioned by Strabo. (in Slovenian) Glasnik Muzejskega društva za Slovenijo, Ljubljana, 1933, Vol. XIV, pp. 140–141
73. New explorations in the old Poetovia. (in Slovenian) Časopis za zgodovino in narodopisje, Maribor, 1933, Vol. XXVIII, pp. 119–129
74. New finds in the bishop's church of Stobi. Jahreshefte d. österreichischen archäologischen Instituts, 1933, Vol. XXVIII,S. 112—139
75. A Roman figural capital from Stobi. (in Serbian) Starinar, Belgrade, 1933/34, 3rd series, 8th/9th book, pp. 8–13
76. A tombstone from Viminacium. (in Serbian) Starinar, Belgrade, 1933/34, 3rd series, 8th/9th book, pp. 73–83
77. The main cult images of the Mithras in Poetovio. (in Slovenian) Zbornik za umetnostno zgodovino, 1933, Vol. XII, pp. 63–86
78. Bathinus — Bosnia river. Klio, 1933, Vol. XXVI, pp. 279–282
79. Ethnographic material from Simon Povoden's work "Bürgerliches Lesebuch". (in Slovenian) Etnolog, 1933, Vol. VI, pp. 254–258
80. Germanic remains in present-day Yugoslavia. Volkswart, 1933, Vol. I, pp. 28–33
81. The West Celtic coins of the gold stater of Philip II of Macedonia. Germania, 1934, Vol. XVIII, pp. 49–50
82. The Finds from Vače. The Mecklenburg Collection Treasures of Carniola, New York 1934, pp. 63–65 and 120—123
83. The sixth scientific journey of German and Danube region archaeologists. (in Serbian) Jugoslovenski Istoriski Časopis, 1935, Vol. I, pp. 734–740
84. Field work of the archaeological seminar of the King Alexander I University in Ljubljana. (in Serbian) Jugoslovenski Istoriski Časopis, 1935, Vol. I, pp. 744–746
85. Positive models of Roman oil lamps from Poetovio. Germania, 1935, Vol. XIX, pp. 27–32
86. An Emonian regional association in Savaria. Pannonia, 1935, Vol. I, pp. 171–179
87. An inscription stone dedicated to Saxan from Šmartno na Pohorju. (in Slovenian) Časopis za zgodovino in narodopisje, Maribor, 1935, Vol. XXX, pp. 62–65.463
88. The fate of a Roman soldier from Celje. (in Slovenian) Časopis za zgodovino in narodopisje, Maribor, 1935, Vol. XXX, pp. 65–67
89. Anton R. von Premerstein. Glasnik Muzejskega društva za Slovenijo, Ljubljana, 1935, Vol. XVI, pp. 84–85
90. Numismatic acquisitions of the National Museum. (in Slovenian) Glasnik Muzejskega društva za Slovenijo, Ljubljana, 1935, Vol. XVI, pp. 88–89
91. New inscriptions from Carniola: 1st supplement. (in Slovenian) Glasnik Muzejskega društva za Slovenijo, Ljubljana, 1935, Vol. XVI, pp. 124–127
92. Archaeological map of Yugoslavia: Ptuj sheet. Beograd-Zagreb, 1936 (with J. Klemenc)
93. Trubar's Catechism. (in Slovenian) Duševni list, 1936, 20 April
94. Traces of antiquity in Slovenia. (in Slovenian) Jugoslovenski Istoriski Časopis, 1936, Vol. II, p. 451
95. On the history of Emperor Regalianus. Klio, 1937, Vol. XXX, pp. 352–354
96. Monuments of Egyptian deities in Poetovio. (in Slovenian) Časopis za zgodovino in narodopisje, Maribor, 1937, Vol. XXXII, pp. 20–28
97. Theater in Stobi. (in Serbian) Godišnjak Muzeja Južne Srbije, 1937, Vol. I, pp. 1–68 (only issued in special editions)
98. Ulaka — Metulum?. (in Slovenian) Glasnik Muzejskega društva za Slovenijo, Ljubljana, 1937, Vol. XVIII, pp. 59–60
99. New captions. (in Slovenian) Glasnik Muzejskega društva za Slovenijo, Ljubljana, 1937, Vol. XVIII, pp. 132–135
100. Excavations of the archaeological seminar of the King Alexander I University in Ljubljana. (in Slovenian) Jugoslovenski Istoriski Časopis, 1938, Vol. IV, pp. 192–194
101. Viktor Skrabar †. (in Slovenian) Glasnik Muzejskega društva za Slovenijo, Ljubljana, 1938, Vol. XIX, p. 158
102. The medieval defense (speech) from Stična and its parallels. (in Slovenian) Etnolog, 1938, Vol. X/XI, pp. 245–253
103. Emona as a base camp of the Legio XV Apollinaris. Laureae Aquincenses, Diss. Pann. 1938, 2. Serie, No. 10, pp. 243–253
104. The late antique Limes in western Yugoslavia. Studi Bizantini e Neoellenici, 1938, Vol. V, pp. 308–316
105. The theater of Stobi. Archäologischer Anzeiger, 1938, pp. 81–148
106. Emonian traders in Savaria. (in Slovenian) Kronika slovenskih mest, 1938, Vol. V, pp. 22–26
107. Ancient inscriptions from Yugoslavia. Volume I: Noricum and Pannonia Superior. Zagreb 1938 (with V. Hoffiller)
108. Byzantine lead seal from Caričin Grad. (in Serbian) Starinar, Belgrade, 1939, 3rd series, XIVth book, pp. 3–6
109. Contributions to the military history of Slovenian places in the Roman era. (in Slovenian) Glasnik Muzejskega društva za Slovenijo, Ljubljana, 1939, Vol. XX, pp. 115–151
110. Military tomb inscription from Emona. (in Slovenian) Kronika slovenskih mest, 1939, Vol. VI, pp. 46–48
111. Roman inscriptions in Maribor. (in Slovenian) Kronika slovenskih mest, 1939, Vol. VI, pp. 73–79
112. At the founding of the "Museum Association for the Districts of Krško and Brežice" in Krško. (in Slovenian) Kronika slovenskih mest, 1939, Vol. VI, pp. 241–242
113. Roman aqueduct of Neviodunum. Serta Hoffilleriana [Vjesnik Hrvatskog Arheološkog Društva], 1940, pp. 249–256
114. Bežigrad in antiquity. (in Slovenian) Naš Bežigrad, Ljubljana 1940, pp. 19–25
115. The inscriptions of the theater of Stobi. Wiener Jahreshefte, 1940, Vol. XXXII, Bbl. 5—34.465
116. New inscriptions from Carniola. (in Slovenian) Glasnik Muzejskega društva za Slovenijo, Ljubljana, 1941, Vol. XXII, pp. 36–43
117. Emona was not a military camp?. (in Slovenian) Glasnik Muzejskega društva za Slovenijo, Ljubljana, 1941, Vol. XXII, pp. 55–57
118. Roman tombstone at Ljubljana Castle. (in Slovenian) Glasnik Muzejskega društva za Slovenijo, Ljubljana, 1941, Vol. XXII, p. 133
119. Saxanus Augustus. (in Spanish) Corona de estudios, Madrid 1941, Vol. I, pp. 327–334
120. Archaeological map of Yugoslavia: Rogatec sheet. Beograd-Zagreb 1939 (issued in 1941)
121. Ptuj. A guide to the city and its history. 1st edition, Ptuj 1941, 44 p. 29 illus., 1 city map, 2nd improved edition 1943, 3rd edition 1944
122. The "Negova helmets". Marburger Zeitung, Maribor 1941, No. 124, 3 June and Tagespost, 1941, No. 161, 12 June
123. Ptuj in the early Middle Ages. Marburger Zeitung, Maribor, 1941, No. 216, 1 September 1941
124. The Michael Chapel at the town parish church in Ptuj. Marburger Zeitung, Maribor, 1941, No. 240, 25 September
125. The story of a garrison that "never marches". Marburger Zeitung, Maribor, 1942, No. 73/74, 14/15 March
126. Of old streets and squares in Ptuj. Marburger Zeitung, Maribor, 1942, No. 115/116, 25 April
127. From the Ptuj citizens' book. Marburger Zeitung, Maribor, 1942, No. 253, 10 September
128. Ptuj — gatekeeper in the southeast. Tagespost Graz, 1942, 13 September
129. Vurberk in the Turkish era. What a detailed castle inventory from 1525 tells us. Marburger Zeitung, Maribor, 1942, 28./29. November
130. A trip through Lower Styria in 1497. Marburger Zeitung, Maribor, 1942, 24.—27 December
131. The "Negova helmets". Marburger Zeitung, Maribor, 1942, No. 365, 31 December
132. The discovery site of the so-called Negova helmets. Germania, 1942, Vol. 26, pp. 55–56
133. Status and tasks of prehistoric and early history research in Upper Carniola. Carinthia, Vol. I, 1942, pp. 91–104
134. The Ženjak (Harigast) helmet and its inscription. Marburger Zeitung, Maribor, 1942/43, 31 December/1 January
135. Old Slavic or Germanic?. Marburger Zeitung, Maribor, 1943, 22 January
136. Ptuj and the Turkish threat of 1664. Marburger Zeitung, Maribor, 1943, 10. und 11 April
137. The breaking of the Marcomanni into Lower Styria. Marburger Zeitung, Maribor, 1943, 24./25./26 April
138. Fire outbreaks in old Ptuj. Marburger Zeitung, Maribor, 1943, 12./13./14 June
139. Ptuj and its town charter. Marburger Zeitung, Maribor, 1943, No. 226/227, 14./15 August
140. From prehistory and early history (of the district and town Brežice). Marburger Zeitung, Maribor, 1943, 17./18 October
141. Bakery in Ptuj. Marburger Zeitung, Maribor, 1943, 27./28. November
142. Royal visits to Ptuj. The town as a cornerstone of national defense. Marburger Zeitung, Maribor, 1943, No. 358/360, 24.—26 December
143. From the history of the castle [of Vurberk]. Wurmberg, Maribor 1943, pp. 12–17
144. Ptuj — the town of a thousand monuments. On the paths of historical research — The Municipal Museum. Marburger Zeitung, Maribor, 1943/44, 31 December/2 January
145. The wedding of Maid Cordula. From the book of a Ptuj shoemaker. Marburger Zeitung, Maribor, 1944, 25/26 March
146. Spring trip through the Dravinja valley. From a Latin travel diary, 1487. Marburger Zeitung, Maribor, 1944, 8./9./10 April
147. Land on the route of peoples. Lower Styria as reflected in Germanic history. Marburger Zeitung, Maribor, 1944, 15./16 April und Steirerland, 1944, 6 July
148. The leaning tower of Ptuj. Marburger Zeitung, Maribor, 1944, 19./20 August
149. The Ženjak (Harigast) helmet, the oldest Germanic language monument. Untersteirischer Kalender, 1944, Vol. III, pp. 75–77
150. The end of the Gottscheers. The story of a colonization from Carinthia and East Tyrol. Die Furche, 1947, 10 May
151. The end of the Gottscheers. Volkszeitung (Klagenfurt), 1947, 31 May
152. The development of Austrian colonization in the Bačka. Die Furche, 1947, 20 September
153. Prehistory and early history of the Wildon district. The Roman period in central Styria. Balduin Saria, Graz, 1947, 20 p. (hectographed)
154. A numismatic exhibition in Graz. Steirerblatt, Graz, 1948, 30 December
155. The local museum of the town of Gnas (500 years of market rights). Oststeirische Rundschau 2nd year, issue 8, 8 February 1948, p. 2
156. Classical studies in the political sphere. Die Furche, 1949, No. 14, 2 April
157. On the trail of Flavia Solva. Grenzbote, Leibnitz 1949, 14 April
158. Austria's most unknown Roman town. On the trail of Aelium Cetium, the old St. Pölten. Die Furche, 1949, 24 September
159. New inscriptions from the Noric-Pannonian border region. Jahreshefte d. österreichischen archäologischen Instituts, 1949, Vol. XXXVI, Bbl. 41—66
160. The Roman estate of Winden am See. Volk und Heimat, 1949, Vol. 2, No. 18, p. 15 ff.
161. The restoration of the cathedral in Sankt Pölten. Steirerblatt, 1950, 3 January
162. A Roman wine press from Austria. Der Winzer, 1950, 6th year, January
163. Collecting old coins. Volk und Heimat, 3rd year, 1950, No. 5, March, pp. 5–7
164. The archaeological excavations near Parndorf. Burgenländisches Leben, 1950, September, p. 5 ff.
165. A Roman manor house in Burgenland. Die Furche, 1950, 11. November
166. A Roman manor house in Burgenland [reprint]. Volk und Heimat, 1950, Vol. 3, No. 23, December, p. 13 f.
167. On Germanness in Lower Styria. Kulturspiegel Salzburg, 1950, 4th issue, p. 15 f.
168. A new Old Slavic sanctuary?. Carinthia, 1950, 8. Vol. 140, pp. 384–389
169. Noricum and Pannonia. Historia, 1950, Vol. I, pp. 436–486
170. The excavations near Parndorf. Wiener Universitätszeitung, 1951, 1 January
171. Wine crises in ancient Rome. Volk und Heimat, 1951, Vol. 4, No. 4, February, p. 5 f.
172. Roman excavations in Sankt Pölten. St. Pöltener Zeitung, 1951, 10 May
173. The prehistoric burial mounds in Burgenland. Volk und Heimat, 1951, Vol. 4, No. 13, July, p. 2 f.
174. Ancient Roman estate in Burgenland. Volk und Heimat, 1951, Vol. 4, No. 19, October, pp. 13–15
175. The Roman inscriptions in Burgenland. Burgenländische Heimatblätter, Mattersburg, 1951, Vol. XIII, pp. 1–9
176. The mosaic find from Heidehof between Parndorf and Bruckneudorf. Burgenländische Heimatblätter, Mattersburg, 1951, Vol. XIII, pp. 49–65
177. A find note from Purbach. Burgenländische Heimatblätter, Mattersburg, 1951, Vol. XIII, pp. 209
178. The Roman gravestone from Neumarkt im Tauchental. Burgenländische Heimatblätter, Mattersburg, 1951, Vol. XIII, pp. 224–229
179. Excavations in Sankt Pölten (Cetium). Unsere Heimat, 1951, Vol. XXII, pp. 108–114
180. A Paleolithic hunting station in the Karawanks. Der Anblick, 1951/52, 6th year, issue 5, p. 118 f.
181. Sankt Pölten's Roman past. Die Stimme Österreichs. Sonderheft St. Pölten, 1951, 5th year, p. 5 ff
182. The Roman estate of Winden am See. Burgenländische Forschungen, Vol. 13, Eisenstadt, 1951, 69 p. with 24 illus., 55 fig. and 8 app.
183. The excavations of the Austrian Archaeological Institute near Parndorf. Pro Austria Romana, Vienna, 1951, Vol. I, pp. 5–6
184. Excavations in Sankt Pölten. Pro Austria Romana, Vienna, 1951, Vol. I, pp. 23–24
185. Excavations in 1951 near Parndorf. Pro Austria Romana, Vienna, 1951, Vol. I, pp. 37–38
186. An autumn excavation in Mörbisch am See. Volk und Heimat, 1952, Vol. 5, No. 1, Januar, p. 7 f.
187. Second preliminary report on the excavations near Heidehof between Parndorf and Bruckneudorf. Burgenländische Heimatblätter, Mattersburg, 1952, Vol. XIV, pp. 97–102
188. Anton Krempl's draft of a Slovenian grammar (1824—1826). Südost-Forschungen, Munich, 1946/52, Vol. XI, pp. 303–306
189. A coin amulet from Mörbisch am See. Burgenländische Heimatblätter, Mattersburg, 1952, Vol. XIV, pp. 145–149
190. Roman cinerary monuments in Celeia. Jahreshefte d. österreichischen archäologischen Instituts, 1952, Vol. XXXIX, Bbl. 77—84
191. Roman stones in Piber near Köflach. Zeitschrift des Historischen Vereins für Steiermark, 1952, Vol. XLIII, pp. 184–186
192. A Roman estate in Mörbisch am See. Pro Austria Romana, Vienna, 1952, Vol. II, pp. 1
193. Excavations in Parndorf 1952. Pro Austria Romana, Vienna, 1952, Vol. II, pp. 51–52
194. A rediscovered Roman inscription from Sankt Pölten. Pro Austria Romana, Vienna, 1952, Vol. II, pp. 53–54
195. An ancient Traisen river regulation. Mitteilungen des Kulturamtes der Stadt St. Pölten, 1952, issue 21 and 22
196. New Ptuj excavations. Neue Chronik zur Geschichte und Volkskunde der innerösterreichischen Alpenländer, 1952, 22 June
197. The Roman bath near Parndorf. Volk und Heimat, 1952, Vol. 5, No. 22, November, p. 5 f.
198. On the Sankt Pölten Neptune inscription. Mitteilungen des Kulturamtes der Stadt St. Pölten, 1953, pp. 6–7
199. Excavations in Split. Archiv für Orientforschung, Vienna, 1953, p. 392
200. The new Yugoslavian excavations on the castle hill in Ptuj. Zeitschrift des Historischen Vereins für Steiermark, 1953, Vol. XLIV, pp. 174–178
201. Rome and the southeast in antiquity. Südost-Forschungen, Munich, 1953, Vol. XII, pp. 2–20
202. On the Sankt Pölten Neptune inscription. Pro Austria Romana, Vienna, 1953, Vol. III, pp. 18
203. Parndorf excavation. Pro Austria Romana, Vienna, 1953, Vol. III, pp. 37–38
204. Fragment of an anthropomorphic vessel from Sankt Pölten. Beiträge zur älteren europäischen Kulturgeschichte, 1953, Vol. II, pp. 212–222
205. Nikola Vulić (1872—1945). Südost-Forschungen, Munich, 1953, Vol. XII, pp. 269 f
206. Carl Patsch †. Südostdeutsche Heimatblätter, Munich, 1953, Vol. II, issue 2, pp. 42–43
207. Luigi Kasimir. Südostdeutsche Heimatblätter, Munich, 1953, Vol. II, issue 4, pp. 34–35
208. The Ljubljana Germanness. Its origins and development. Südostdeutsche Heimatblätter, Munich, 1953, Vol. II, issue 4, pp. 3–9
209. Margarete Weinhandl, a poet from Lower Styria. Südostdeutsche Heimatblätter, Munich, 1953, Vol. II, issue 3, pp. 41–42
210. History of the Southeast German ethnic groups. Der Göttinger Arbeitskreis, Series No. 42, Würzburg 1954, 36 p., 1 map
211. Report on a test excavation in the medieval castle complex of Burg. K. Ulbrich — A. Ratz, Die Wehranlagen von Burg (= Burgenländische Forschungen 25), Eisenstadt 1954, pp. 184–196 (with H. Mitscha-Märheim and A. Ohrenberger)
212. Foreword [Brief history of Graz]. Festschrift zum 100jährigen Bestand der Firmen Jossedt u. Oblack und Josseck u. Schmidt, Graz 1954, pp. 3–5
213. An ancient stream regulation in Cetium (Sankt Pölten). Jahreshefte d. österreichischen archäologischen Instituts, 1954, Vol. XLI,Bbl. 89—102
214. Classical studies in the political sphere. Ostdeutsche Wissenschaft, Munich, 1954, Vol. I, pp. 211–230
215. The development of the old Serbian coinage. Südost-Forschungen, Munich, 1954, Vol. XII, pp. 22–61
216. Excavation in 1955 at the Roman estate between Parndorf and Bruckneudorf. Pro Austria Romana, Vienna, 1955, Vol. V, pp. 39–41
217. The Bakery in Ptuj. Zeitschrift des Historischen Vereins für Steiermark, 1955, Vol. XLVI, pp. 191–193
218. The main dates of the [Roman] imperial history. Historia Mundi, 1956, Vol. IV, pp. 191–199
219. Art in the Roman Empire. Historia Mundi, 1956, Vol. IV, pp. 361–376
220. The early medieval church in Bruckneudorf. Pro Austria Romana, Vienna, 1956, Vol. VI, pp. 35–36
221. The prehistoric ring wall systems in Slovenia. Südost-Forschungen, Munich, 1956, Vol. XV, pp. 41–48
222. The current population situation in the Gottschee district. Südostdeutsche Heimatblätter, Munich., 1956, Vol. V, pp. 99–100
223. The Burgenland Croats. Südostdeutsche Vierteljahresblätter, Munich, 1957, Vol. VI, pp. 163–166 (under the pseudonym Alois Lahovich)
224. On the etiological interpretation of Roman sculptures. Festschrift für Sas-Zaloziecky, Graz 1957, pp. 158–162
225. Roman grave inscription from Murau. Schild von Stein, 1957, Vol. 7, pp. 38–40
226. Radoslav Grujić (1878—1955). Südost-Forschungen, Munich, 1957, Vol. XVI, p. 449 f.
227. The current situation of Germanness in Yugoslavia. Der neue Bund, 1958, Vol. 7, pp. 13–18
228. Vladimir R. Petković (1874—1956). Südost-Forschungen, Munich, 1958, Vol. XVII, p. 243 f.
229. Germanic archaeological finds from the western southeast. Südostdeutsches Archiv, 1958, Vol. I, pp. 76–87
230. The geographical knowledge of the Greeks and Romans of the Eastern Alps. Ostdeutsche Wissenschaft, Munich, 1958, Vol. V, pp. 89–98
231. Stefan Kraft and the founding of the German-Hungarian School Foundation in 1911. Südostdeutsche Vierteljahresblätter, Munich, 1959, Vol. VIII, pp. 185–189
232. The ancient foundations of southeastern European cultures. Völker und Kulturen Südosteuropas, München 1959, pp. 1–16
233. The Christianization of the Danube region. Völker und Kulturen Südosteuropas, München 1959, pp. 17–31
234. Epigraphic material from Styria. Schild von Stein, 1959/60, Vol. 9, pp. 43–46
235. The Gymnasium in Neu Werbaß as part of the higher German school system in the southeast. Südostdeutsche Vierteljahresblätter, Munich, 1960, Vol. 9, pp. 76–83
236. The founding of the German Evangelical Christian Church A. B. in the Kingdom of Yugoslavia. Ostdeutsche Wissenschaft, Munich, 1960, Vol. VII, pp. 263–285
237. A new Boian gravestone from the deserta Boiorum. Omagiu lui Const. Daicoviciu, Bukarest 1960, pp. 495–499
238. Viktor Hoffiller (1877—1954). Südost-Forschungen, Munich, 1960, Vol. XIX, p. 395
239. Ptuj city coat of arms. Neue Chronik zur Geschichte und Volkskunde der innerösterreichischen Alpenländer, 1960, No. 57, 12 October (= Eigenbeilage zu No. 237 der Südost-Tagespost), pp. 2–3
240. The changing fortunes of Macedonia. Südostdeutsche Vierteljahresblätter, Munich, 1961, Vol. 10, pp. 34–38
241. Medieval Saxon mining in the Balkans. New discoveries and research. Ostdeutsche Wissenschaft, Munich, 1962, Vol. IX, pp. 131–150
242. Mihovil Abramić (1884—1962). Südost-Forschungen, Munich, 1962, Vol. XXI, pp. 410–411
243. Ejnar Dyggve (1887—1960). Südost-Forschungen, Munich, 1962, Vol. XXI, pp. 411–473
244. The research into the old Serbian coinage. Numismatische Literatur Osteuropas und des Balkans, 1963, Vol. 2, pp. 58–81
245. Forty years ago. The founding of the "Evangelical Church District A. B. in the Kingdom of SHS". Bote der lutherischen und reformierten Glaubensgenossen aus Jugoslawien, 1963, Vol. 1, after Easter
246. What does Primož Trubar have to say to us today?. Südostdeutsches Kulturwerk, Kleine Südostreihe, issue 4, München 1963
247. The refugee movement during the Turkish period. Südostdeutsches Archiv VII, 1964, pp. 129–153
248. Nikola Radojčić (1882—1964). Südost-Forschungen, Munich XXIII, 1964, p. 333 f.
249. Dr. Wilhelm Neuner (1891—1964). Südostdeutsches Archiv VII, 1964, p. 234
250. Professor Hans Pirchegger — 90 years. Südost-Forschungen, Munich XXIV, 1965, p. 253 f.
251. Hans Pirchegger on his 90th birthday. Südostdeutsches Archiv VIII, 1965, pp. 194–196
252. Prof. Dr. Artur Betz 60 years. Südostdeutsche Vierteljahresblätter 14, 1965, pp. 179
253. The Roman manor house near Parndorf and its interpretation. Wissenschaftliche Arbeiten aus dem Burgenland 35 (Jubilee publication for Alphons A. Barb). Eisenstadt, 1966, pp. 252–271
254. The medieval German settlement in Carniola. Gedenkschrift für Harold Steinacker. München 1966, pp. 85–104
255. The Germanness between the Drava river and the Adriatic. Die Deutschen und ihre östlichen Nachbarn. Frankfurt 1967, pp. 246–252
256. Prof. Dr. Franz Babinger I. Südostdeutsche Vierteljahresblätter 16, 1967, p. 246
257. Archduke Charles II and the Slovenian Reformation. Innerösterreich 1564—1619. Graz 1968, pp. 119–151
258. Ten years of the Southeast German Historical Commission. Südostdeutsches Archiv X, 1967, pp. 1–8
259. The economic importance of Ptuj in the 15th century as reflected in the preserved monuments. Südostdeutsches Archiv X, 1967, pp. 102–107
260. Günther Freiherr Probszt on his 80th birthday. Südostdeutsches Archiv X, 1967, pp. 235–236
261. Bishop D. Gerhard May — 70 years. Südostdeutsche Vierteljahresblätter 17, 1968, pp. 122–123
262. The Slovenian Reformation and its significance for the cultural development of the Slovenians. Abhandlungen über die slowenische Reformation. (Geschichte, Kultur und Geisteswelt der Slowenen, Bd. 1), München 1968, pp. 23–49
263. The ancient city in southeastern Europe. Südosteuropa-Jahrbuch VIII, 1968, pp. 11–22
264. The first Slovenian national open-air gatherings in Ljutomer and Žalec in 1868. On the Styrian contribution to the formation of the Slovenian nation. Zeitschrift des Historischen Vereins für Steiermark LIX, 1968
265. Archeology in the Lexicon of Place Names in Drava Banovina. (in Slovenian) Geografski Vestnik 16, 1941, pp. 134–136
266. Loca fornicata. A contribution to the urban planning of Poetovio. Časopis za zgodovino in narodopisje, Maribor 1969, pp. 141–145
267. In memory of University Professor Dr. Ljudmil Hauptmann. Blätter für Heimatkunde, Graz 1969, pp. 2–4
268. Ljudmil Hauptmann (1884—1968). Südost-Forschungen 27, 1968, pp. 371–373
269. Rudolf Egger (1882—1969). Südost-Forschungen 28, 1969, pp. 290–293
270. The Styrian ancestors of the Slovenian poet and general Rudolf Maister. Blätter für Heimatkunde 1969, pp. 127–131
271. The Duke's grave at Frajhajm. Zeitschrift des Historischen Vereins für Steiermark LX, 1969, pp. 127–144
272. The first Slovenian national open-air gatherings in Ljutomer and Žalec in 1868. Zeitschrift des Historischen Vereins für Steiermark LX, 1969, pp. 85–105
273. Ancient inscriptions from Yugoslavia, Vol. I, Noricum and Pannonia Superior. Unchanged new edition. Amsterdam, Adolf M. Hakkert 1970
274. Reformation in the Yugoslavian area. (in Slovenian) Evangeličanski koledar 1970. Murska Sobota, pp. 38–47
275. The Reformation in the South Slavic region. Kirche im Osten 12, 1969, pp. 58–77
276. On the 1900th anniversary of the town of Ptuj. Der Untersteirer, 2nd year, No. 4/69, Graz, 1969
277. Epilogue to two Ptuj anniversaries. 1900th anniversary of the first mention of Poetovio. 100 Jahre Pettauer Gymnasium. In: Zeitschrift des Historischen Vereins für Steiermark LXIII, 1971, pp. 111–121
278. Rudolf Egger and the southeast. Carinthia I, 1970, pp. 582–587
279. Contributions to the history of the Reformation in Carniola. Südostdeutsches Archiv XIV, 1971, pp. 104–113
280. Ljubo Karaman (1886—1971). Südost-Forschungen 30, 1971, pp. 304–306
281. How I found my ancestors:. Blätter für Heimatkunde 1973, 2nd issue, pp. 34–38

C – 198 Articles in collective works
- Practical encyclopedia of classical antiquity – 145 entries
1. Aquae S...
2. Aurelius Augustus
3. canaliclarius
4. codicarii
5. Dalmatia (late ant. prov.)
6. Dea Coryphea
7. P. Dasumius Rusticus
8. C. Euf (?) Synforianus
9. Flavius Aper
10. T. Iunius D. f. Montanus
11. Lamad...
12. Municipium (Moesia Sup.)
13. Municipium Latobicorum
14. Nauportus
15. Neviodunum
16. ad Nonum (Moesia Sup.)
17. ad Nonum (Pann. Sup.)
18. Novae (Pann. Inf.)
19. Novae (Moesia Sup.)
20. ad Novas (two articles)
21. Novicianum
22. Ocra (town)
23. Ocra (Alpine pass)
24. ad Octavum
25. Oineus
26. 'Ολσοί
27. Onagrinum
28. Oneum
29. Ortopla
30. Philippos (of Stobi)
31. Piretis
32. ad Pirum summas Alpes
33. Poetovio
34. Pompei Praesidium
35. Pons Servili
36. Pons Tiluri
37. Pons Ulcae
38. Populos
39. Praesidium
40. Praevalitana
41. Praetoria Augusta
42. Praetorium
43. Praetorium (Dacia)
44. Praetorium (Dalmatia)
45. Praetorium Latobicorum
46. Praisidion
47. Praknos
48. Praktis
49. Πρασιἁς λιμνή
50. Prassoiboi
51. Prastillos
52. Praxilos
53. Precalis
54. Precona
55. Predavenses
56. Primaula
57. Primus (Bishop)
58. Prista
59. Pristis
60. Promona
61. Proteras
62. Psykterios
63. Pteron
64. ad publicanos
65. Publisca
66. Pucinum
67. Puciolis
68. Pullaria
69. Pultovia
70. Pydaras
71. Pylon
72. Pyraei
73. Pyrissaioi
74. Pyrogeri
75. Pyrri
76. Quadrata
77. Quadratis
78. Quadrato
79. Quadriburgium
80. Quarqueni
81. Ad Quartodecimum
82. Quesium
83. scrutator
84. Stobi
85. Thana
86. Ucasus
87. Οὐινουδρία
88. Οὐισόντιον
89. το Οὔχου
90. Οὐλίβουλα
91. Οὐλχαῖα ἕλη
92. Ulcinium
93. Ulcirus mons
94. Ulcisia castra
95. Ulmetum
96. Ulmus
97. Ulpianum
98. Ultinsium vicus
99. Ulucitra
100. Ululeus
101. Una
102. Uperaci
103. Urbas
104. Οὐβίανα
105. Οὐδδαούς
106. Οὐσιανά
107. Urgum
108. Urisium
109. Urpanus
110. Ursaria
111. Uscana
112. Uscudama
113. Οὐσδιχησιχή
114. Utsurgae
115. Utum
116. Utus
117. Valina
118. Vallae
119. Vallis Cariniana
120. Vannia
121. Vannianum regnum
122. Varciani
123. Vardaei
124. Variana
125. Varis
126. Varvaria
127. Vascum
128. Vegium
129. Vellanis
130. Vemania
131. Vendenis
132. Verea
133. Vero....rtitianus vicus
134. Vettii
135. Vetus Salina
136. Vicanovo
137. Vicianum
138. Viminacium
139. Vinceia
140. Vindenae
141. Vindomiola
142. Viva aqua
143. Volcera
144. Voleuci[o]nis vicus
145. Volustana
- Narodna enciklopedija SHS – 53 entries
1. artiluk
2. aspra
3. banovac
4. bradan
5. cekin
6. cvancik
7. dinar
8. dukat
9. falsifikovanje novaca
10. filer
11. folar
12. forint
13. franak
14. frizaški pfenizi
15. funta
16. groš
17. kopejka
18. kovnice novca
19. krajcar
20. kruna
21. libertina
22. lira
23. litra
24. Luczenbacher
25. Marija Tereziski talir
26. marjaš
27. matapan
28. Mazin
29. minca
30. muzeji
31. Napoléon d'or
32. novac
33. novac s krmačom
34. numizmatika jugoslovenska
35. numizmatičke zbirke
36. para
37. perpera
38. pijaster
39. potura
40. protestantske crkve
41. rajniš
42. rušpa
43. rublja
44. solad
45. starine u SHS
46. Stobi
47. Stockert
48. škuda
49. šljivak
50. talir
51. unča
52. vinar
53. vižlin
