= Barakovo, Demir Hisar =

Barakovo Бараково
- Village
- Air view of the village

- Location within North Macedonia
- Country: North Macedonia
- Region: Pelagonia
- Municipality: Demir Hisar

Population (2002)
  - Total: 67
- Time zone: UTC+1 (CET)
  - Summer (DST): UTC+2 (CEST)
- Website: .

Barakovo (Macedonian Cyrillic: Бараково) is a village in the municipality of Demir Hisar, North Macedonia. It is situated between the villages of Edinakovci and Graište.

== Demographics ==
In the 1467/1468 defter the village had 6 households and 1 widow. The onomastics consisted entirely of Christian Slavic anthroponyms.

In statistics gathered by Vasil Kanchov in 1900, the village of Barakovo was inhabited by 72 Christian Bulgarians.

According to the 2002 census, the village had a total of 67 inhabitants. Ethnic groups in the village include:

- Macedonians 66
- Serbs 1
