= Barakovo =

Barakovo may refer to:

- Barakovo, Bulgaria
- Barakovo, Demir Hisar, North Macedonia
- Barakovo, Russia (disambiguation), several towns in Russia
