= Bryanium =

- Βρυάνιον (Ancient Greek)
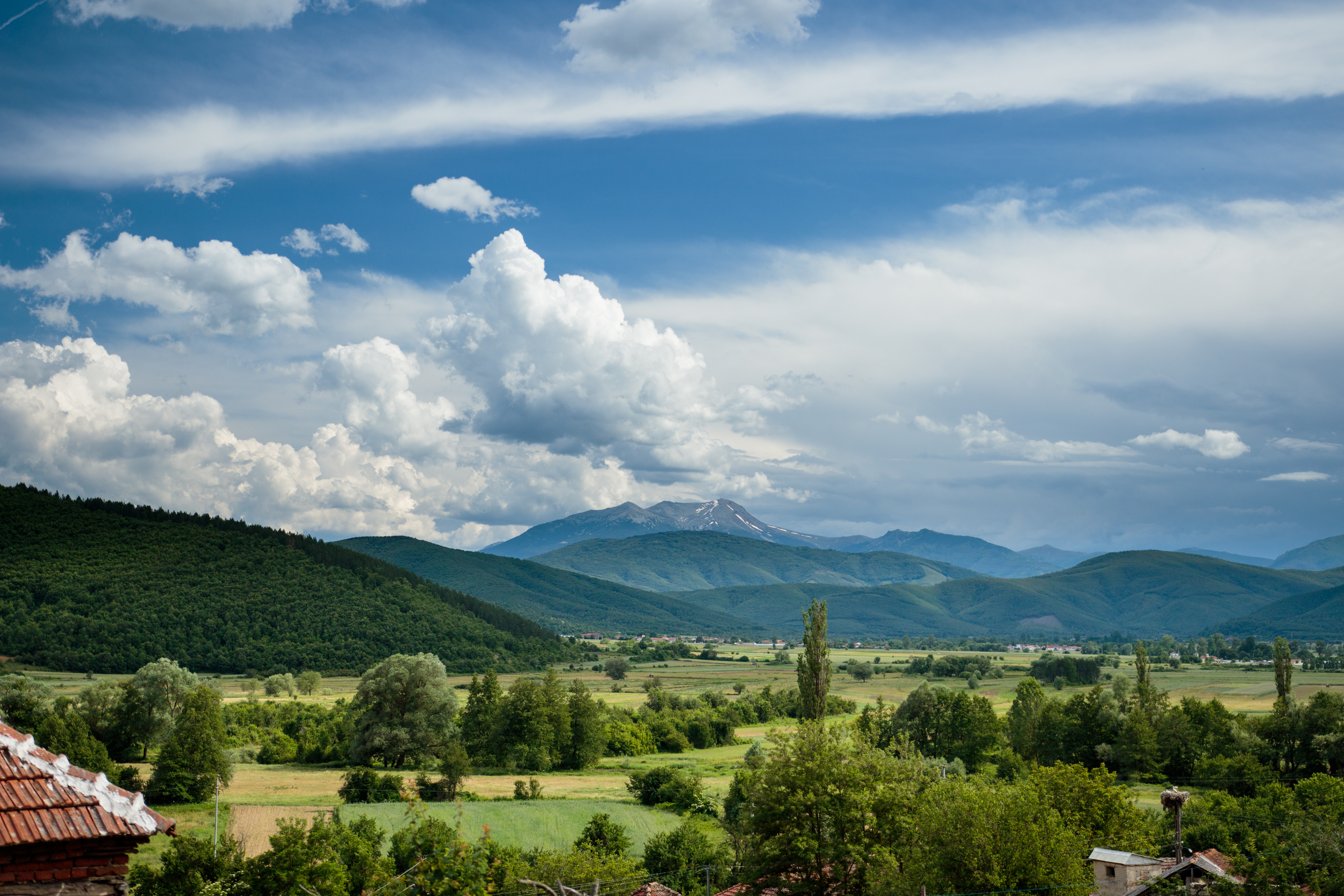
- Countryside of North Macedonia in which Bryanium was placed.
- Interactive map of Bryanium
- 41°14′27″N 21°13′09″E

Bryanium or Bryanion (Ancient Greek: Βρυάνιον) was a town of Deuriopus in Paeonia. Stephanus of Byzantium erroneously calls it a town of Epirus.

The site of Bryanium is tentatively located near the modern-day village of Graište, North Macedonia.
