= Barakovo, Russia =

Barakovo (Russian: Бараково) is the name of several inhabited places in Russia.

- Barakovo, Kaluga Oblast
- Barakovo, Ryazan Oblast
- Barakovo, Orenburg Oblast
- Barakova (also Barakovo), Chelyabinsk Oblast
- Alëshki (also Barakovo), Tver Oblast
- Burakovo (also Barakovo), Tver Oblast
- Pchëlkino (also Barakovo-Sarancha), Vladimir Oblast

== See also ==
- Barakovo (disambiguation)
