= Legio XV Apollinaris =

Roman legion

- Map of the Roman Empire in AD 125, under emperor Hadrian, showing the Legio XV Apollinaris, stationed at Satala (Saddagh, Turkey), in Cappadocia province, from AD 117 until the 5th century
- Active: 41/40 BC to sometime in the 5th century
- Country: Roman Republic and Roman Empire
- Type: Roman legion (Marian)
- Role: Infantry assault (some cavalry support)
- Size: Varied over unit lifetime. Approx. 3,500 fighting men + support at the time of creation.
- Garrison/HQ: Illyricum (48 BC–6 BC); Carnuntum (9–61); Syria (61–c. 73); Carnutum (c. 73–117); Satala (117–5th century)
- Nicknames: Apollinaris, "devoted to Apollo" under Augustus; Pia Fidelis, "faithful and loyal" under Marcus Aurelius
- Patron: Apollo
- Engagements: Tiberius' Marcomanni campaign (6); First Jewish Revolt (66–73); Dacian Wars (105–106); Trajan's Parthian campaign (115–117); Lucius Verus' Armenian campaign (162); Septimus Severus' Parthian campaign (197)

Commanders
- Notable commanders: Titus (officer); Trajan (campaign); Lucius Verus (campaign); Septimius Severus (campaign)

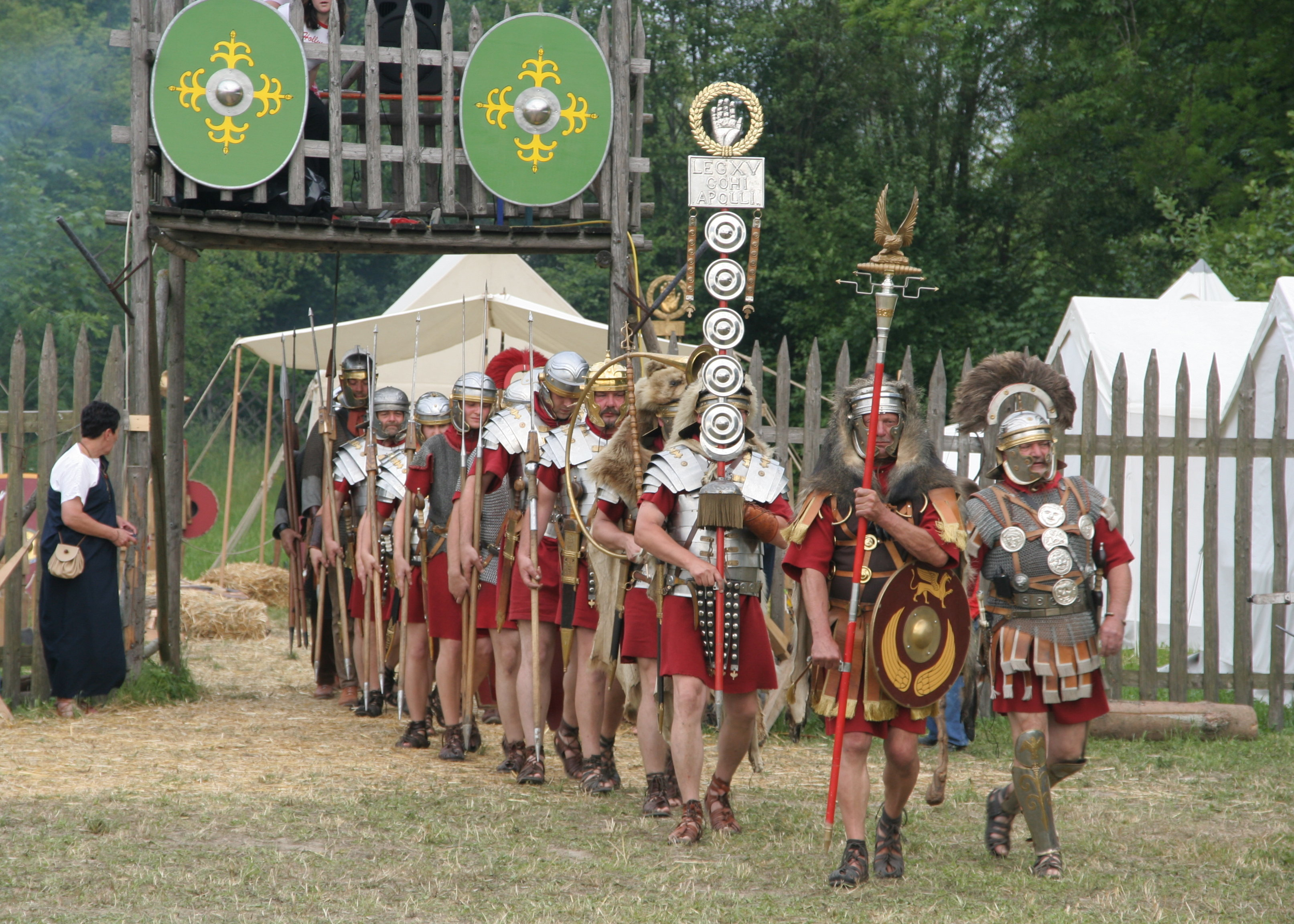
The Savaria Legio XV Apollinaris, reenactors moving off a reconstructed Castra in Pram, Austria

Legio XV Apollinaris ("Apollo's Fifteenth Legion") was a legion of the Imperial Roman army. It was recruited by Octavian in 41/40 BC. The emblem of this legion was probably a picture of Apollo, or of one of his holy animals.

XV Apollinaris is sometimes confused with two other legions with the same number: An earlier unit which was commanded by Julius Caesar and met its end in North Africa in 49 BC, and a later unit that was present at the Battle of Philippi on the side of the Second Triumvirate and then sent east.

== History ==
Octavianus (later Emperor Augustus) raised XV Apollinaris in order to end the occupation of Sicily by Sextus Pompeius, who was threatening Rome's grain supply. After the Battle of Actium, where the legion probably gained its epitaph Apollinaris, it was sent to garrison Illyricum, where it probably remained until 6 BC, though it might have seen action in the Cantabrian Wars.

In AD 6, Apollinaris was part of the huge campaign by Tiberius against the Marcomanni that was obstructed by a revolt in Pannonia. Apollinaris saw a good deal of fighting in the suppression of the revolt. According to the historian Balduin Saria, this legion erected a camp on the site of the Colonia Iulia Aemona, which was established as a camp in 14 or 15, after the legion left for Carnuntum. This hypothesis has been rejected by the researcher Marjeta Šašel Kos as unfounded. By the year 9 the legion was headquartered in Pannonia, in the town of Carnuntum.

There the unit stayed until sent to Syria and possibly Armenia by Nero in 61 or 62, these territories newly conquered from the Parthians. After the conclusion of the war with Parthia, the legion was sent to Alexandria but soon found itself engaged in the fierce fighting of the First Jewish Revolt, capturing the towns of Jotapata and Gamla. It was the Fifteenth that captured the Jewish general later to become famous as the historian Josephus. During this period the legion was commanded by Titus, who would later become Emperor.

After the suppression of the revolt, the legion returned to Carnuntum and rebuilt its fortress. Elements of the XVth fought in the Dacian Wars although the main body of the legion remained in Pannonia.

In 115, war with Parthia broke out again and the legion was sent to the front, reinforced with elements of the XXX Ulpia Victrix. The legion fought in Mesopotamia, which was conquered by the Romans. After the conflict was over the unit stayed in the east with a new headquarters at Satala in northeastern Cappadocia, with elements stationed at Trapezus on the Black Sea and at Ancyra, modern-day Ankara. From this base the XVth helped repulse an invasion of Alans in 134.

By 162, Rome and Parthia were at war once more; the campaign, led by Emperor Lucius Verus was successful, and the legion occupied the Armenian capital Artaxata. In 175, the general Avidius Cassius rebelled against Emperor Marcus Aurelius, but the Fifteenth remained loyal and earned the additional title Pia Fidelis.

The history of the legion after this point involves more conjecture. As a unit stationed in the Middle East, it is almost certain to have taken part in later campaigns against Parthia, including the sack of its capital Ctesiphon by the Romans in 197, and in wars against the new Sassanid power that arose in Persia thereafter, though there is no direct record of this. At the beginning of the 5th century, the legion reappears in history: it is still quartered at Satala and Ancyra, though having lost its post at Trapezus somewhere along the way, and is under the command of the Dux Armeniae.

== Attested members ==
Name	Rank	Time frame	Province	Source
Marcus Julius Romulus	legatus legionis	c. AD 49		AE 1925, 85
Quintus Julius Cordinus Gaius Rutilius Gallicus	legatus legionis	52–54		AE 1920, 55
Aulus Marius Celsus	legatus legionis	c. 63		Tacitus, Annales XV.25
Titus Flavius Vespasianus	legatus legionis	67–68		
Marcus Tittius Frugi	legatus legionis	c. 69		Josephus, Bellum Judaicum, VI.237
Sextus Sentius Caecilianus	legatus legionis	c. 71		
Quintus Egnatius Catus	legatus legionis	c. 73		
Marcus Ulpius Dasius	Optio	c. 80-138		CIL III 4491
Gaius Minicius Fundanus	legatus legionis	c. 90s		ILJug-03, 1627
Marcus Vettius Valens	legatus legionis	c. 137		CIL XI, 383
Rutilius Pudens Crispinus	legatus legionis	223–225		AE 1929, 158
Manius Acilius Glabrio Gnaeus Cornelius Severus	tribunus laticlavius	c. 140		CIL XIV, 4237
Marcus Messius Rusticianus	tribunus laticlavius	c. 137–140		AE 1983, 517, AE 1988, 720
Aulus Julius Pompilius Piso	tribunus laticlavius	c. 163		CIL VIII, 2582 = ILS 1111
Lucius Gavius Fronto	praefectus castrorum	c. 117		

== Epigraphic inscriptions ==
- - Lucius Caecilius Luci filius / Papiria (tribu) Optatus / centurio legionis VII Geminae Felicis et centurio legionis XV Apollinaris (...). Barcelona (Barcino), Spain. CIL II, 4514.
- - Q(uintus) Atilius / Sp(uri) f(ilius) Vot(uria) Pri/mus interprex / leg(ionis) XV idem |(centurio) / negotiator an(norum) / LXXX / h(ic) s(itus) e(st) / Q(uintus) Atilius Cocta/tus Atilia Q(uinti) l(iberta) Fau/sta Privatus et / Martialis hered(es) / l(iberti?) p(osuerunt). Boldog, Slovakia. AE 1978 00635.

== See also ==
- List of Roman legions
- Roman soldiers in the East
- Notitia Dignitatum, the document stating XV Apollinaris, 5th century
