= Derriopos =

Derriopos or Deuriopus (Strabo: Δευρίοπος Deuriopos; Stephanus of Byzantium: Δουρίοπος Douriopos) was a subdivision of Pelagonia, in what is today North Macedonia. Its exact limits are unclear, but it is known that it contained lands around the river Crna (ancient Erigonus). Livy describes Derriopos as a region of Paionia, but also locates the Derriopian city of Styberra in Pelagonia. This was because Pelagonia was used as a name for the westernmost part of Paionia, while the north-westernmost part of Pelagonia was referred to as Derriopos. The towns Bryanium and Styberra, near today's Prilep, were located in Derriopos. According to Livy, Philip V of Macedon founded the city of Perseis in Derriopos, named after his eldest son, Perseus.

After the defeat in the Battle of Pydna in 168 BCE, Macedonia was severely punished and reduced to a Roman province when also Perseis as a town must have been quickly renamed to Derriopos, to carry the same name as the whole region of Derriopos. There is a stone with inscription said to be found on the site of Styberra, erected there with the aim to commemorate a donation of 1500 denarii, by Philip, who was a politarch of Derriopos; that is, an elected governor of the town during the Roman province of Macedonia.

== Bibliography ==
- Hatzopoulos, M. B. (2020). Ancient Macedonia. Walter de Gruyter GmbH & Co KG. ISBN 978-3-11-071868-3.
