= Negova =

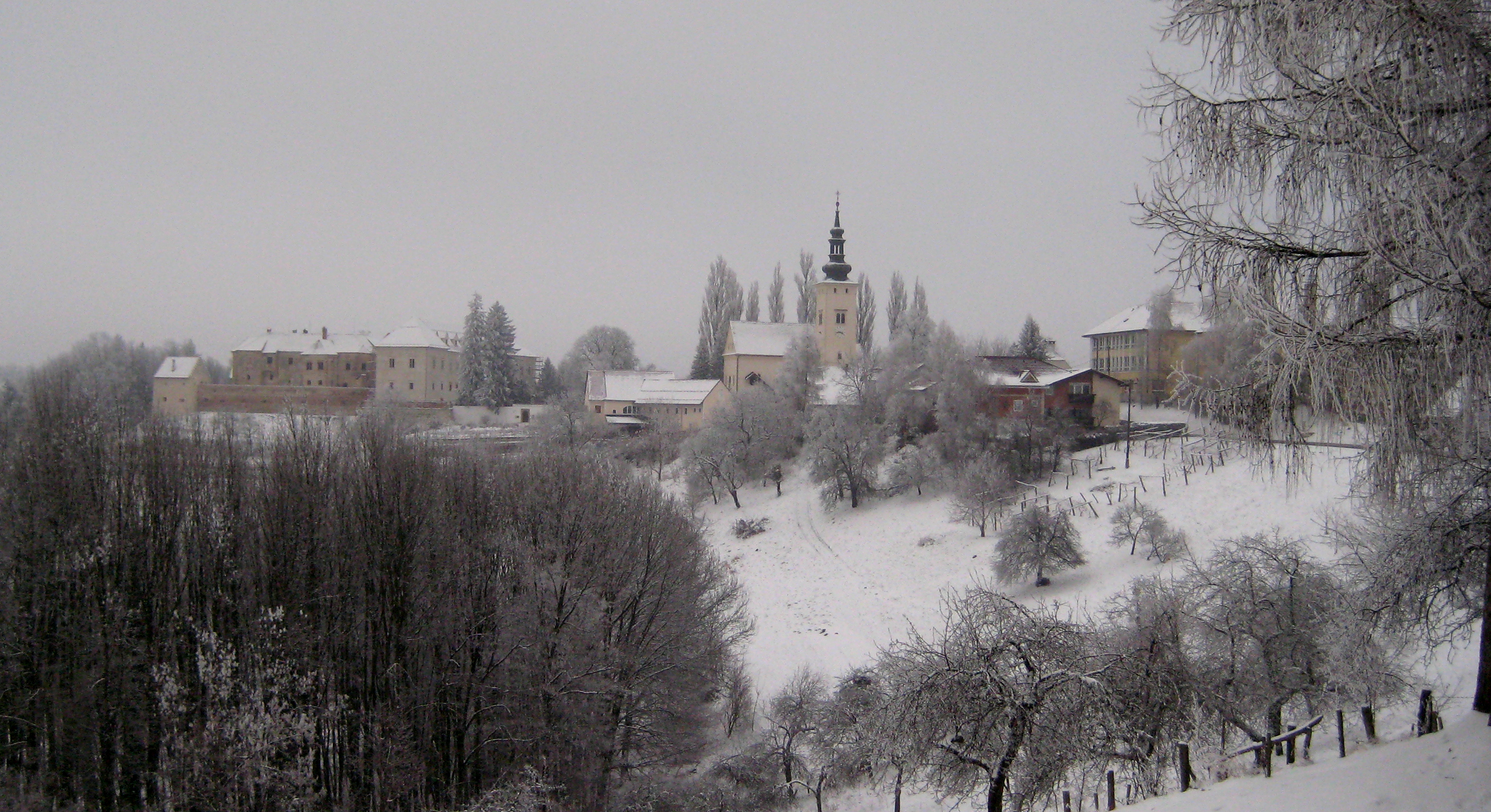

- Location in Slovenia
- Coordinates: 46°36′32.21″N 15°56′13.51″E
- Country: Slovenia
- Traditional region: Styria
- Statistical region: Mura
- Municipality: Gornja Radgona

Area
  - Total: 4.71 km^{2} (1.82 sq mi)
- Elevation: 293.3 m (962 ft)

Population (2020)
  - Total: 336
  - Density: 71.3/km^{2} (185/sq mi)

Negova (pronounced [ˈneːɡɔʋa]; German: Negau) is a village in the hills to the west of Gornja Radgona in northeastern Slovenia.

Negova Castle is a castle immediately to the north of the main settlement. It is a complex of buildings that are 16th- and early 17th-century extensions of the original castle built in 1425. Very few of the original furnishings and traces of wall paintings in the castle chapel are preserved.

The parish church in the settlement is dedicated to the Nativity of Mary and belongs to the Roman Catholic Archdiocese of Maribor. It was originally a 16th-century Gothic building, but was rebuilt in 1710 and has 19th-century additions.

The Negau helmets were found nearby.
