= Edinakovci =

Edinakovo Единаковци
- Village
- Air view of the village

- Location within North Macedonia
- Coordinates: 41.261520°N 21.247687°E
- Country: North Macedonia
- Region: Pelagonia
- Municipality: Demir Hisar

Population (2002)
  - Total: 338
- Time zone: UTC+1 (CET)
  - Summer (DST): UTC+2 (CEST)
- Website: .

Edinakovo (Macedonian: Единаковци) is a village in the municipality of Demir Hisar, North Macedonia.

== Demographics ==
Edinakovci is attested in the Ottoman defter of 1467/68 as a village in the vilayet of Manastir. The village had 40 households, 2 bachelors and 1 widow. The inhabitants attested almost exclusively bore typical Christian Slavic anthroponyms, with only 3 instances of the Albanian anthroponym Bardo (Bardhi) also appearing.

According to the 2002 census, the village had a total of 338 inhabitants. Ethnic groups in the village include:

- Macedonians 337
- Other 1
