= Velike Malence =

Place in Lower Carniola, Slovenia

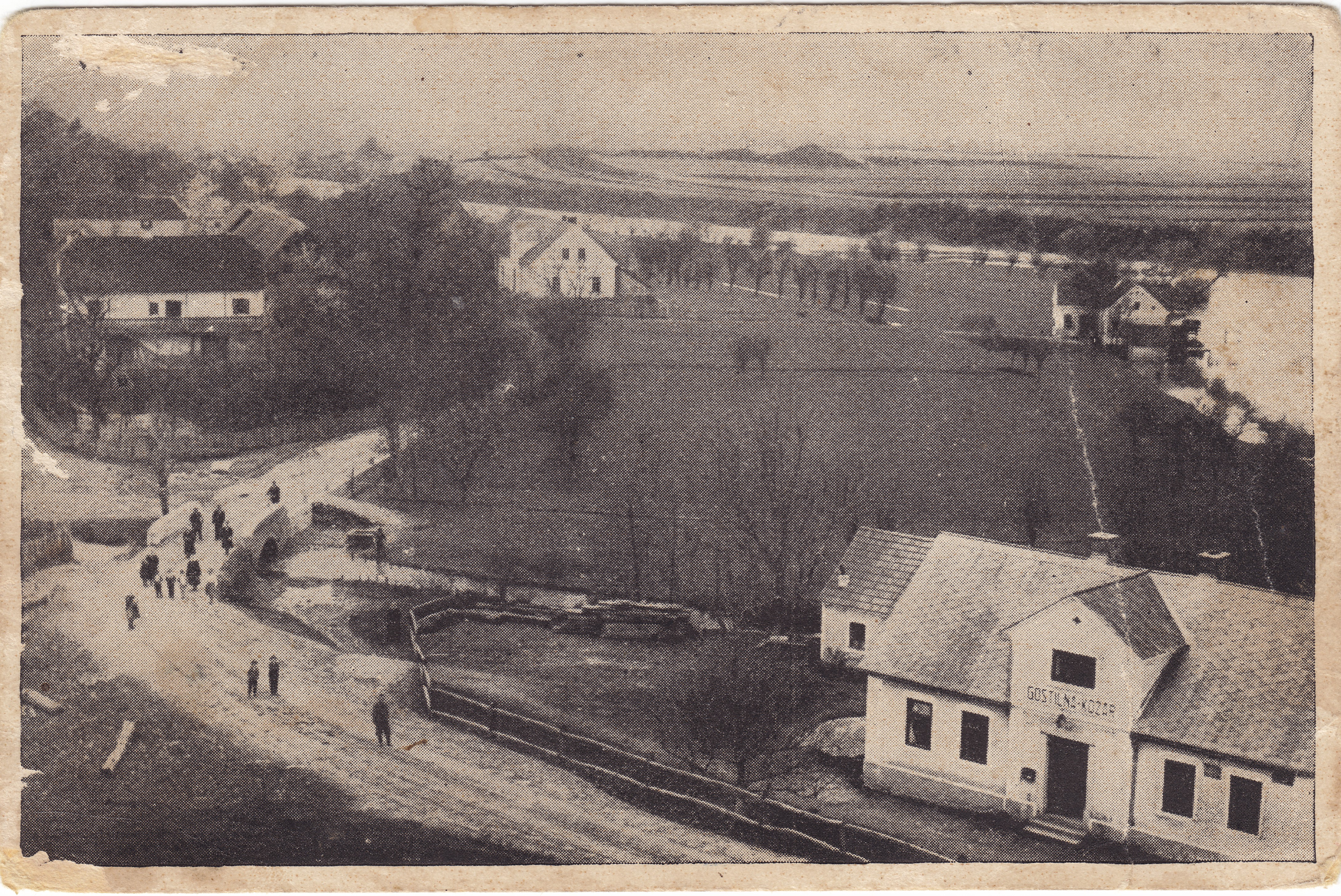
- 1930 postcard of Velike Malence

- Location in Slovenia
- Coordinates: 45°53′6.4″N 15°34′6.38″E
- Country: Slovenia
- Traditional region: Lower Carniola
- Statistical region: Lower Sava
- Municipality: Brežice

Area
  - Total: 4.08 km^{2} (1.58 sq mi)
- Elevation: 150.1 m (492 ft)

Population (2020)
  - Total: 312
  - Density: 76.5/km^{2} (198/sq mi)

Velike Malence (pronounced [ˈʋeːlikɛ ˈmaːlɛntsɛ]) is a village on the right bank of the Krka River, close to its confluence with the Sava, in the Municipality of Brežice in eastern Slovenia. The area is part of the traditional region of Lower Carniola. It is now included in the Lower Sava Statistical Region.

== Name ==
The name Velike Malence means 'big Malence', differentiating the settlement from the smaller village of Malence about 13 kilometers (8.1 mi) upriver. The village was attested as Mulbach and Mvlbach in 1302, Mulpach in 1322, and Mallenza in 1712. The name Malence is derived from the word *malin 'mill', referring to milling activity in the village.

== Church ==
The village church is dedicated to Saint Martin and belongs to the Parish of Čatež ob Savi. It is a Romanesque building, first mentioned in written documents dating to 1102. It was extensively rebuilt in the 19th century.

== Cultural heritage ==
Archaeological evidence indicates that the area has been occupied since the Neolithic. In the area between Malence and Saint Vitus's Church in neighboring Čatež ob Savi, an archaeological site that has been protected as a cultural monument by the Slovenian Ministry of Culture, traces of a villa rustica have been found with evidence of a Neolithic settlement layer below the Roman occupation level. Hallstatt and La Tène era Iron Age artefacts have also been found in the area.
