= Oblak =

Oblak is a surname. It is mainly used in Slovenia. Notable people with the surname include:

- Branko Oblak (born 1947), Slovenian footballer and manager
- Jan Oblak (born 1993), Slovenian footballer
- Jan Władysław Obłąk (1913–1988), Polish Roman Catholic bishop
- Lenart Oblak (born 1991), Slovenian biathlete
- Marijan Oblak (1919–2008), Croatian Roman Catholic archbishop
- Robert Oblak (born 1968), Slovenian footballer
- Sonja Lapajne Oblak (1906–1993), Slovenian architect
- Teja Oblak (born 1990), Slovenian basketball player, sister of Jan
