= Graište =

Graište Граиште
- Village
- Air view of the village

- Location within North Macedonia
- Coordinates: 41.237329°N 21.220058°E
- Country: North Macedonia
- Region: Pelagonia
- Municipality: Demir Hisar

Population (2002)
  - Total: 145
- Time zone: UTC+1 (CET)
  - Summer (DST): UTC+2 (CEST)
- Website: .

Graište (Macedonian: Граиште) is a village in the municipality of Demir Hisar, North Macedonia.

== Demographics ==
in the 1467/1468 Ottoman defter, the village had 22 households, 3 widows and 1 bachelor. The household heads almost entirely bore Slavic anthroponyms, with only a single instance of an Albanian anthroponym, Lazor.

In statistics gathered by Vasil Kanchov in 1900, the village of Boište was inhabited by 180 Christian Bulgarians.

According to the 2002 census, the village had a total of 145 inhabitants. Ethnic groups in the village include:

- Macedonians 145
