= Oesyme =

Coordinates: 40°49′25″N 24°19′21″E

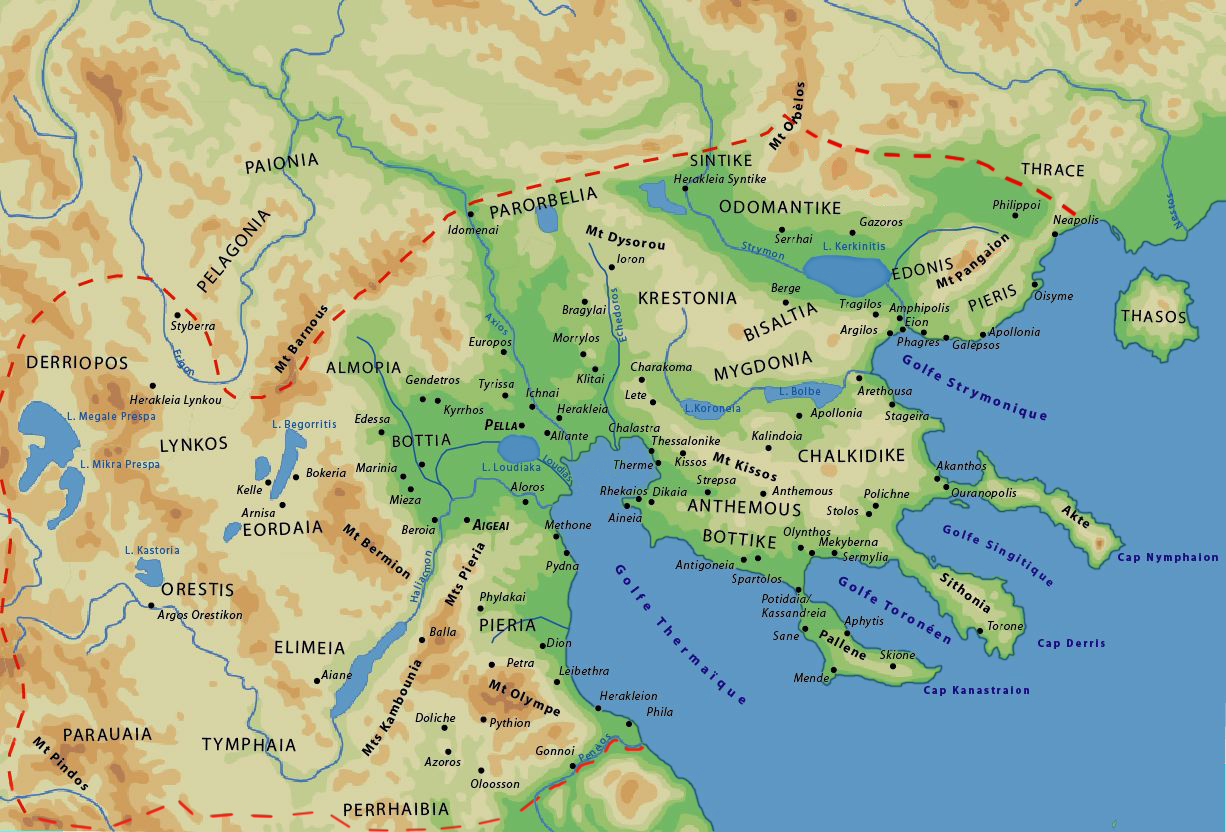
Oisyme shown within the region of Edonis (on the right / east)

Oesyme or Oisyme (Attic Greek: Οἰσύμη, Doric Greek: Οἰσύμα) and Aisyme or Aesyme (Ancient Greek: Αἰσύμη) was an ancient Greek polis (city-state) located in ancient Thrace and later in Macedonia. It was within the region of Pieras or Edonis between the river Strymon and the river Nestos.

Thucydides mentions it with Galepsus and notes that both were colonies of Thasos that sided with the Spartan army of Brasidas after it had taken Amphipolis in 424 BCE. Stephanus of Byzantium identifies it as the same Aesyme or Aisyme (Αίσύμη) named by Homer in the Iliad as the place of origin of Castianeira, mother of Gorgythion, who was fathered by Priam, king of Troy.

The town is mentioned by several ancient geographers including Ptolemy and Pliny the Elder. Diodorus notes the town under the misspelling Σύμη - Syme (omitting the initial vowels). The town also appears in the Periplus of Pseudo-Scylax as Σιούμη - Sioume. It is also mentioned in the Delphic Theorodochoi inscription. It was later renamed to Emathia (Ἠμαθία) after its occupation by Philip II of Macedon. According to Pseudo-Scymnus, it was named Emathia after the daughter of Makesse. It was considered a polis and an emporion at the same time.

Athenaeus quotes a passage from Armenidas where Oesyme is mentioned among the places of Thrace famous for the quality of their wines.

It is also mentioned in the Lexicon of the Ten Orators and the Suda.

The location of the ancient city is identified with the fortified citadel on Cape Vrasidas south of the village of Nea Peramos in the southern part of the bay of Eleutherai.

== See also ==
- Greek colonies in Thrace
