= Lake Achinos =

- Lake Tachinos or Cercinitis/Kerkinitis (ancient)
- Location within Greece
- Location: Serres Prefecture
- Coordinates: 41.20993355350315°N 23.129570717335543°E
- Type: former lake

Lake Achinos or Tachinos was a lake in the lower valley of the river Strymon, in the modern Serres regional unit and the ancient region of Edonis,. It was drained in 1932 by the Monks-Ulen company.

Its ancient name was either Lake Prasias or Lake Cercinitis; see Lake Prasias for discussion.

According to Arrian, Alexander the Great's fleet anchored here before sailing to the shores of Asia Minor. Archaeological findings (stone anchors etc.) and inscriptions demonstrate ancient navigation on the lake and lakeside settlements near the modern villages of Paralimni, Pethelinos, Psychiko, and Mesokomi.

The Strymon River connected Lake Cercinitis to the sea, allowing commercial navigation from the Strymonian Gulf nearly as far as Serres.

The modern Lake Kerkini is an artificial reservoir further upstream on the Strymon.
