= Galepsus =

Galepsus or Galepsos (Ancient Greek: Γαληψός) may refer to:

- Galepsus (Chalcidice), a town of Chalcidice, ancient Macedonia
- Galepsus (Thrace), a town of ancient Thrace
- Galepsus (mantis), a genus of insects
