= Phagres =

Coordinates: 40°46′21″N 23°57′32″E

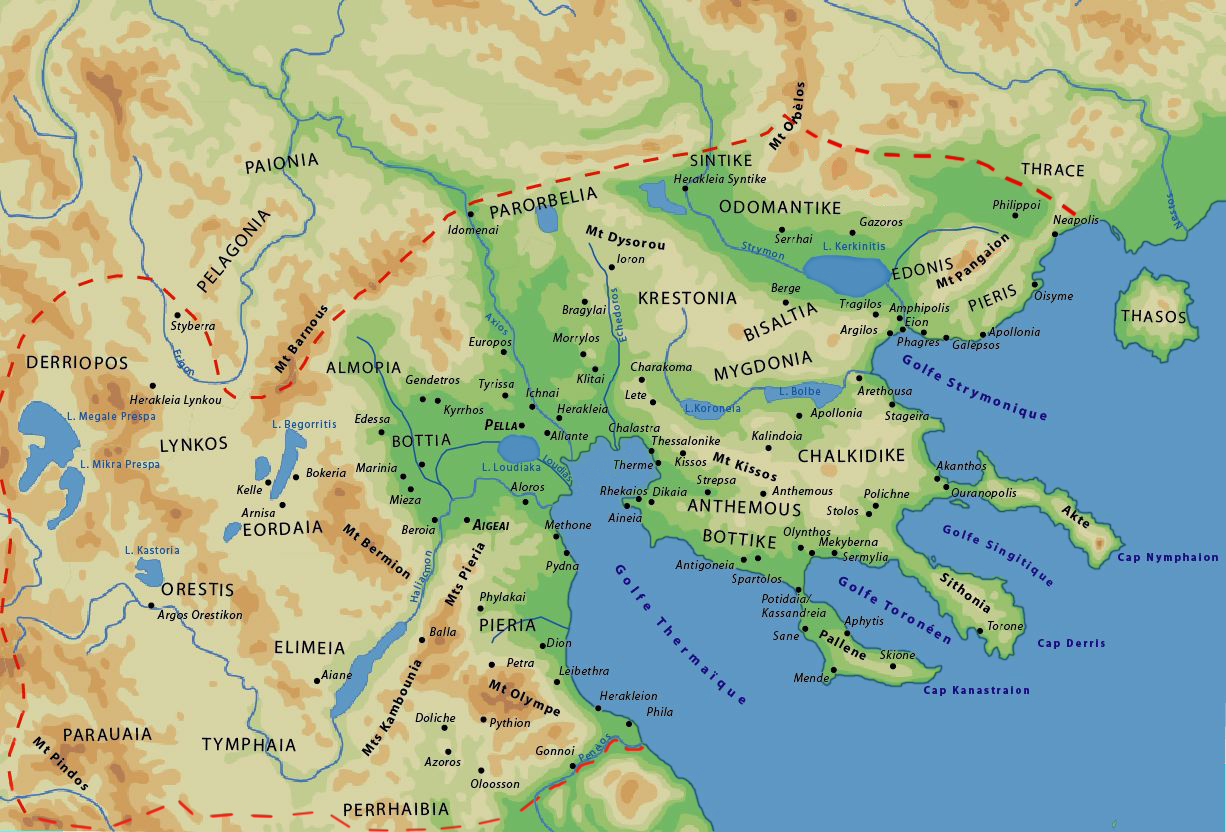
The town of Phagres in eastern Macedonia within the region of Edonis

Phagres (Ancient Greek: Φάγρης) was a Greek city located in ancient Thrace and later in Macedon, in the region between the river Strymon and the river Nestos called Edonis or Pieris. It was founded by colonists from Thasos. It was perhaps together with Galepsus and Apollonia occupied and destroyed by Philip II of Macedon after the capture of Amphipolis. Despite this, archeological remains include Hellenistic finds and indications that Phagres survived into the Roman period.

Its site is located near modern Orfani (Orphanion).

== See also ==
- Greek colonies in Thrace
