= Tower of Apollonia =

Tower in Greece

Coordinates: 40.7409495°N 24.1436566°E

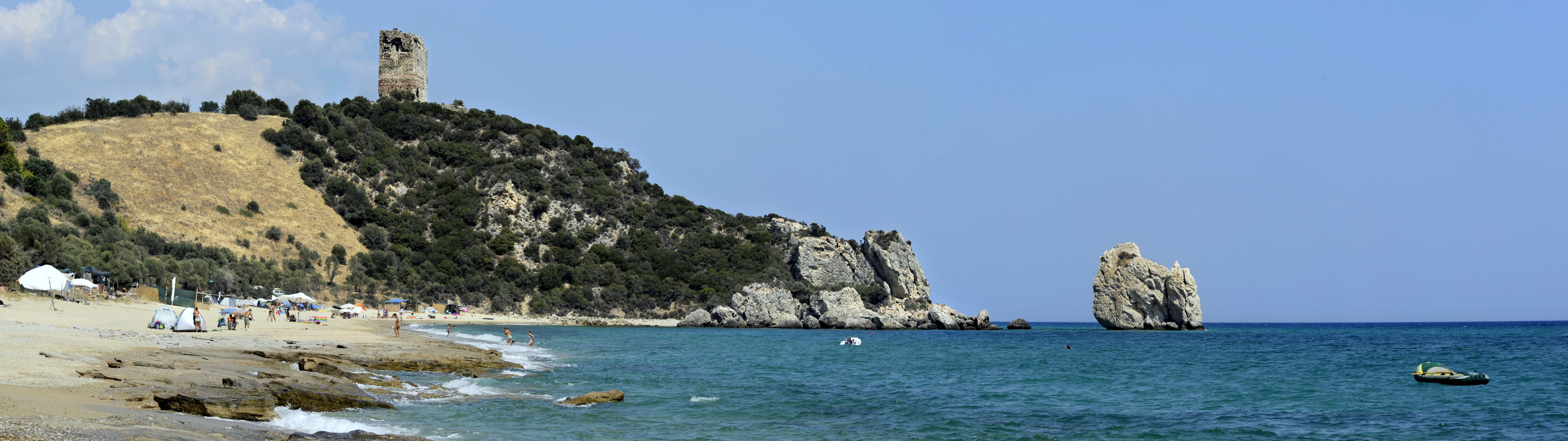
Tower of Apollonia

The Tower of Apollonia or Tower of Eleftheres (Greek: Πύργος Απολλωνίας or Πύργος Ελευθερών) stands on the coastal hill 27 kilometres (17 mi) east of the Strymon River estuary in the Thracian Sea. The small settlement of Pyrgos, some 700 m northeast of the tower, is named after it.

== Location and description ==
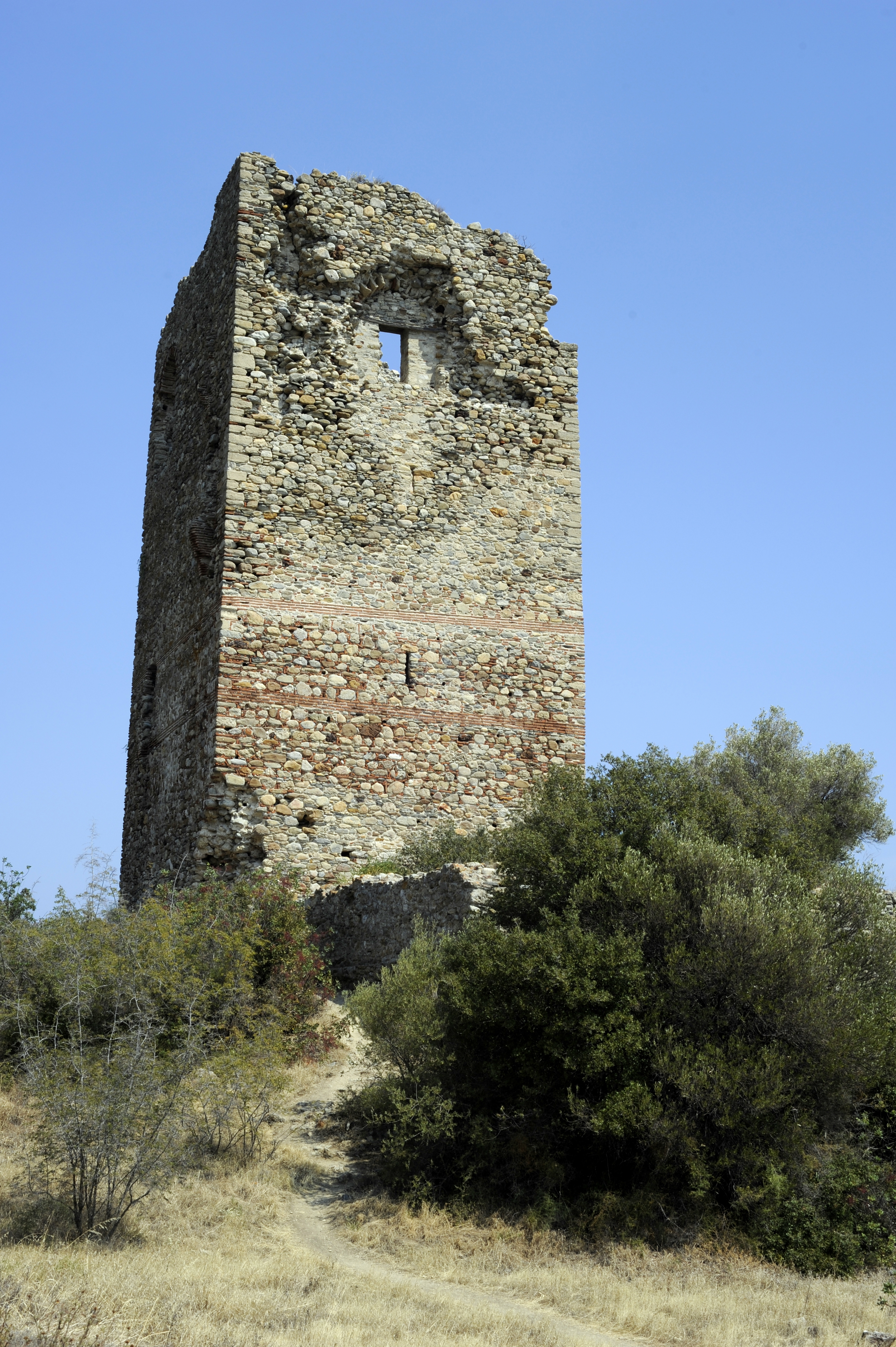
Closer view

The tower dates to the late Byzantine period, in the 14th century. It stands south of the modern Thessaloniki–Kavala road (Greek National Road 2), on a low earthen hill. Its site provides excellent overview of the coast between the estuary of the Strymon River to the west and the Gulf of Eleftheres to the east, i.e. between the two Byzantine fortified cities of Chrysopolis and Anaktoropolis.

The tower is surrounded by a square enceinte, with the southern side broken into three smaller walls. It is built of undressed stone, and 1.2–2.35 metres (3.9–7.7 ft) thick. A staircase on the southeastern wall led to the wall walk. Traces of buildings can be seen on the interior of the enceinte as well as on the exterior of its northern side. The tower itself is located on the northeastern corner of the enceinte, with the northern and eastern walls of the latter connecting directly with it. The tower is square, measuring 11 by 12 metres (36 ft × 39 ft), and built with careful masonry of rough-hewn stones, with multiple or lone bricks in the vertical and horizontal joints, and with ashlar blocks on the corners. Belts of four rows of bricks denote the levels of the second and third floor.

The tower survives to a considerable extent. Its entrance is 2 metres (6.6 ft) above ground and faces south towards the sea. Hence the tower comprises the entrance floor, a ground floor underneath as a basement, and three further storeys above. The basement, first (entrance), and, second storeys were separated by wooden floors, as can be seen by the surviving beam cases, while the second and third by a stone dome, supported by pendentives. The third and the fourth storeys were likely separated by a wooden floor. The fourth floor's ceiling is arched, supporting the roof with the parapets, which do not survive. On the eastern wall of the floor are two niches, part of the tower's chapel. A stone vaulted stairway that starts across from the tower entrance on the northern side of the tower, connects the first three floors, while the fourth floor was accessed by a wooden ladder, as was probably the case for the basement. The tower features large arched windows on all sides, as well as two lighting boxes, and machicolations on the northern and southern side.

Its name is probably erroneous, resulting from a confusion on the location of the ancient city of Apollonia.
