= Archaeological Museum of Kavala =

Coordinates: 40.9357°N 24.4039°E

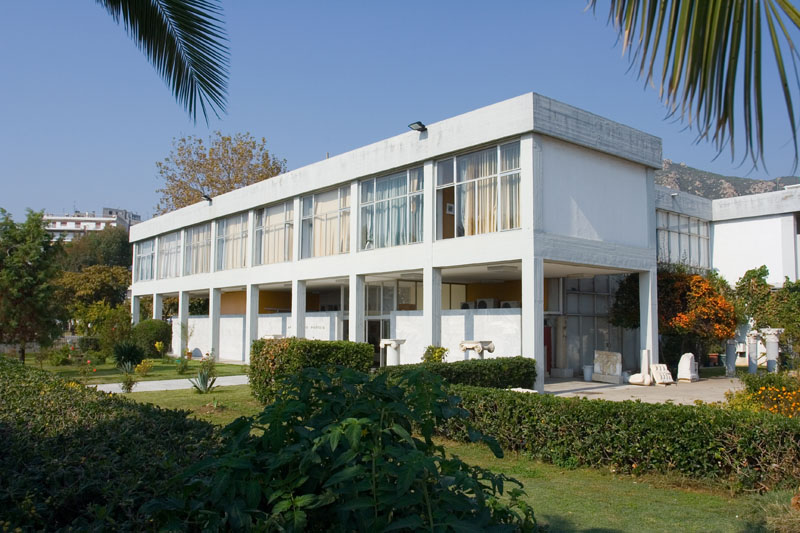
- External view of museum.
- Established: 1934
- Location: Kavala, Eastern Macedonia and Thrace, Greece
- Type: Archaeological museum

The Archaeological Museum of Kavala (Greek: Αρχαιολογικό Μουσείο Καβάλας) is a museum in Kavala, Eastern Macedonia, Greece, located towards the western end of the Ethnikis Antistasis road in Kavala.

The museum was established in 1934, and reopened in 1964 in its current premises. The museum as it stands today was built by the architects D. Fatouros and G. Triantaphyllides, professors of the Polytechnic School and the Aristotle University of Thessaloniki between 1963 and 1964.

The museum has been referred to as the most important archaeological museum in Eastern Macedonia and one of the most important museums in Greece. The museum contains prehistoric artifacts found all over the Kavala regional unit such as in Neapolis (old Kavala), Amphipolis and places such as Oisyme, Galypsos, Dikili Tas, Tragilos, Mesembria, Nikisiani and Avdira.

== Interior ==
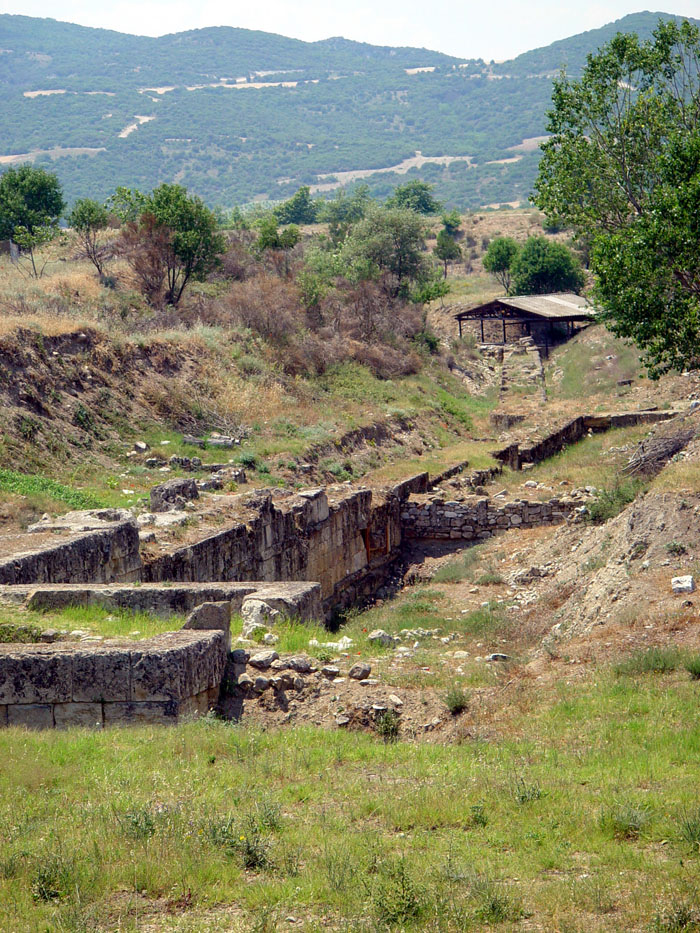
Amphipolis, the site that many of the museum exhibits were found

On the first floor of the museum are items from the wider region of Thrace, from Galypsos, Oisyme, ancient Topeiros and Tragilos, Abdera and Mesembria. Items range from clay figurines and sarcophagi, to coins of Macedonian kings, black-figure wares, a painted cist grave and metal pots. The Cycladic amphora (7th century BC) and a red-figure hydria (4th century BC) are of major note on the first floor.

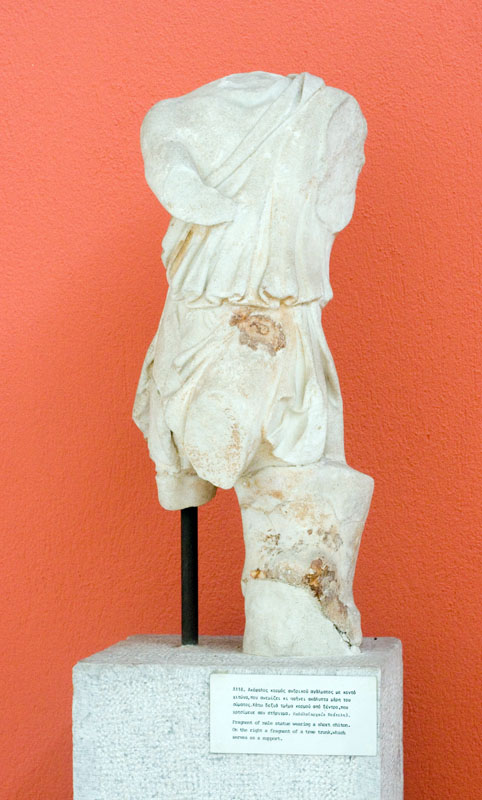
Fragment of male statue wearing a short chiton

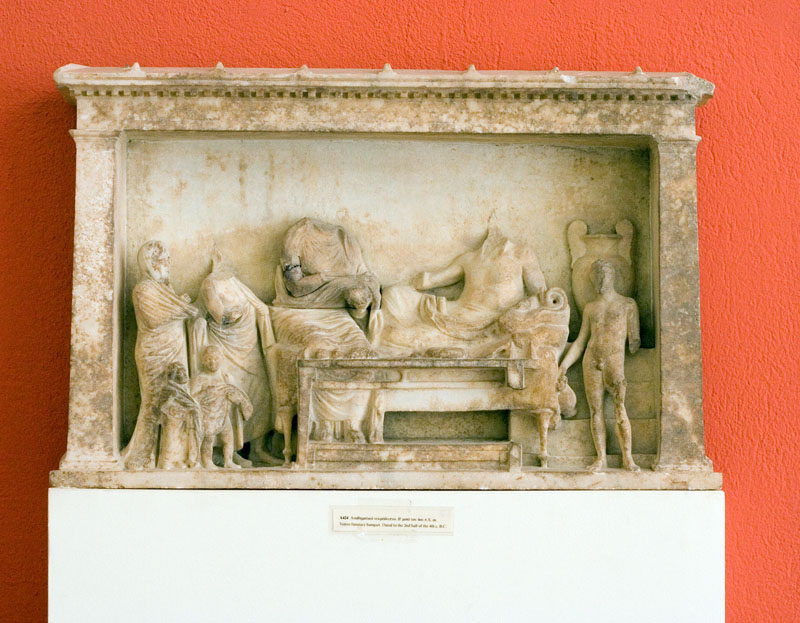
Α painted cist grave votive funerary banquet. 4th century BC

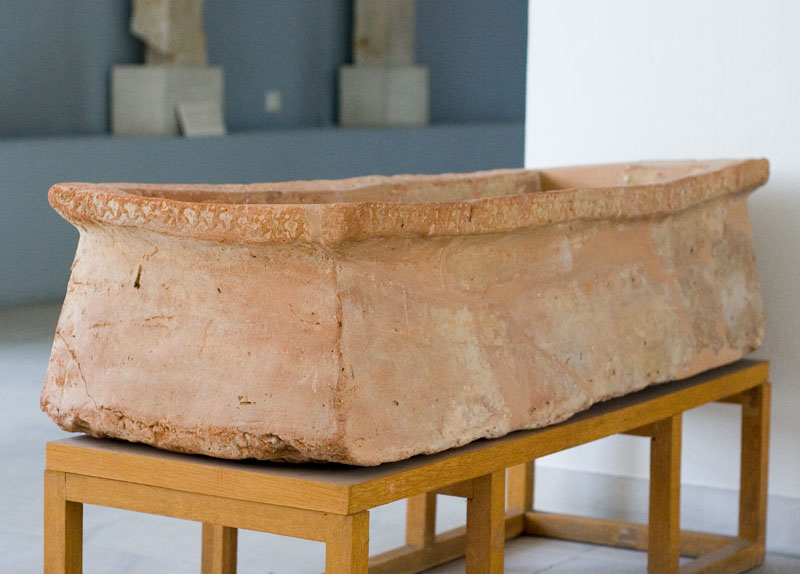
Α painted cist grave

== Exterior ==
The atrium and courtyard of the Kavala Archaeological Museum contain a number of architectural members excavated in various parts of Eastern Macedonia, dating back to the Roman Empire. There are also numerous stelai which are carved with reliefs and inscriptions.

== Renovation ==
Between 1999 and 2000, the museum underwent expansion and renovation. The museum was extended to accommodate for more exhibition rooms to display its permanent collections and to increase the number of temporary exhibitions in the museum.

The museum is open weekdays from 8:00 to 19:00 and weekends from 8:00 to 14:30 in the summer, but during weekdays in the winter, it closes at 17:00. The museum is closed on Mondays.
