= Lake Cercinitis =

Lake Cercinitis or Kerkinitis (Ancient Greek: Κερκινῖτις) is the ancient name for a lake in northern Greece.

It may correspond to the modern Lake Achinos or Tachinos on the Strymon river, now drained or to the smaller Lake Butkova, further north on the Strymon river. See Lake Prasias for discussion.

According to Arrian, Alexander the Great's fleet was anchored here before sailing to Asia Minor.
