= Pistyrus =

Coordinates: 40°58′17″N 24°35′31″E

Pistyrus or Pistyros (Ancient Greek: Πίστυρος), or Pistirus or Pistiros (Πίστιρος), or Bistirus or Bistiros (Βίστιρος), also known as Pisteira (Πίστειρα), was an ancient Greek polis on the coast of Edonis, in ancient Thrace. It was founded as a colony of Thasos and itself may have founded Pistiros in inland Thrace. The army of Xerxes I passed by Pistyrus after crossing the Nestus River. The name Pistyrus was also applied to the adjoining lake (now called Vasova), which was described by Herodotus as 30 stadia in circumference, full of fish, and exceedingly salty.

Pistyrus has been identified with the remains of a fortified settlement east of Pontolivado located near the Vasova salt lake. The fortifications are of the regular "Thasian" type. Among the finds are coins from Neapolis and Thasos, dated to 520–510 BCE.
