= Aesyme =

Coordinates: 40°49′25″N 24°19′21″E

Aesyme or Aisyme (Ancient Greek: Αίσύμη) is a town named by Homer in the Iliad as the place of origin of Castianeira, mother of Gorgythion, who was fathered by Priam, king of Troy. Stephanus of Byzantium identifies it as the same place as Oesyme, a Thasian colony in Pieris in ancient Thrace.
