= Lake Prasias =

Lake in northern Greece mentioned by Herodotus

Lake Prasias (Ancient Greek: Πρασιάς) is a lake near ancient Macedonia described in Herodotus's Histories as inhabited by Paeonians living in pile dwellings.

It is generally identified with the modern Lake Achinos or Tachinos on the Strymon, now drained, in which case Lake Cercinitis would be the modern Lake Butkova.

Some scholars identify it with the smaller Lake Butkova, further north on the Strymon, at the site of the Lake Kerkini reservoir, and believe that Lake Cercinitis is the modern Lake Achinos.

Yet others have identified it with Lake Doiran, which drains into the Vardar.
