= Galepsus (Chalcidice) =

Coordinates: 40°12′00″N 23°41′19″E

Galepsus or Galepsos (Ancient Greek: Γαληψός) was a town on the north coast of the peninsula of Sithonia, Chalcidice, ancient Macedonia. William Martin Leake states that Galepsus was the same place afterwards called Physcella, a distinction which was required, as there was another Galepsus at no great distance.

The site of Galepsus is about 1 mile (1.6 km) south of the modern Nikite.

== See also ==
- Galepsus (Thrace)
