= Galepsus (Thrace) =

Ancient Greek city

Coordinates: 40°45′00″N 23°59′04″E

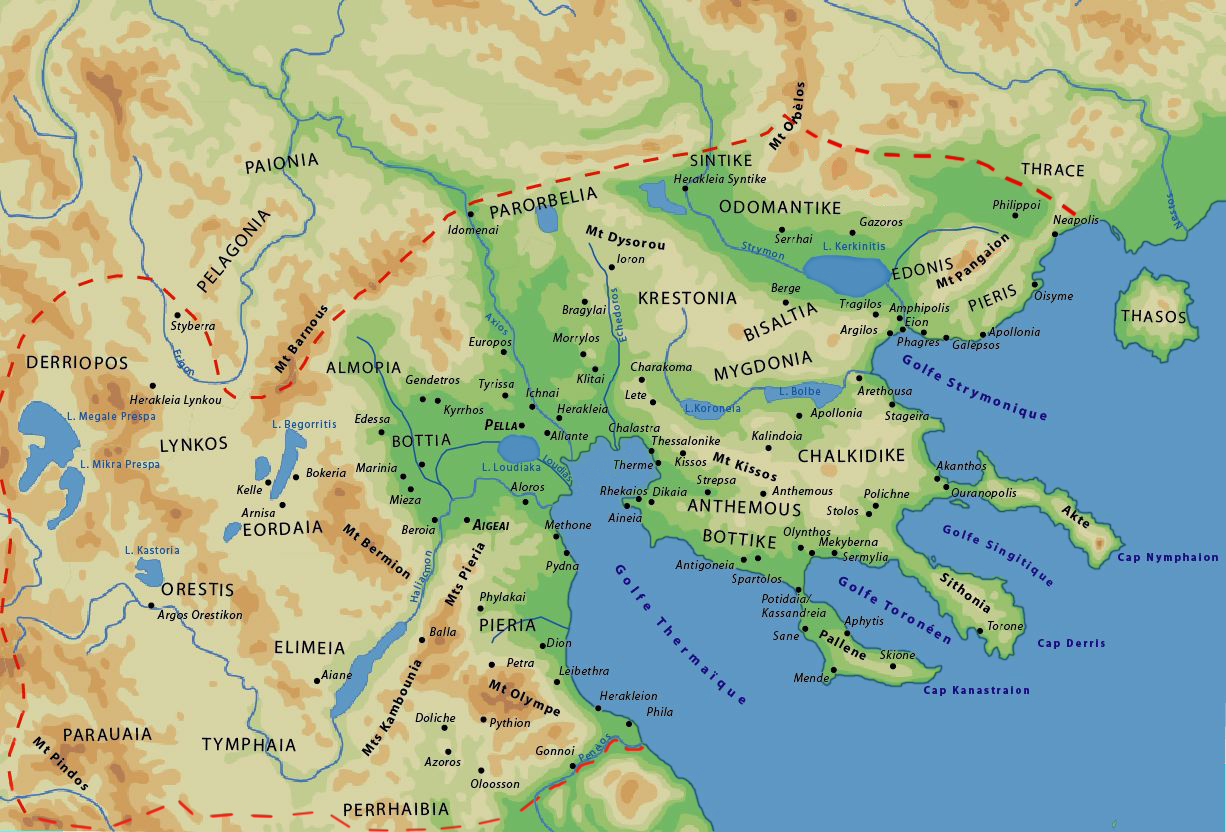
Galepsos within the region of Edonis

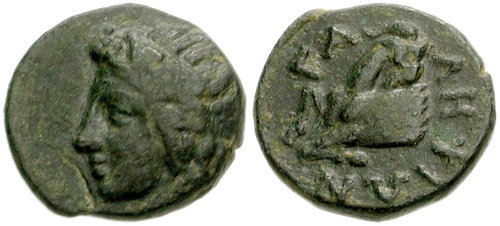
Bronze coin from Galepsus

Galepsus or Galepsos (Ancient Greek: Γαληψός) was a Greek city located in the region of Edonis in ancient Thrace and later in Macedon. It was located east of Phagres and about 17 km from Amphipolis. It belonged to the Delian League and it was founded as a colony of Thasos. After the conquest of Amphipolis it was occupied by Brasidas in 424 BCE, but recovered by Cleon in the ensuing year. Perseus of Macedon, fleeing the Romans who had defeated him at Pydna, sailed the mouth of the Strymon, and towards Galepsus, staying there before moving on to Samothrace.

It was named after Galepsos who was a descendant of Thasos and of Telephe.

The site of Galepsus is near the modern Kariani.

== See also ==
- Galepsus (Chalcidice)
