= Apollonia (Kavala) =

Coordinates: 40°44′28″N 24°08′41″E

Apollonia (Ancient Greek: Ἀπολλωνία) was an ancient town of the region of Edonis in Thrace and later of Macedon. It was located near tower Pirgos Apollonias on the mainland of Kavala (northern Greece) opposite the island of Thasos, described by the Epitomizer of Strabo and by Pomponius Mela being west of the Nestus, and erroneously by Livy, as between Maroneia and Abdera, which is too far east.

The site of Apollonia is near the modern Pirgos Apollonias.

== See also ==
- List of ancient Greek cities
