= Armenidas =

Ancient Greek philosopher

Armenidas (Ancient Greek: Ἀρμενίδας) or Armenides (Ancient Greek: Ἀρμενίδης) was a writer of ancient Greece who wrote a work on Thebes (Θηβαϊκα), which is referred to by the Scholiast on Apollonius Rhodius and Stephanus of Byzantium. But whether his work was written in prose or in verse, and at what time the author lived, is not known.

Very little of his writing exists today. A number of his fragments can be found in the Fragmenta Historicorum Graecorum of Karl Wilhelm Ludwig Müller, as well as Fragmente der griechischen Historiker by Felix Jacoby. Some of them discuss the Telchines, and the dogs of Actaeon.
