= Lake Kerkini =

Artificial reservoir in Central Macedonia, Greece

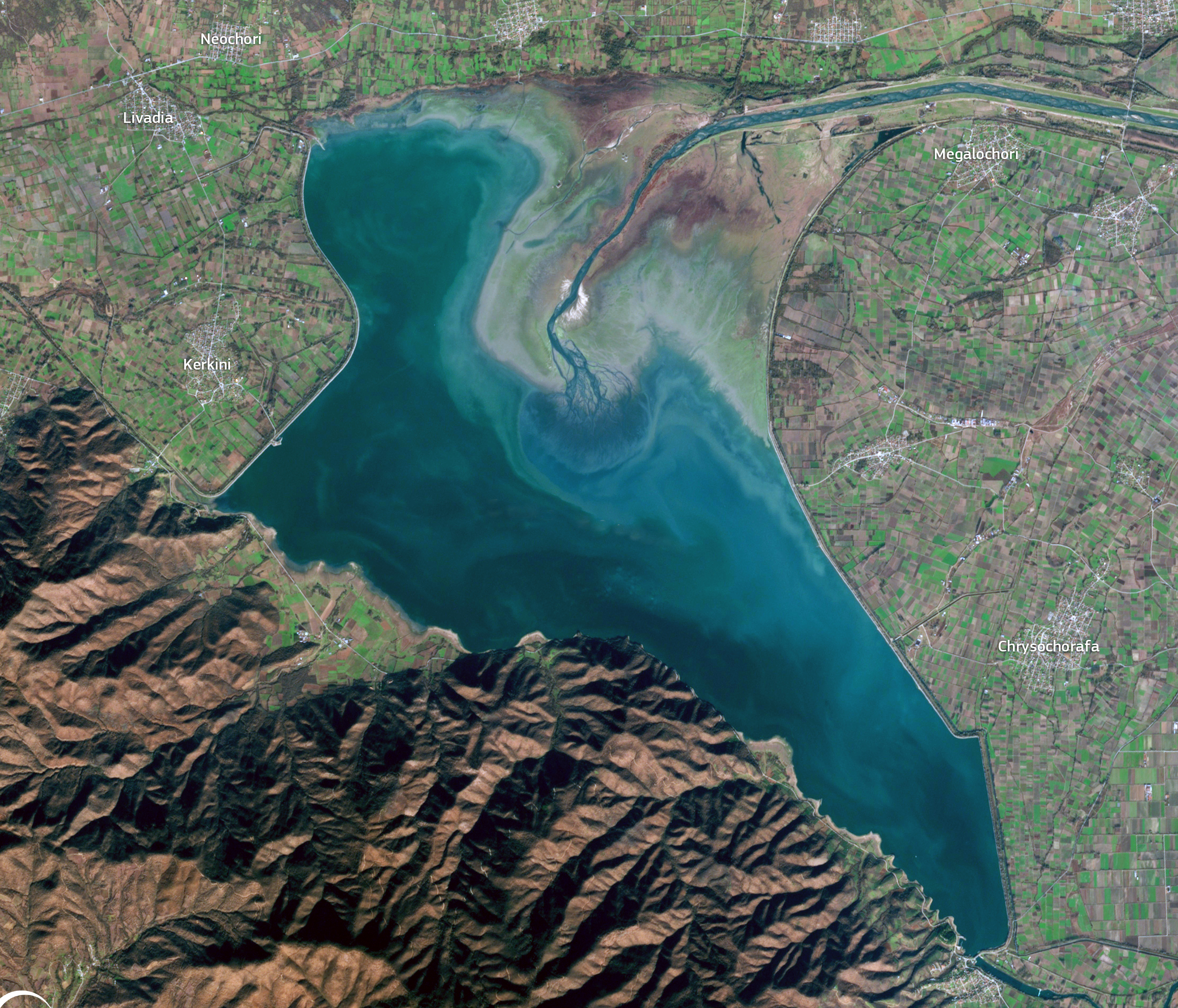
- A satellite image taken by Sentinel-2 (Jan 2023)

- Location within Greece
- Coordinates: 41.21°N 23.13°E
- Type: reservoir
- Primary inflows: Strymon River
- Primary outflows: Strymon River
- Basin countries: Greece
- Max. length: 17 kilometers (11 mi)
- Max. width: 5 kilometers (3.1 mi)
- Surface area: 75 square kilometers (29 sq mi)
- Max. depth: 35.5 m (116 ft)
- Surface elevation: 35 meters (115 ft)

Ramsar Wetland
- Official name: Artificial Lake Kerkini
- Designated: 21 August 1975
- Reference no.: 58

Lake Kerkini (Greek: Λίμνη Κερκίνη – Limni Kerkini) is an artificial reservoir on the Strymon River in Central Macedonia, Greece that was created in 1932, and redeveloped in 1980, on the site of what was previously extensive marshland and small lakes, including Lake Podkova or Butkova.

Lake Kerkini is one of the premier birdwatching sites in Greece, as it is situated along the migratory flyway for birds en route to the Aegean Sea, the Balkans, the Black Sea, the Pannonian Steppe, and beyond.

== History ==
=== Ancient ===
Some scholars identify Lake Podkova with the Lake Prasias mentioned by Herodotus; others identify it with Lake Cercinitis; see Lake Prasias for discussion.

=== Modern dam ===
Before 1932, there were irregular marsh lakes on Strymon including a lake called Подкова Podkova in South Slavic ('horseshoe'); ݒودقوه Podkova in Ottoman Turkish, and Batkova/Batkovo/Butkovo (Μπάτκοβα/Μπάτκοβο/Μπούτκοβο) in Greek.

Kerkini lake was created by embankments on the eastern and western banks of the river and a dam near the village of Lithotopos, which entered service in 1932.

Over time, the lake's capacity was reduced from silt deposits, so the embankments were raised and a new dam built, entering service in 1982.

== Geography ==
The lake's main water source is the Strymon River, although it is also fed by the Kerkinitis river from Krousia.

The lake's surrounding area is flat and semi-mountainous. The lake's size varies from 54 km^{2} to 72 km^{2}.

The lake provides agricultural utility and provides a hydrobiosphere for thousands of water fowls.

== Nature ==
This biosphere is recouped by the International Convention of Ramsar. Thousands of birds, both rare and protected, riverside forests, water-lilies in a large area, fish variety and panoramic view from the mountains of Belasica and Krousia give it a characteristic tone. The lake hosts 227 kinds of birds, especially non-migrants, of which 76 are recorded in the National Red Catalogue, while at least 31 of them are protected by EEC's Directive concerning wild life. There are also buffalo herds in the area, as well as jackelo. In the surroundings, there are at least 10 amphibian species (frogs, salamanders, newts), five snail species, 19 reptile species (lizards, snakes, turtles) and a great variety of insects which play an important part in the food chain and contribute towards the biological resources of the lake.

== Gallery ==
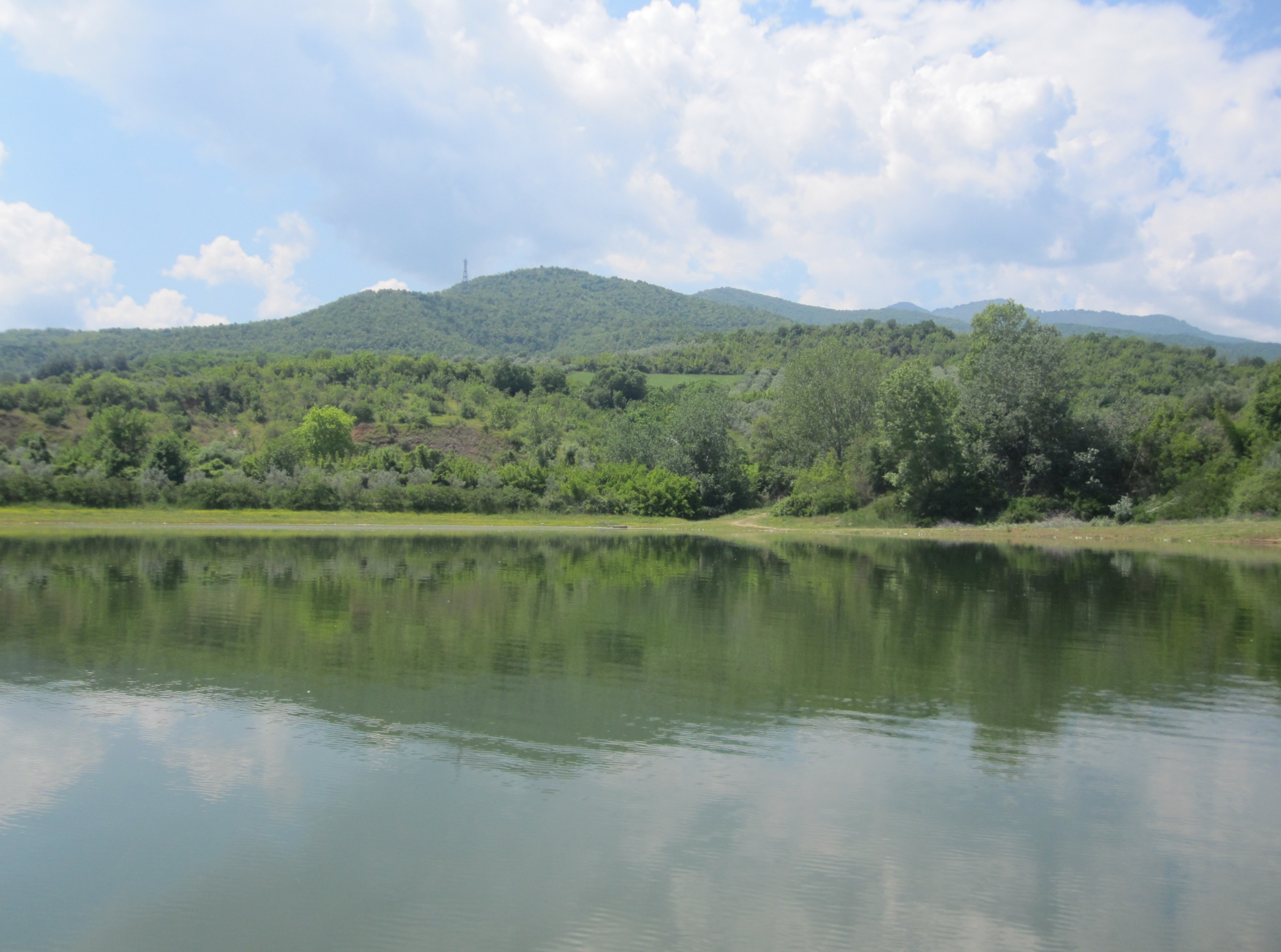
Krousia mount from the lake

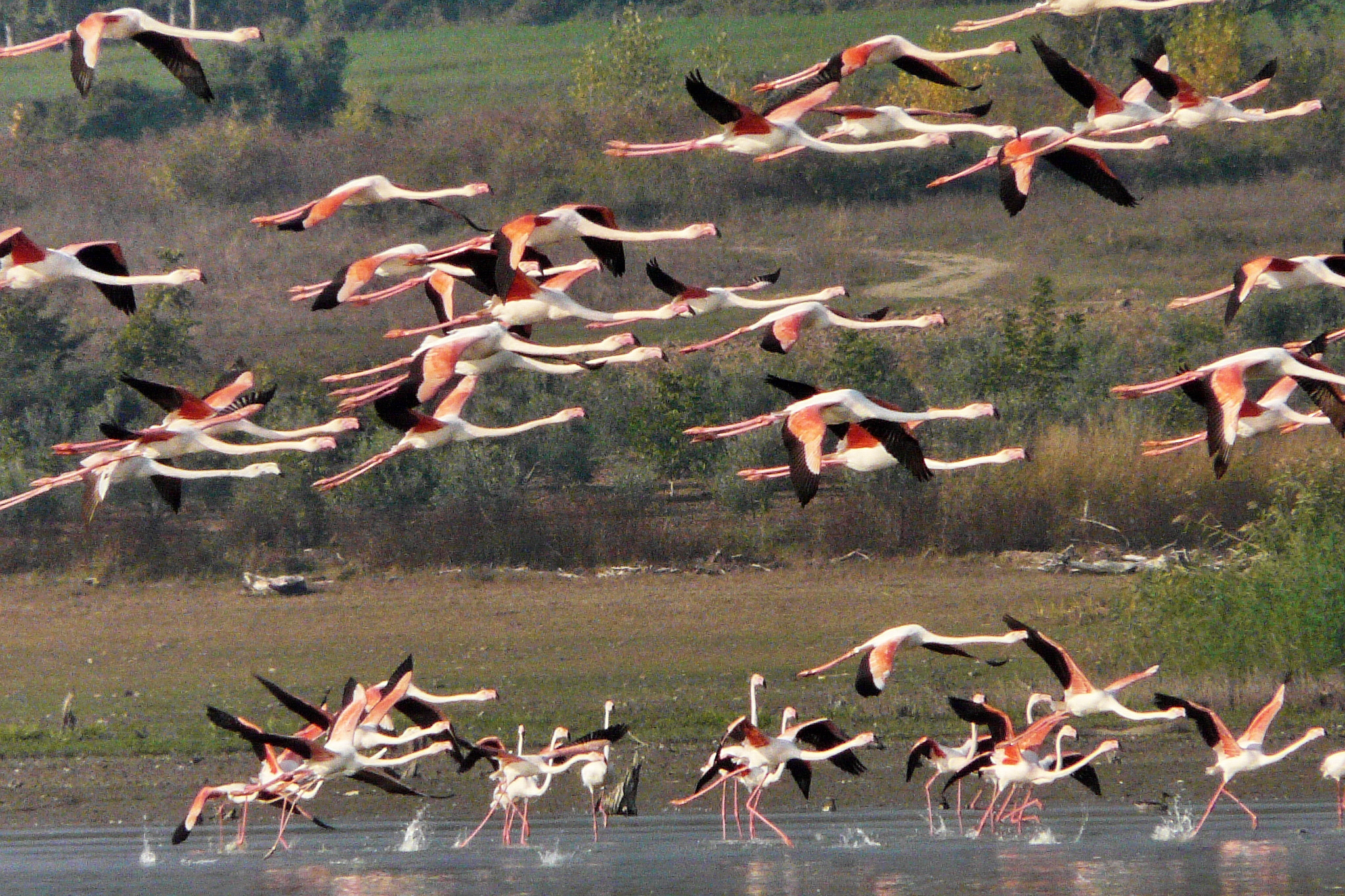
Flamingos in the lake

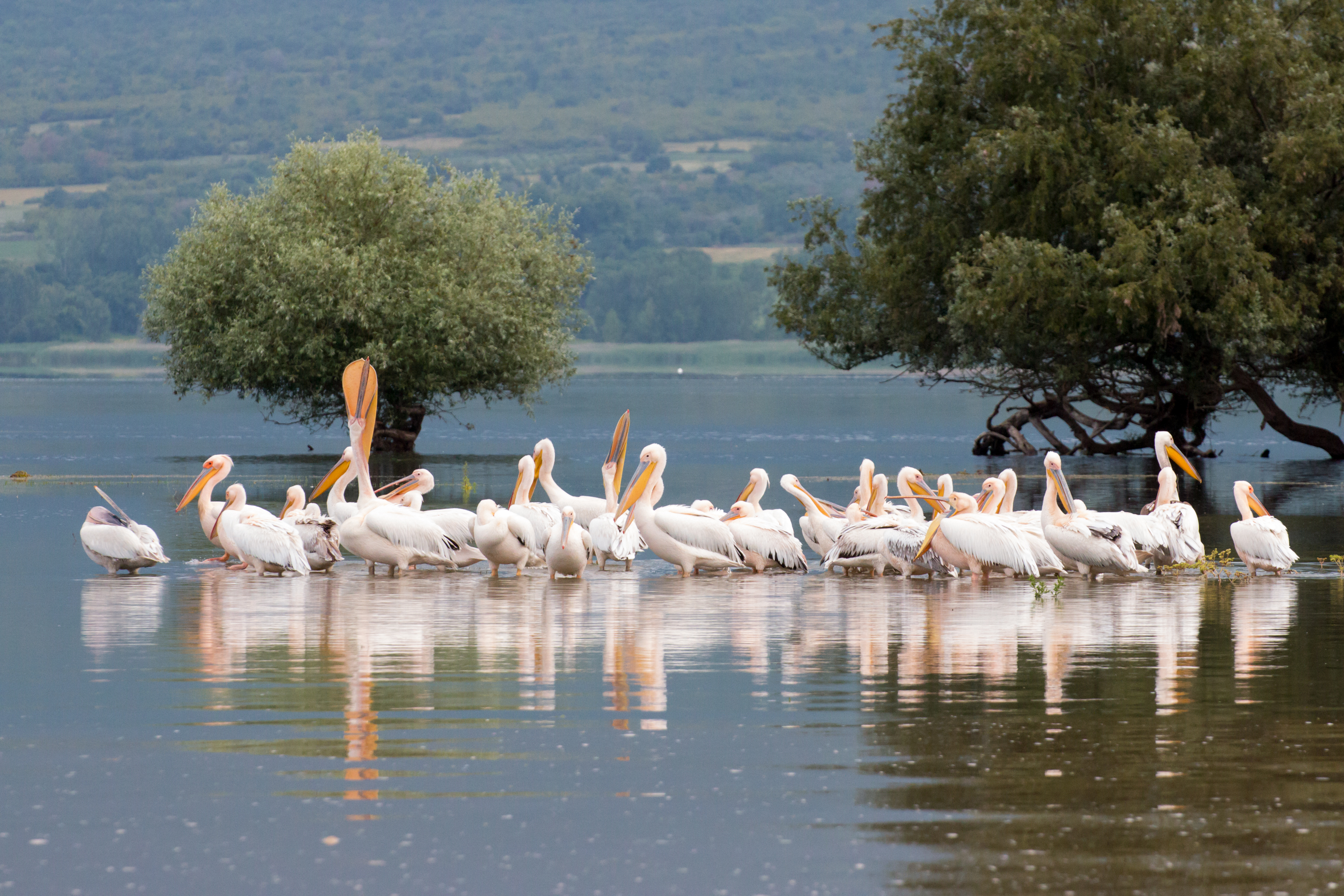
White pelicans at the lake

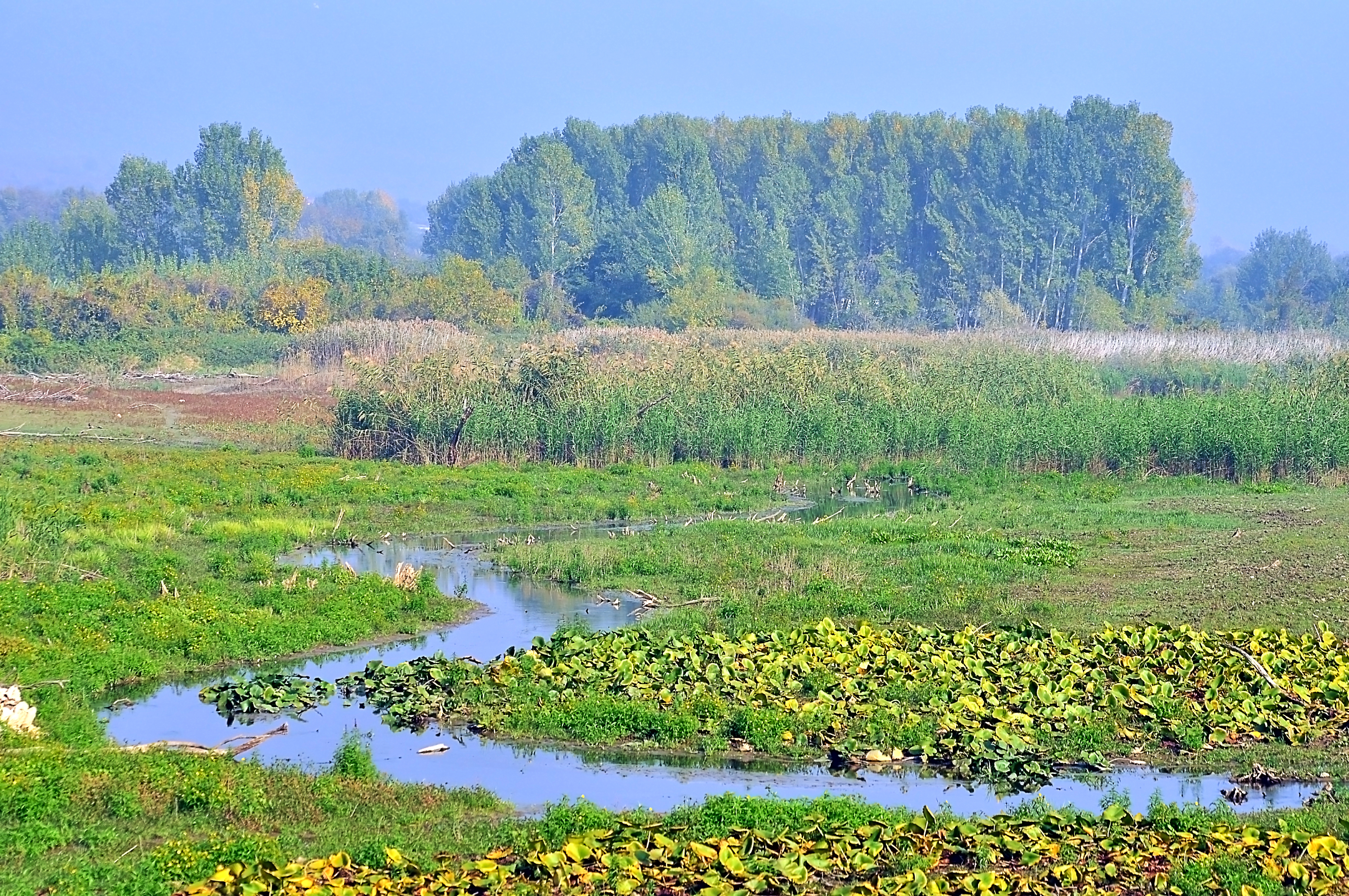
Landscape

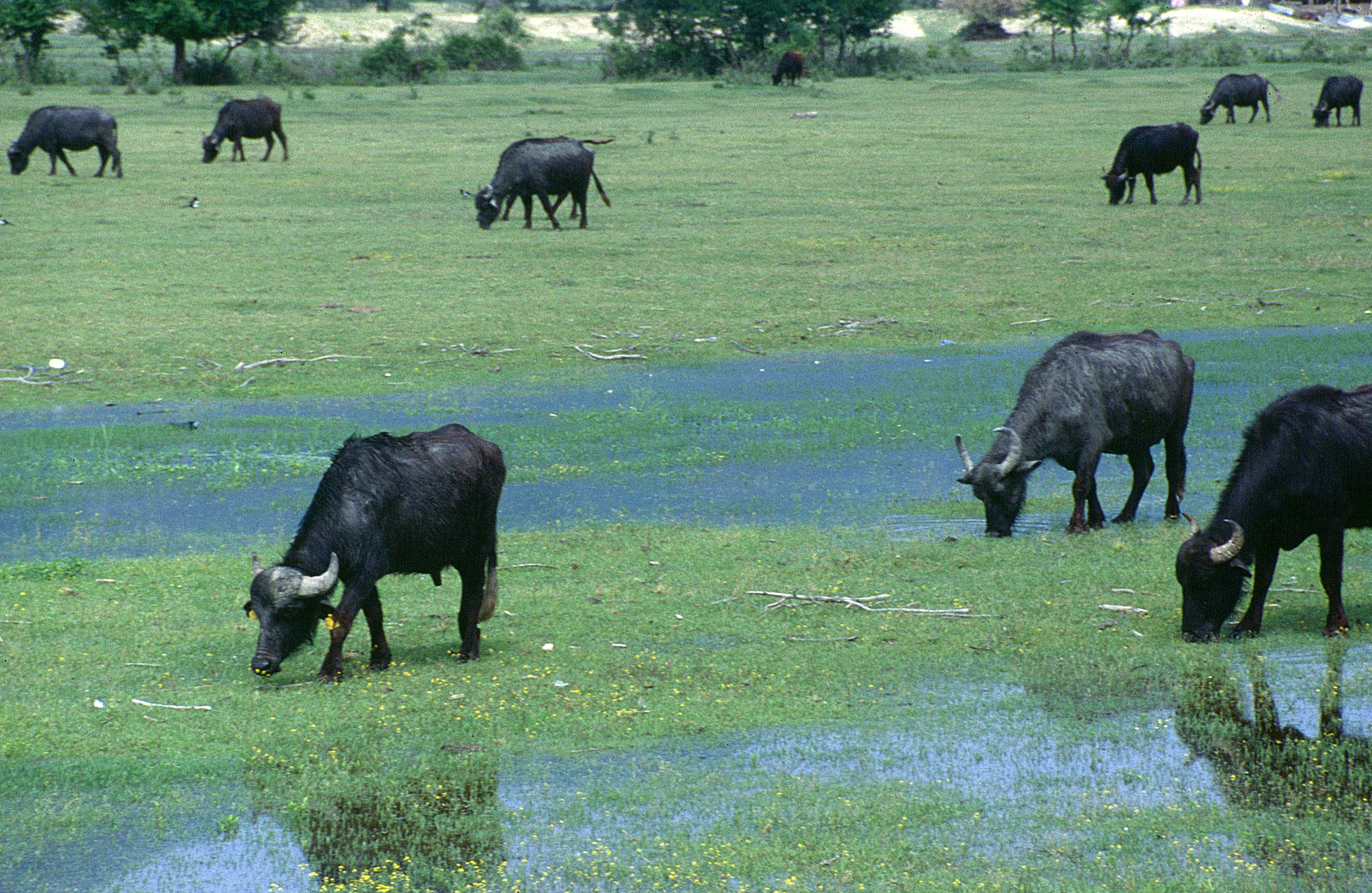
Buffalos at the lake

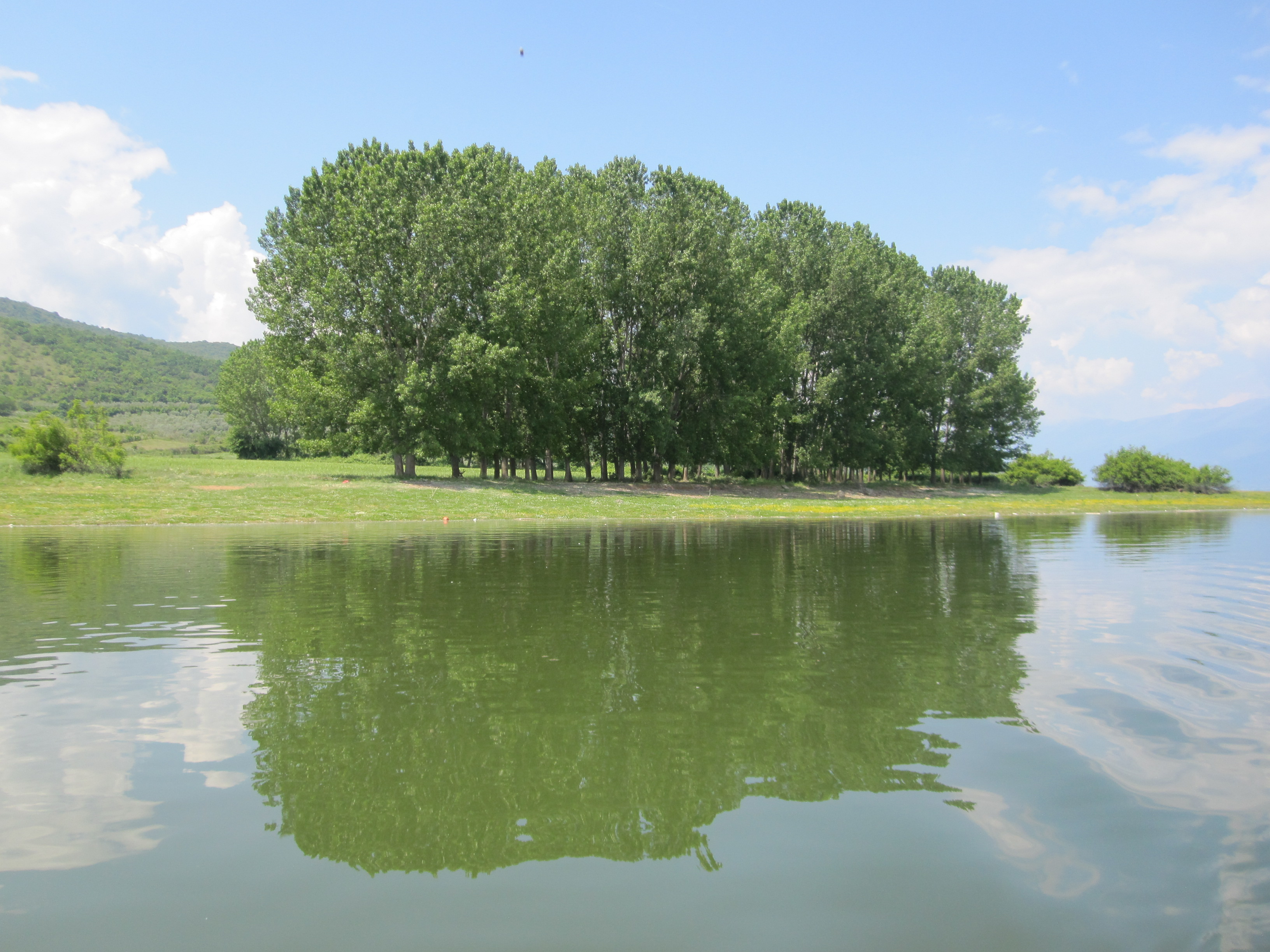
View

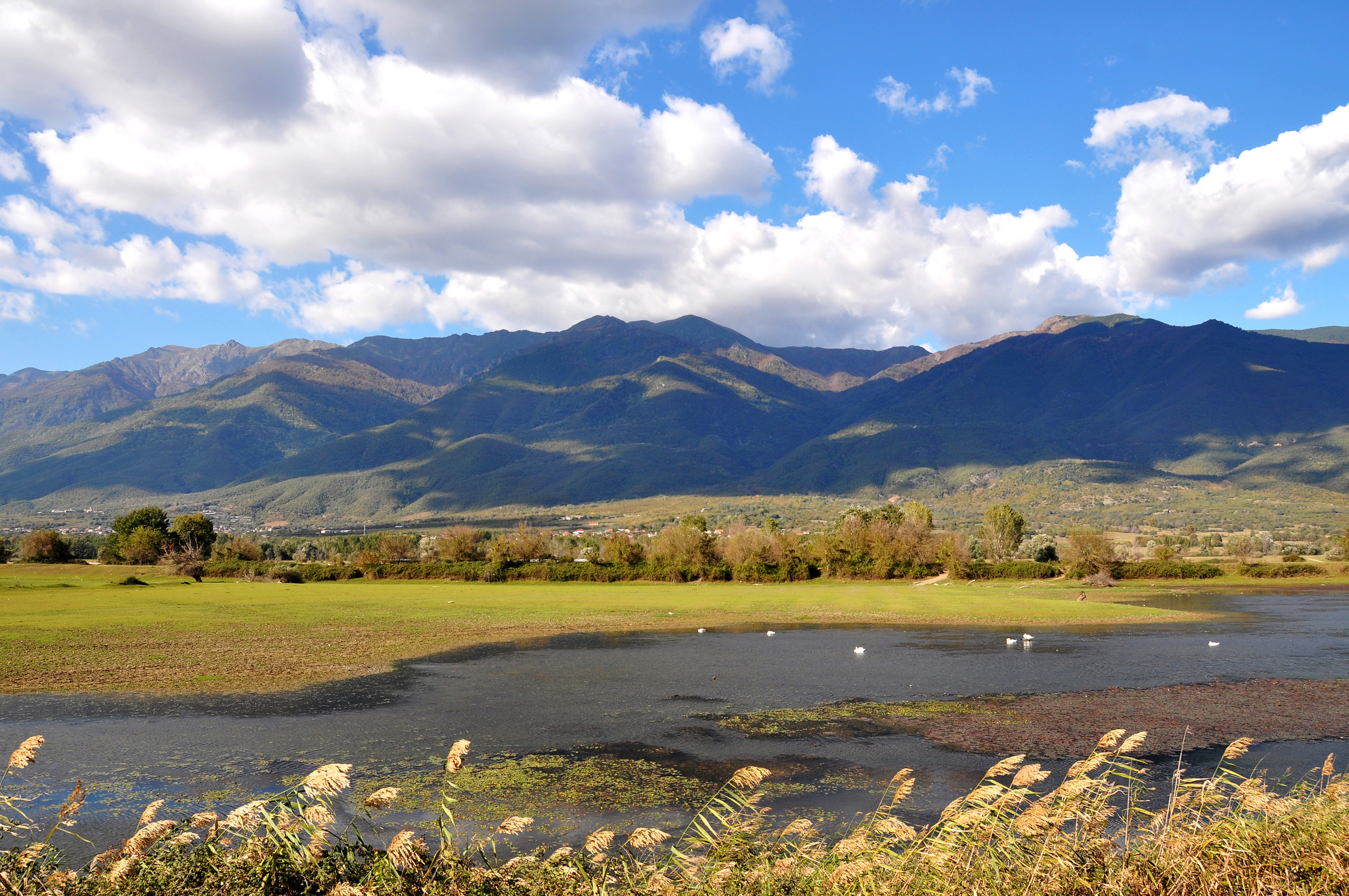
View

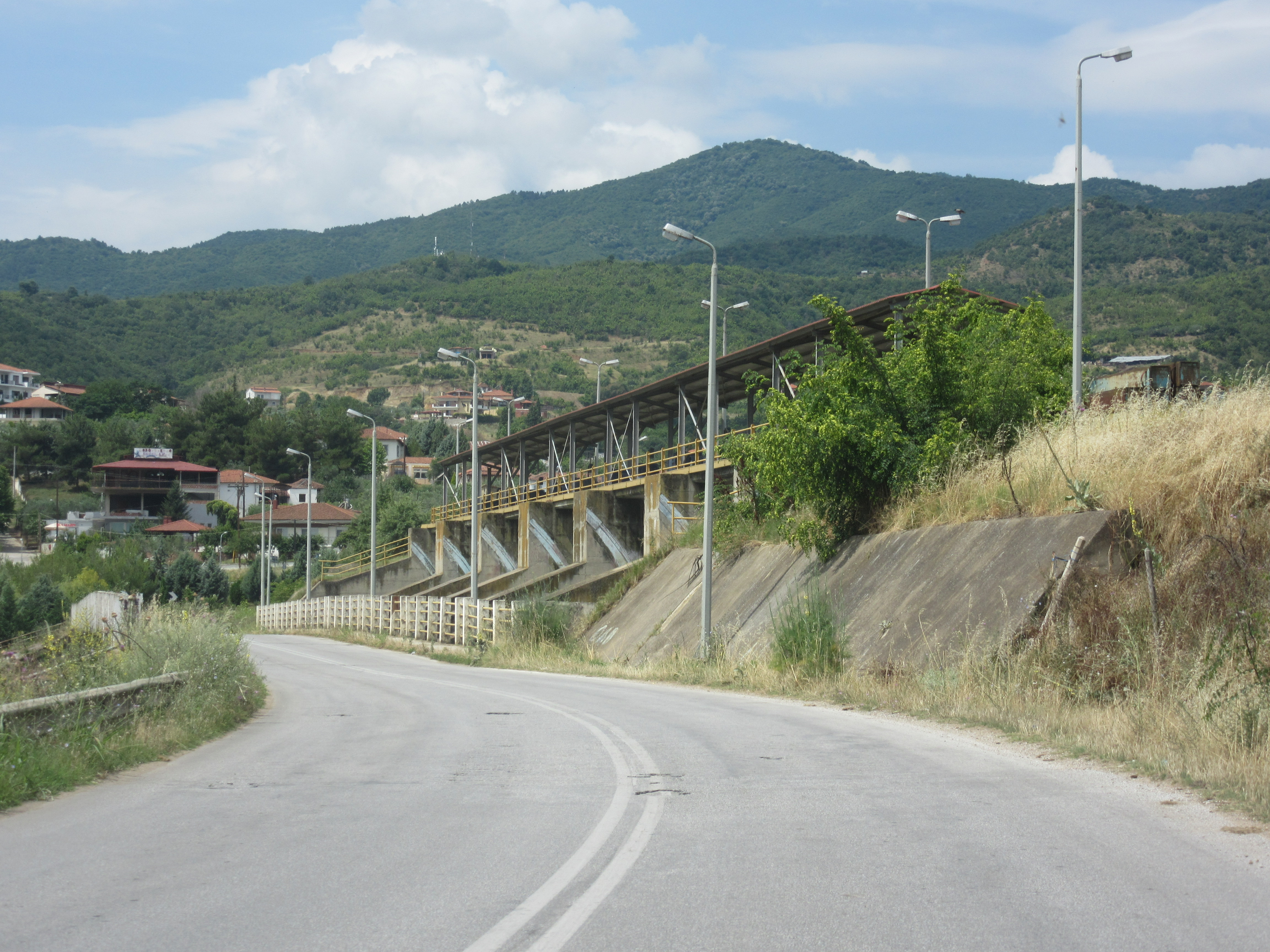
The dam of Lake Kerkini

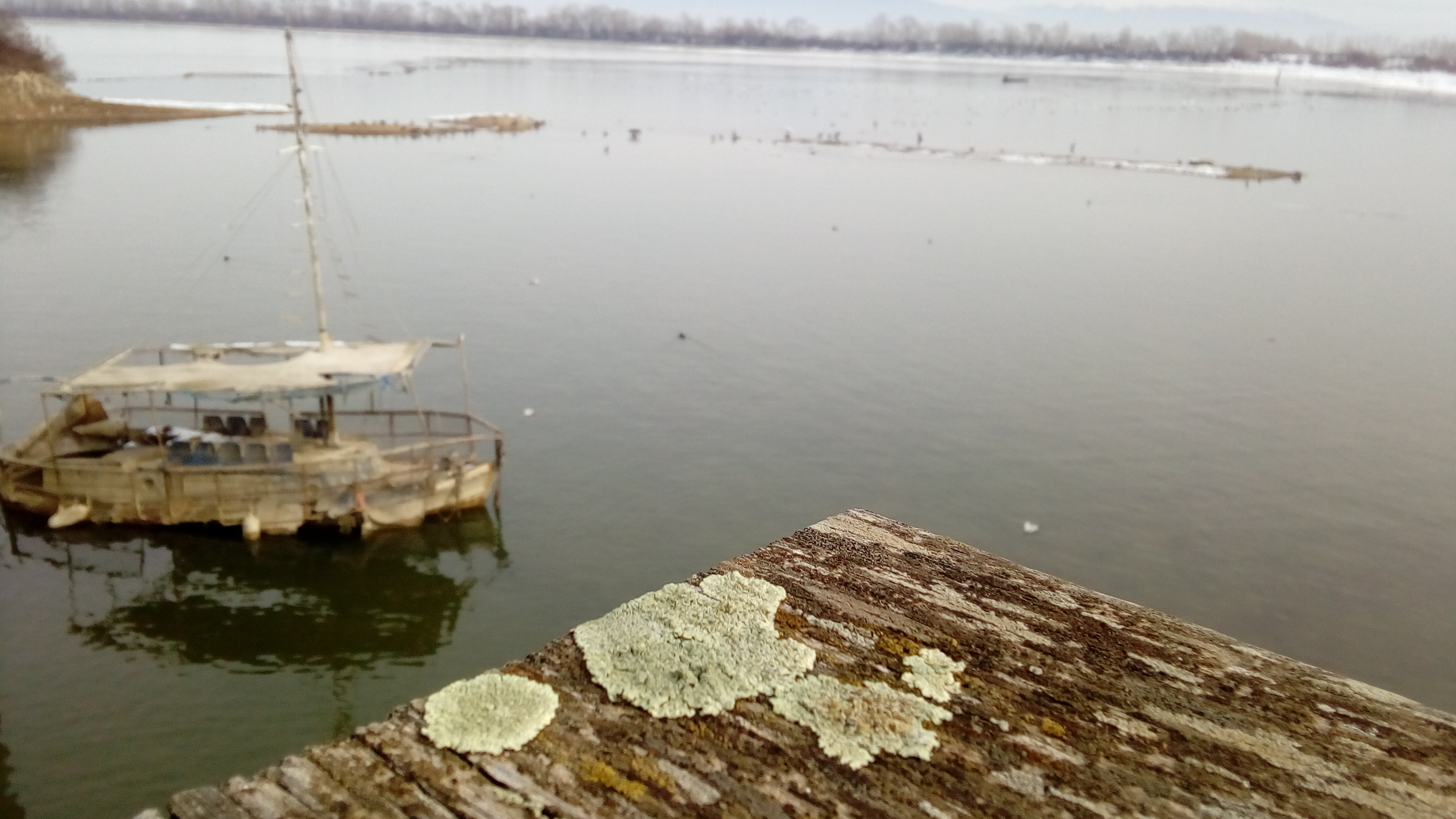
Small boat on the lake
