= Struma (river) =

River in Bulgaria and Greece

Struma (Струма), Strymónas (Στρυμόνας)
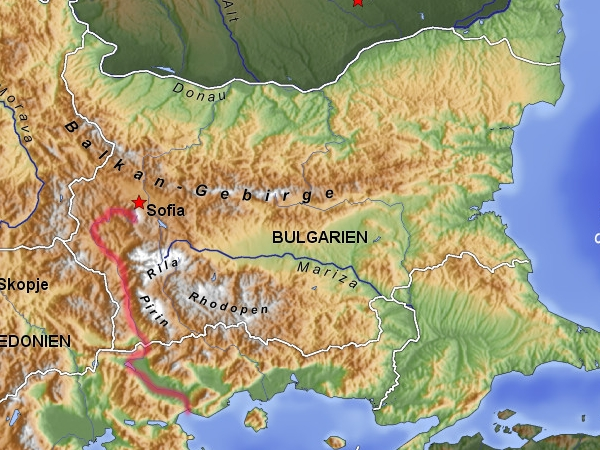
- The course of the Struma in Bulgaria and Greece (marked in red)

Location
- Countries: Bulgaria and Greece

Physical characteristics
- Source
  - location: The south slopes of Vitosha, Bulgaria
  - elevation: 2,180 m (7,150 ft)
- Mouth
  - location: North Aegean Sea, Greece
  - coordinates: 40°47′9″N 23°50′56″E
- Length: 415 km (258 mi)
- Basin size: 17,330 km^{2} (6,690 sq mi)
- Discharge
  - average: 2.1 m^{3}/s (74 cu ft/s) at Pernik; 76.2 m^{3}/s (2,690 cu ft/s) at Marino pole

The Struma or Strymonas (Bulgarian: Струма, romanized: Struma, pronounced [ˈstrumɐ]; Greek: Στρυμόνας, romanized: Strymónas, pronounced [striˈmonas]) is a river in Bulgaria and Greece. Its ancient name was Strymon (Greek: Στρυμών, romanized: Strymṓn, pronounced [stryˈmɔːn]). Its drainage area is 17,330 km^{2} (6,690 sq mi), of which 8,670 km^{2} (3,350 sq mi) in Bulgaria, 6,295 km^{2} (2,431 sq mi) in Greece and the remaining 2,365 km^{2} (913 sq mi) in North Macedonia and Serbia. It takes its source from the Vitosha Mountain in Bulgaria, runs first westward, then southward, forming a number of gorges, enters Greece near the village of Promachonas in eastern Macedonia. In Greece it is the main waterway feeding and exiting from Lake Kerkini, a significant centre for migratory wildfowl. Also in Greece, the river entirely flows in the Serres regional unit into the Strymonian Gulf in Aegean Sea, near Amphipolis. The river's length is 415 kilometres (258 miles) (of which 290 kilometres (180 mi) in Bulgaria, making it the country's fifth-longest and one of the longest rivers that run solely in the interior of the Balkans.

Parts of the river valley belong to a Bulgarian coal-producing area, more significant in the past than nowadays; the southern part of the Bulgarian section is an important wine region. The Greek portion is a valley which is dominant in agriculture, being Greece's fourth-biggest valley. The tributaries include the Konska River, the Dragovishtitsa, the Rilska River, the Blagoevgradska Bistritsa, the Sandanska Bistritsa, the Strumitsa, the Pirinska Bistritsa and the Angitis.

== Etymology ==
The river's name comes from Thracian Strymón, derived from Proto-Indo-European *srew- 'stream', akin to English stream, Old Irish sruaimm 'river', Polish strumień 'stream', Lithuanian straumuo 'fast stream', Bulgarian струя (struia) 'water flow', Greek ῥεῦμα (rheũma) 'stream', Albanian rrymë 'water flow', shi 'rain'.

The name Strymón was a hydronym in ancient Greek mythology, referring to a mythical Thracian king that was drowned in the river. Strymón was also used as a personal name in various regions of Ancient Greece during the 3rd century BC.

In Bulgarian it is called Струма [ˈstrumɐ]; while in Turkish: Karasu [kaɾaˈsu], 'black water').

== History ==
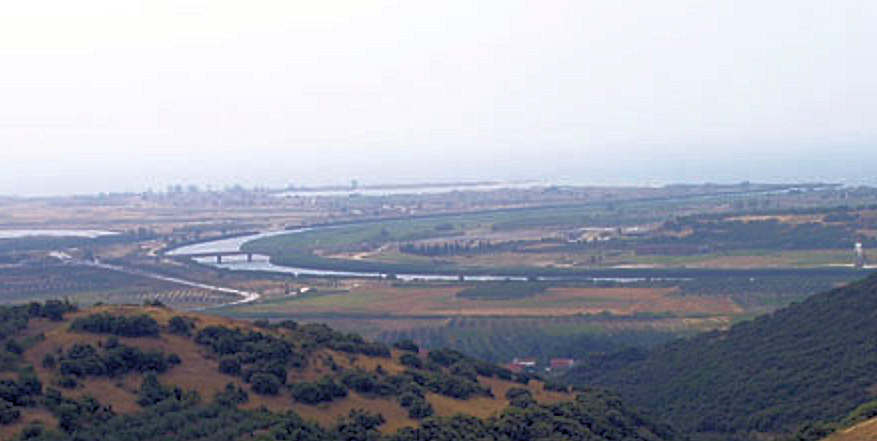
View near the Greek coast

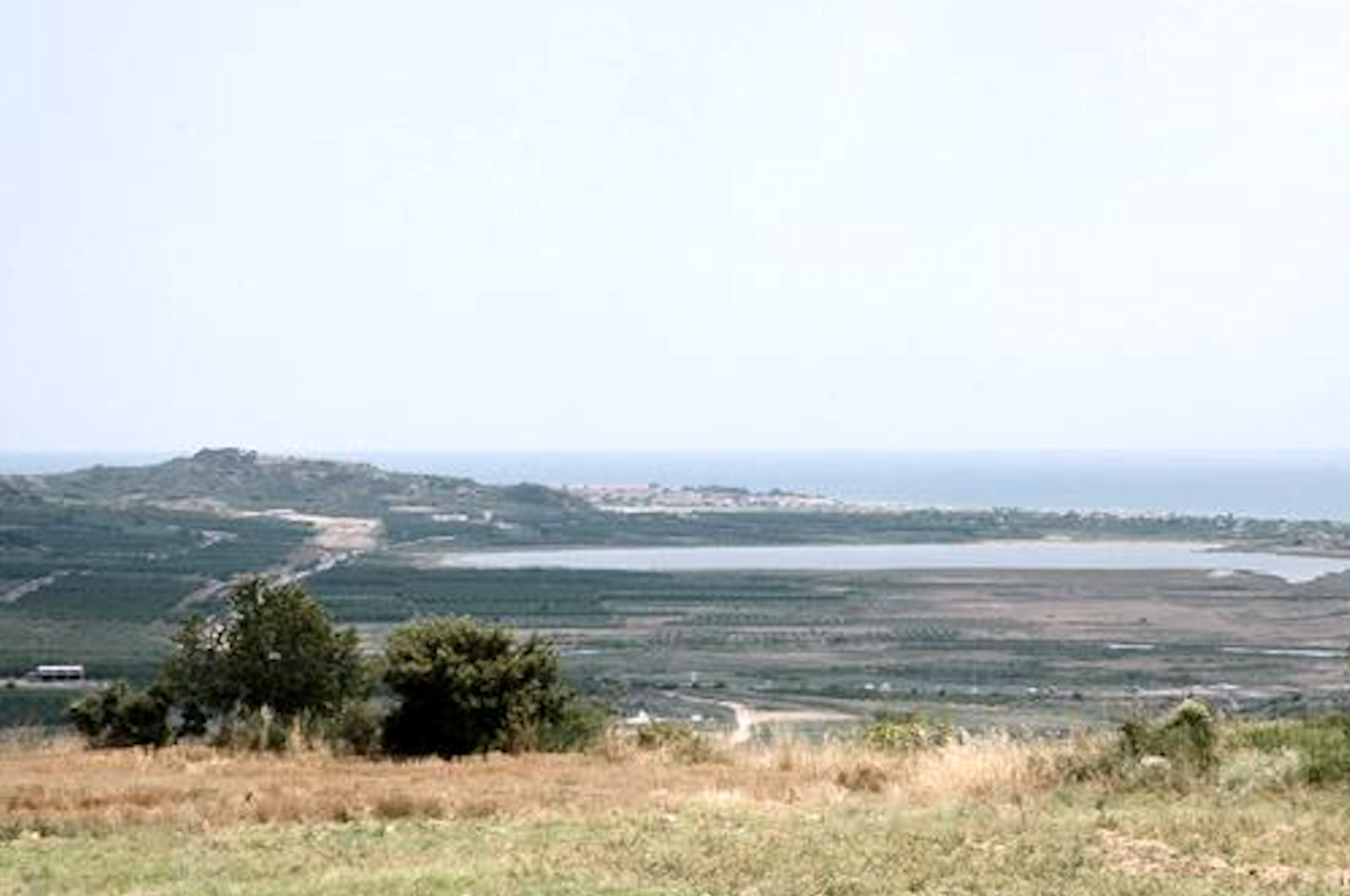
The ancient Persian fort at Eion (left) and the mouth of the Strymon River (right), seen from Ennea Hodoi (Amphipolis)

In 437 BC, the ancient Greek city of Amphipolis was founded near the river's entrance to the Aegean, at the site previously known as Ennea Hodoi ('Nine roads'). When Xerxes I of Persia crossed the river during his invasion in 480 BC he buried alive nine young boys and nine maidens as a sacrifice to the river god. The forces of Alexander I of Macedon defeated the remnants of Xerxes' army near Ennea Hodoi in 479 BC. In 424 BC the Spartan general Brasidas after crossing the entire Greek peninsula sieged and conquered Amphipolis. According to the ancient sources, the river was navigable from its mouth up to the ancient (and today dried) Cercinitis lake, which also favored the navigation; and thus was formed in antiquity an important waterway that served the communication between the coasts of Strymonian Gulf and the Thracian hinterland and almost to the city of Serres.

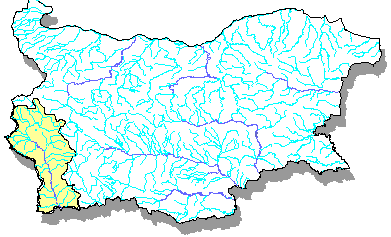
The basin of the river in Bulgaria

The decisive Battle of Kleidion was fought close the river in 1014 between the Bulgarians under Emperor Samuel and the Byzantines under Emperor Basil II and determined the fall of the First Bulgarian Empire four years later. In 1913, the Greek Army was nearly surrounded in the Kresna Gorge of the Struma by the Bulgarian Army during the Second Balkan War, and the Greeks were forced to ask for armistice.

The river valley was part of the Macedonian front in World War I. The ship Struma, which took Jewish refugees out of Romania in World War II and was torpedoed and sunk in the Black Sea, causing nearly 800 deaths, was named after the river.

== Protected areas and ecology ==
The river's mouth and Lake Kerkini, a lake that the river is feeding and exiting, are both national parks and part of the Natura 2000 network. More than 300 bird species have been observed at these locations and some of them are considered endangered or vulnerable, like the saker falcon, the eastern imperial eagle and the greater spotted eagle. The Greek lamprey, which is listed as a critically endangered species on the IUCN Red List and is considered the rarest species of lamprey in the world, is only found at the Struma basin and the basin of the much smaller Louros river.

== Gallery ==
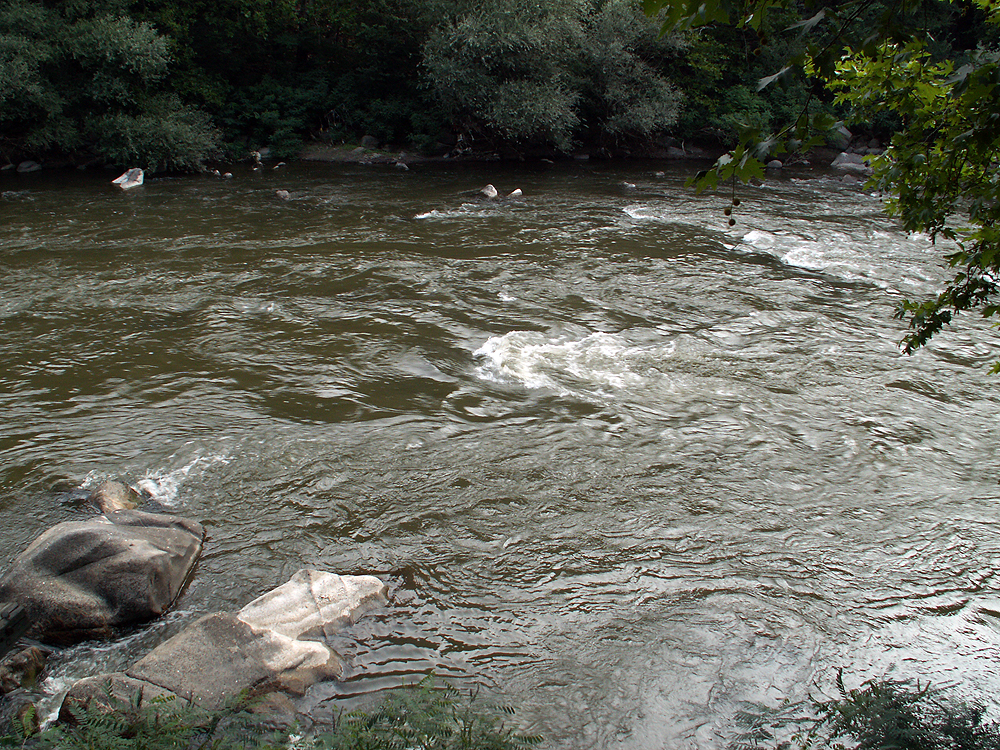
Struma at Kresna Gorge

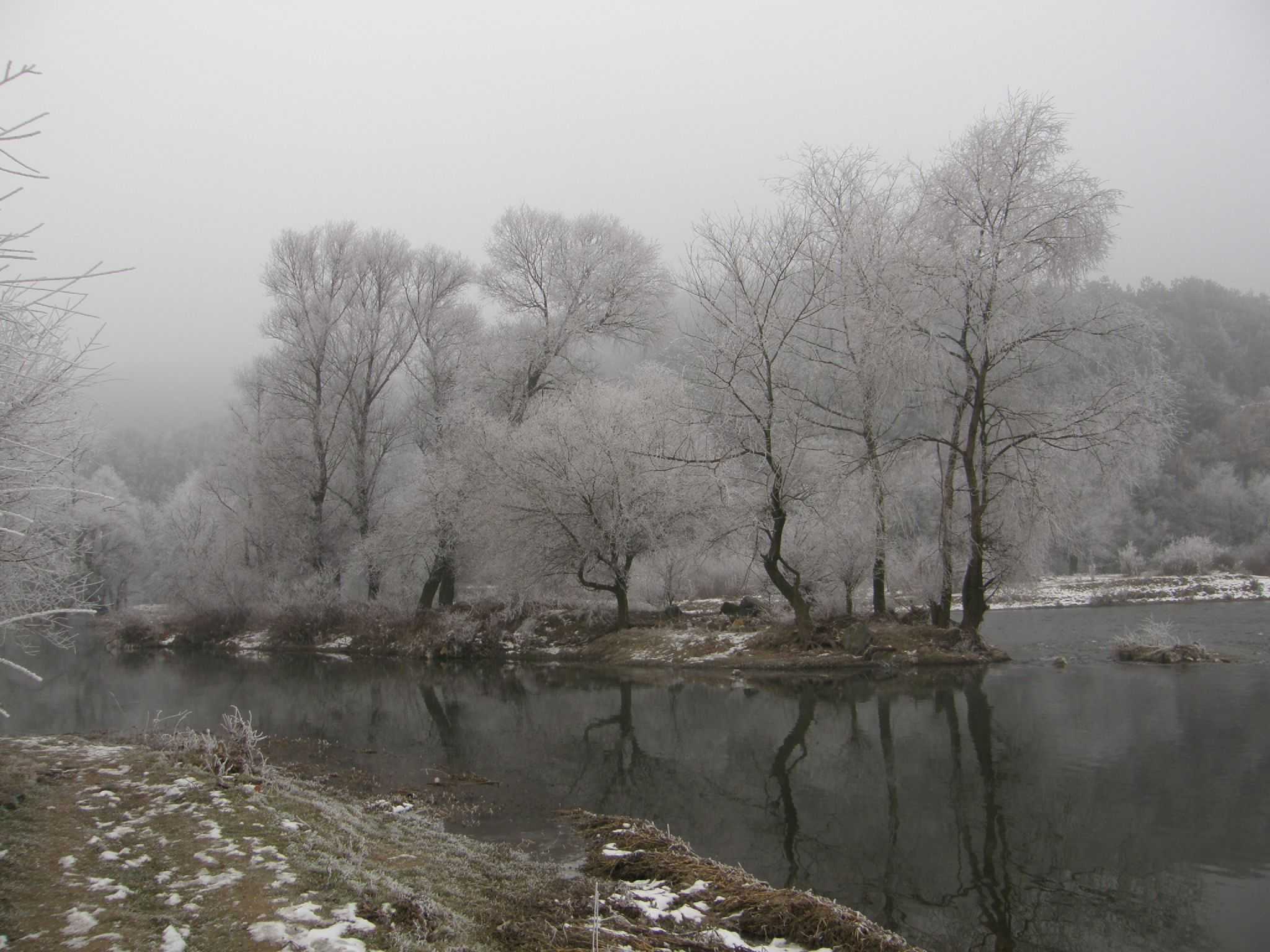
Struma near the city of Blagoevgrad in winter

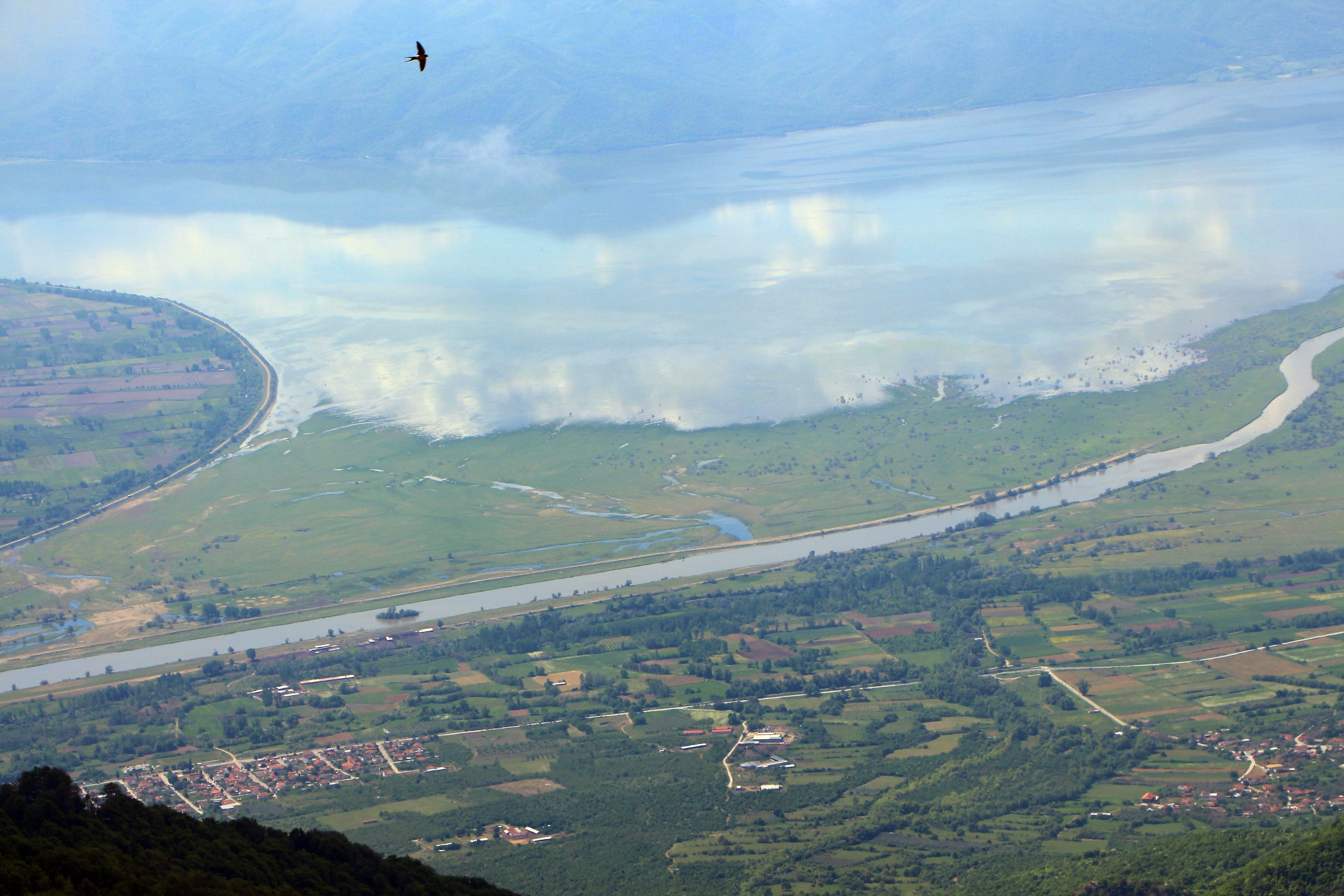
Strymon estuary

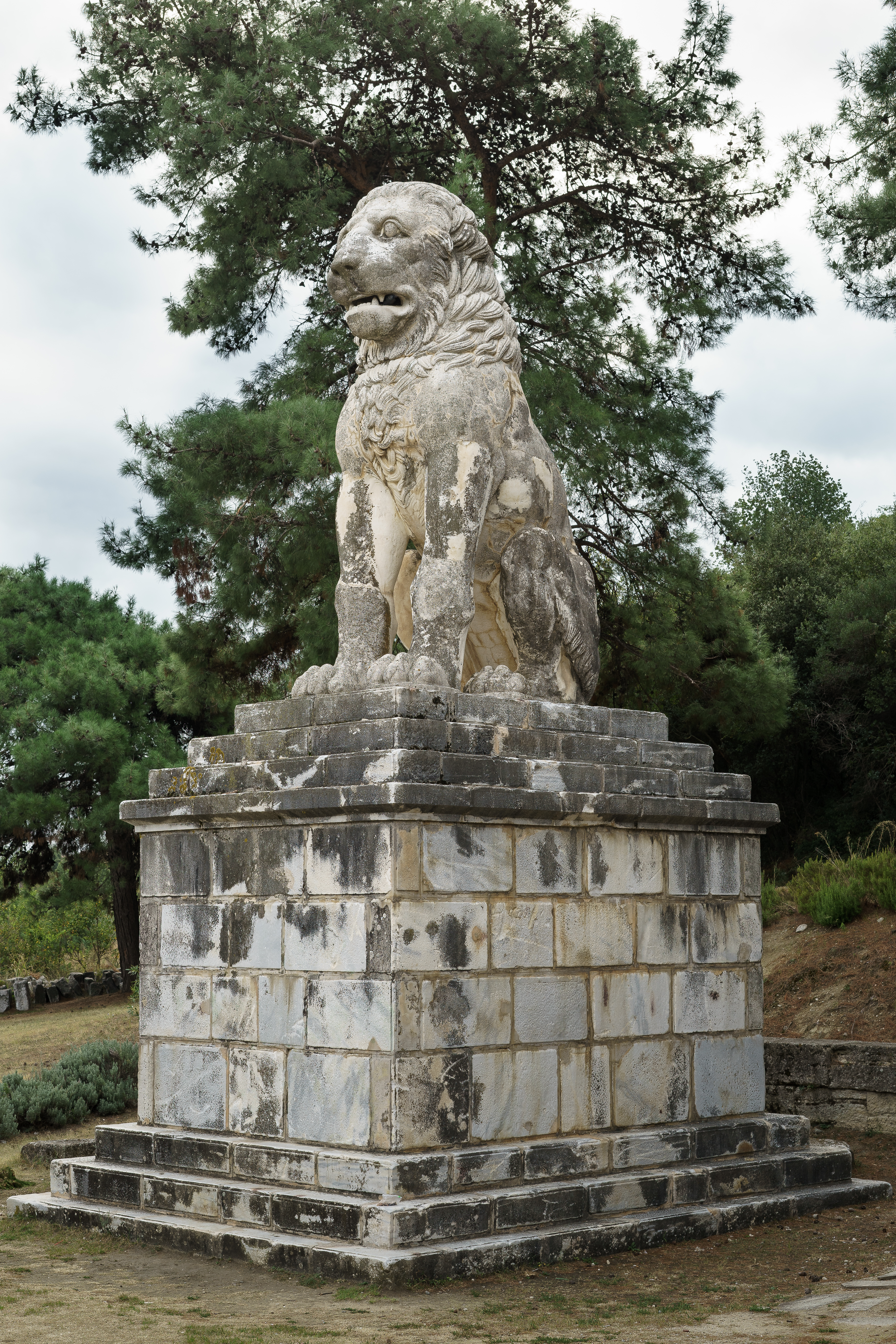
Lion of Amphipolis; Via Egnatia, west side of Strymonas

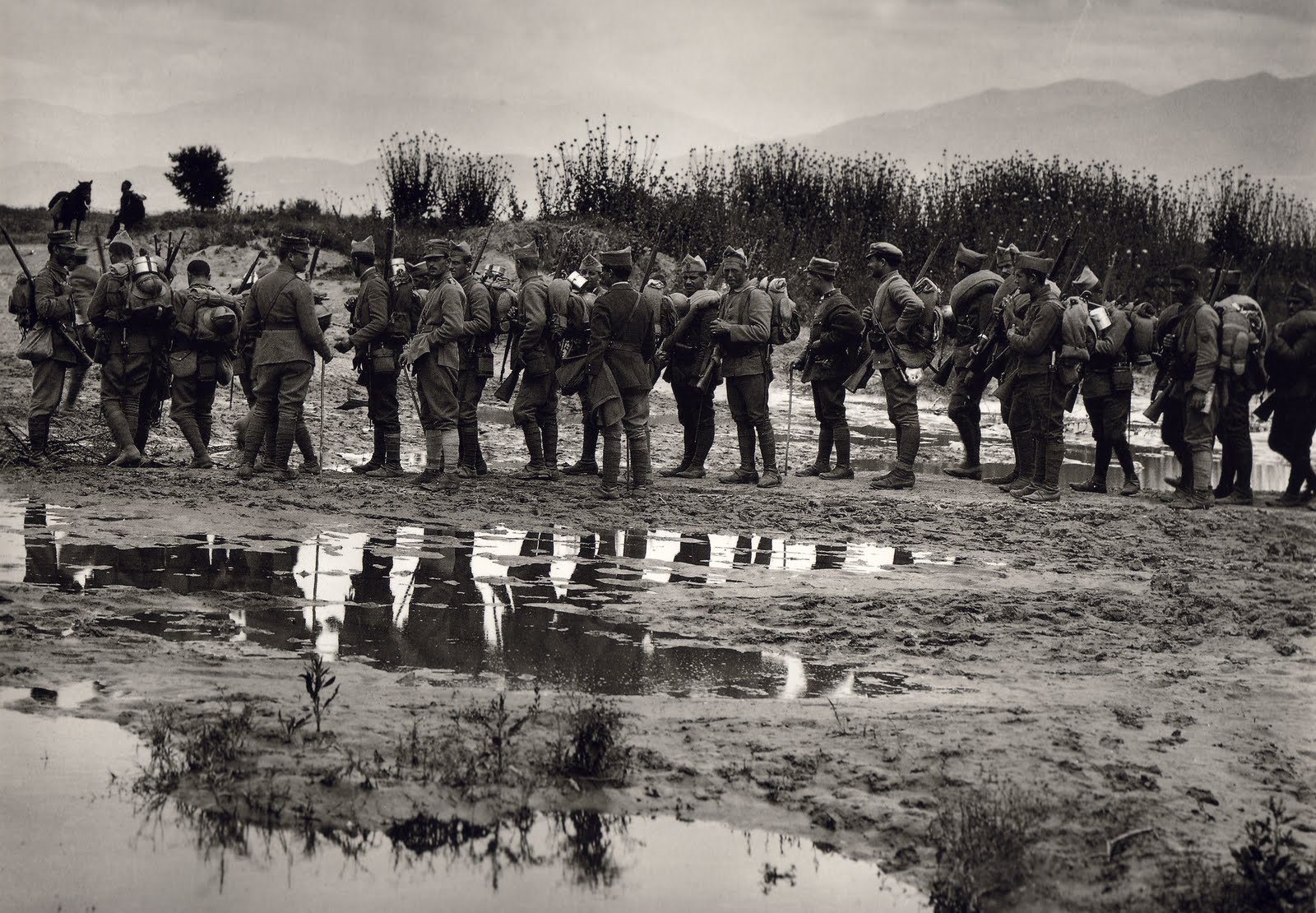
Greek soldiers at Strymon during WWI

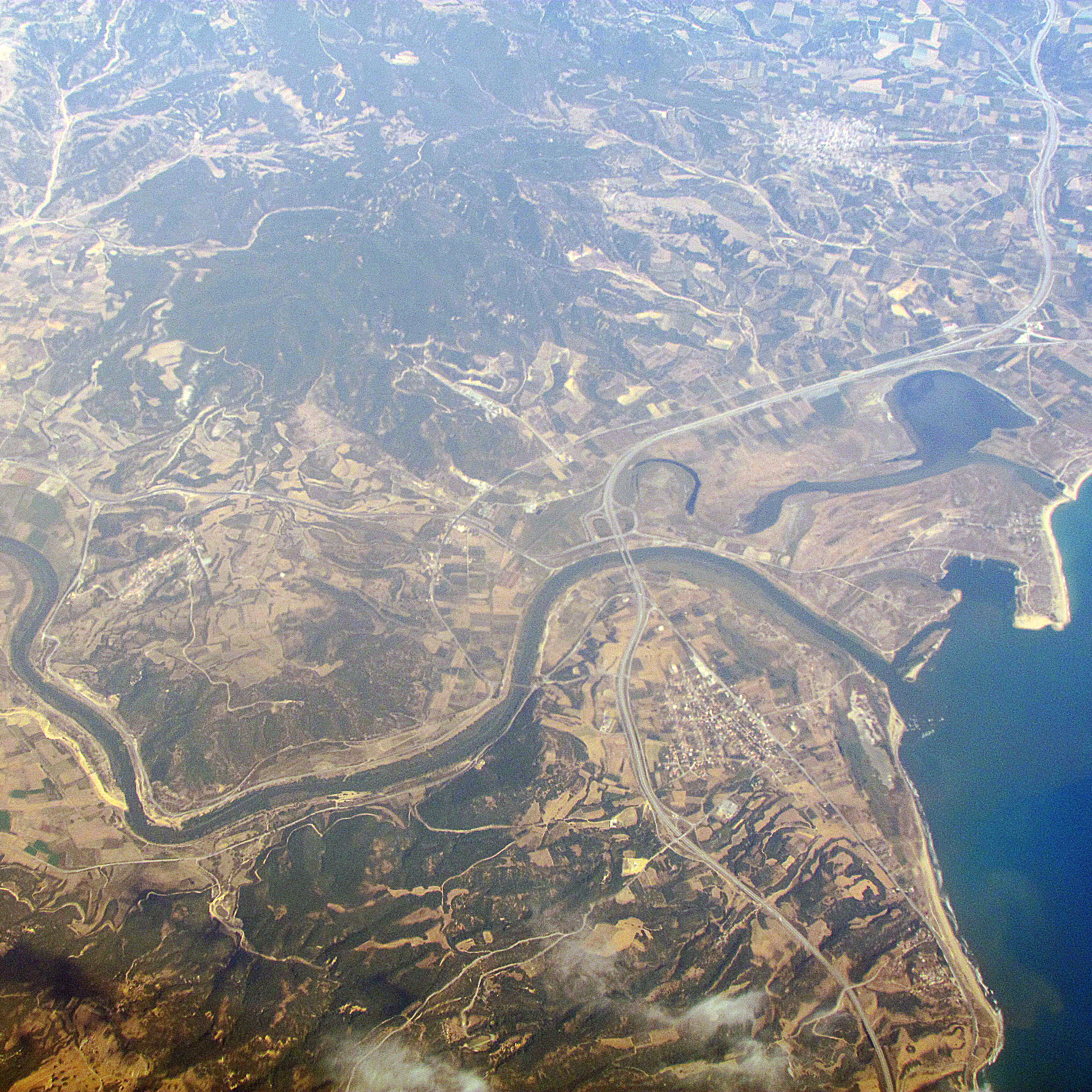
Struma river mouth

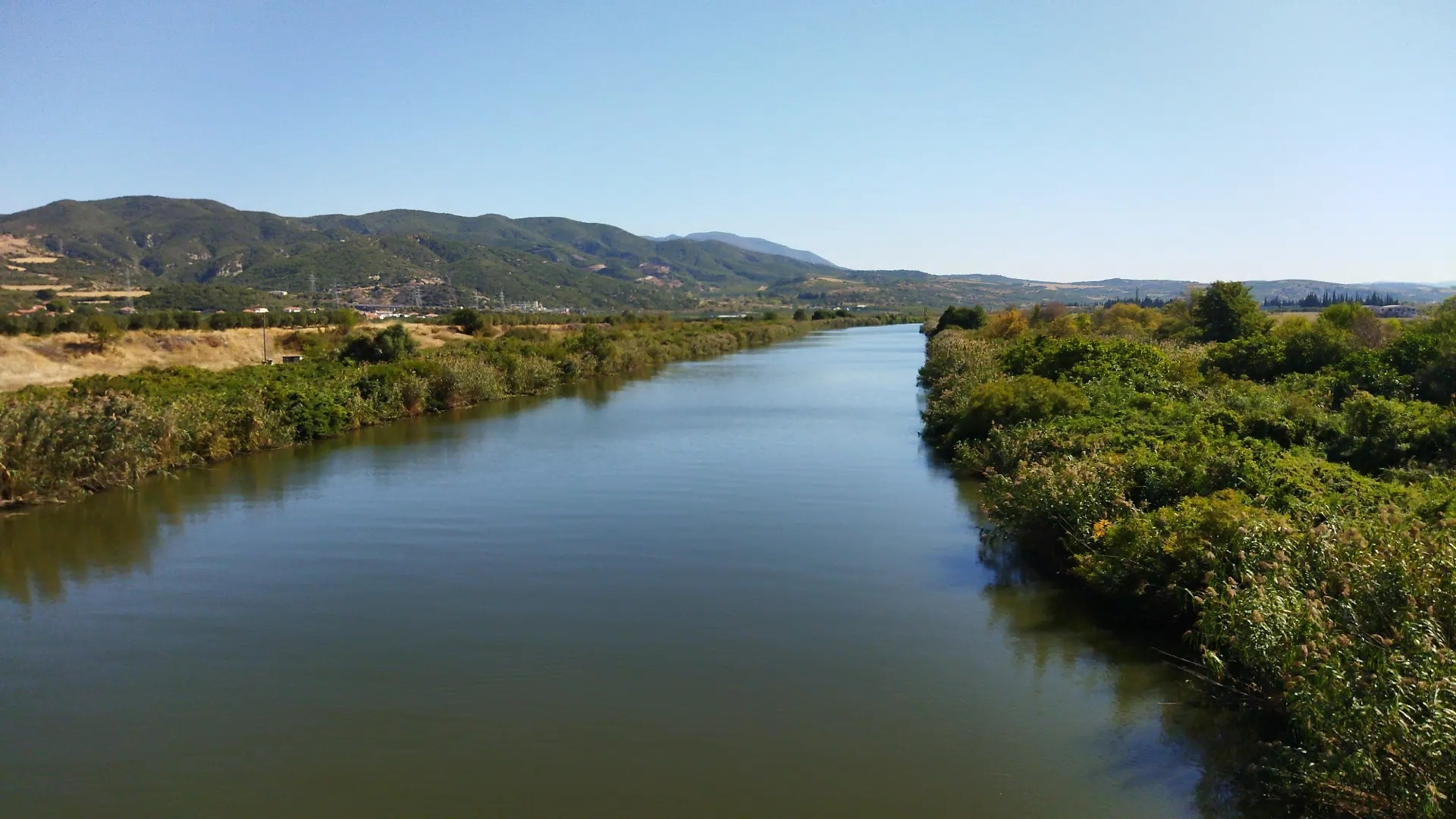
Struma river from the bridge next to the Lion of Amphipolis facing the beach of Ofryni Beach (Tuzla)

== Honour ==
- Struma Glacier on Livingston Island in the South Shetland Islands, Antarctica is named after Struma River.
