= Ariadaeus =

Ariadaeus may refer to:

- Philip III of Macedon (359 BC – 317 BC), king of Macedonia
- Rima Ariadaeus, a linear rille on the Moon
- Ariadaeus (crater), a crater on the Moon
