= Ceremonial shield from the Tombs of Vergina =

Ceremonial shield from ancient Aegae, Macedonia

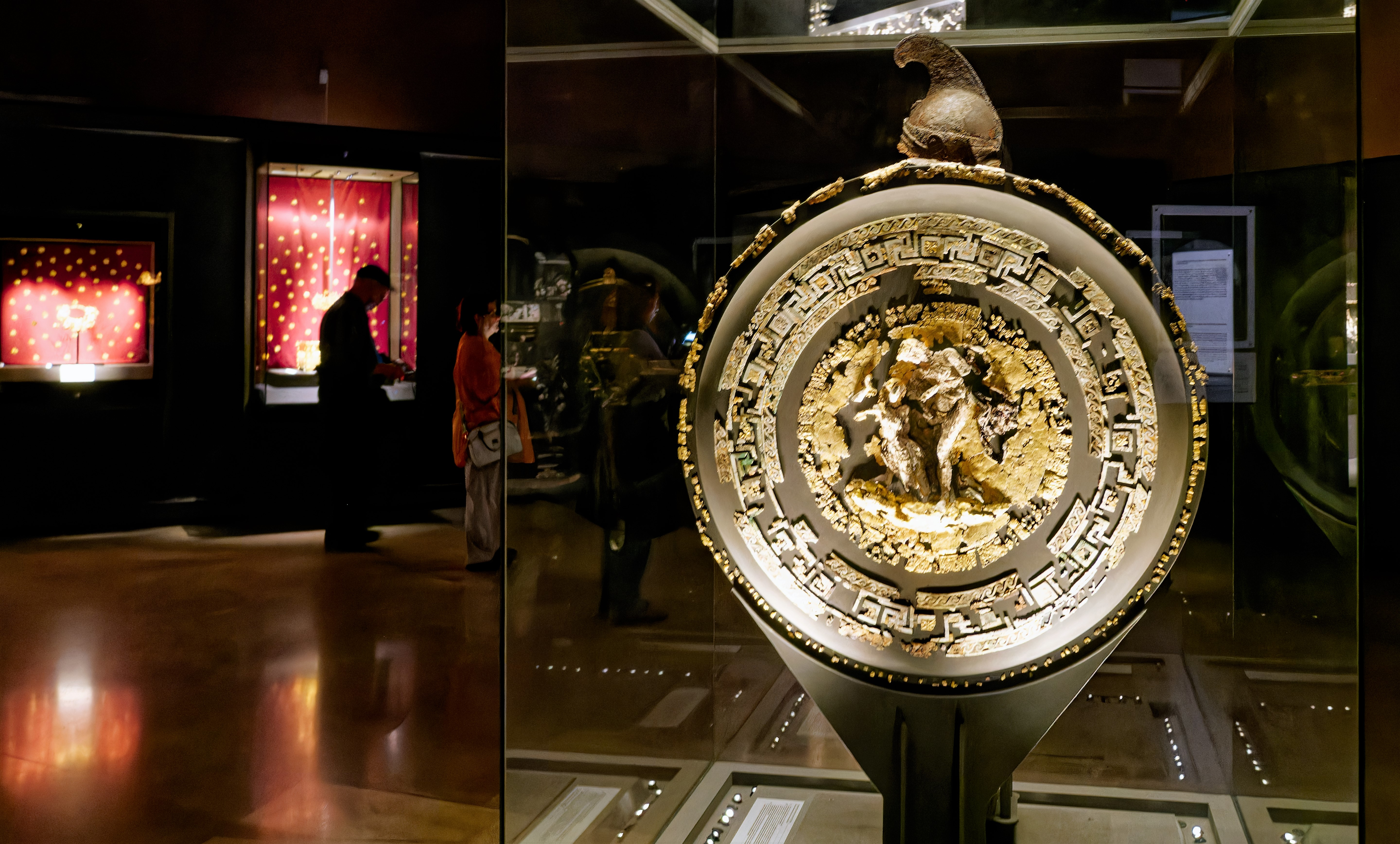
The ceremonial shield in display at the Museum of the Royal Tombs of Aigai, Greece.

The ceremonial shield of the Tombs of Vergina is a decorative shield found in the Royal Tombs at Aigai (now known as Vergina) in Northeastern Greece. The shield was found alongside other lavish grave goods and the remains of family members of Alexander the Great, including Philip II of Macedon. The ceremonial shield dates to the late fourth century B.C.E. and was discovered in 1976.

== Background ==
Aigai served as the capital of Macedon until the fifth century BCE, when the capital was moved to Pella. After this move the area was still used as a burial site for elite and royal families. The shield was discovered in the second of three tombs being excavated as part of an archaeological dig in 1976. It was accompanied by other military related artifacts and the remains of a middle-aged man and woman.

Some scholars have argued that the shield is the same one that Alexander the Great took from a shrine in Troy and used in his campaigns, however opponents of this theory have pointed out that the shield is not suited for battle and does not completely fit descriptions of the campaign shield, leading them to instead propose that it was used for religious or festive purposes. Other opine that the shield belonged to Alexander's brother, Philip III Arrhidaios, who is believed to have been buried inside Tomb II.

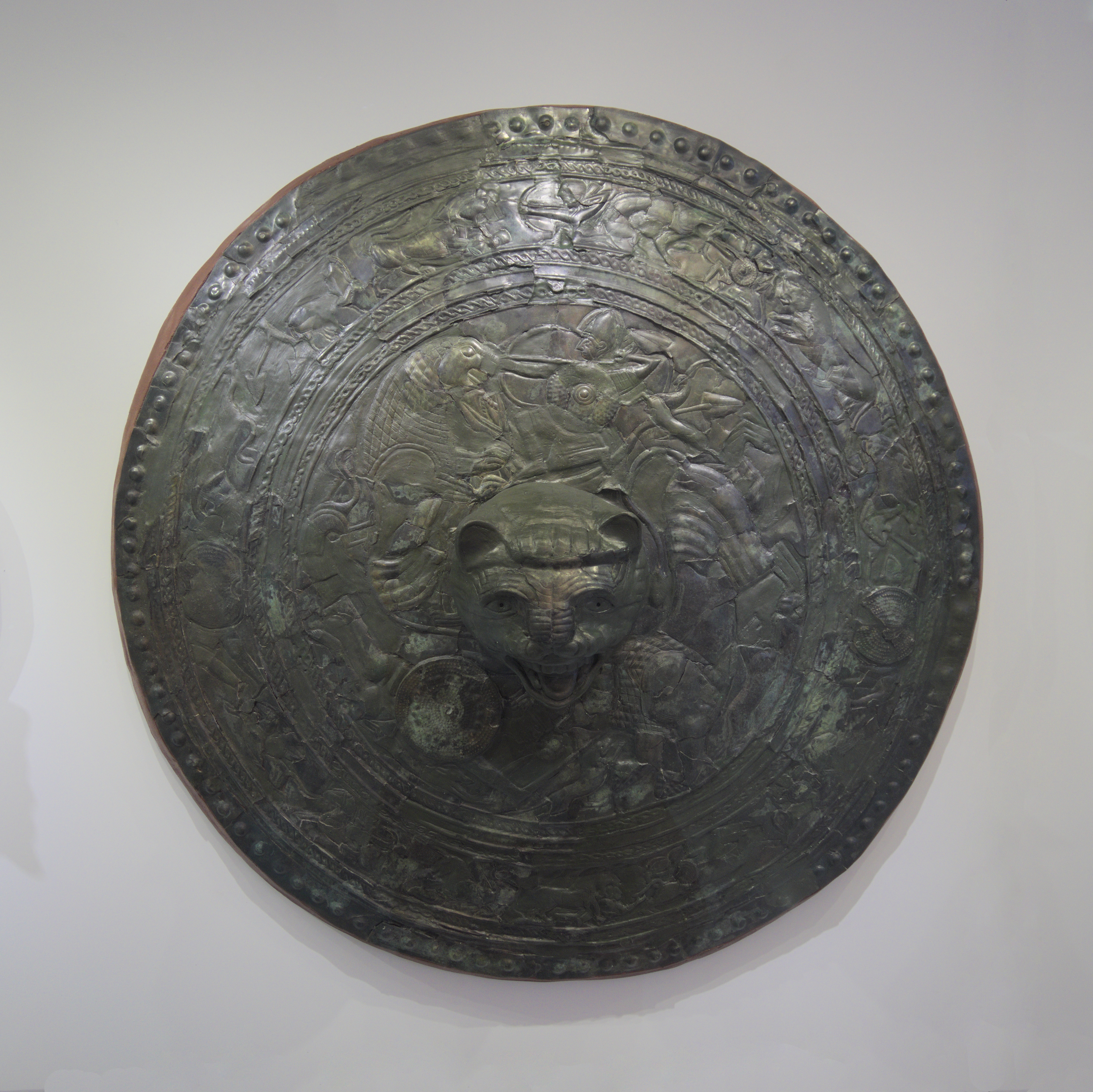
An example of a ceremonial shield similar in function to the Ceremonial Shield from the Tombs of Vergina.

== Description ==
The ceremonial shield is in the basic form of an aspis but with more ornate decoration and is made of wood, leather, glass, gold, and ivory. The front of the shield includes a geometric pattern of ivory surrounding the border, while a gold wreath encompasses two deteriorated ivory figures in the center. Because of the erosion of the figures, their identities are not clear, but a male figures appears to tower over a smaller, female figure. The reverse side of the shield includes an ornate golden handle in a "T" shape with floral designs at the ends. Near the middle of the handle grip, two small lions are carved into the gold. Scholars such as N. G. L. Hammond believe that the figures are likely a symbol of power or royalty and that the shield's rich design fits with the other grave goods found in the royal tomb, which were made of gold, silver, and ivory.
