= Silberschlag =

Silberschlag may refer to:

- Johann Silberschlag (1721–1791), German Lutheran pastor (1753–1766) and natural scientist
- Silberschlag (crater), a crater on the Moon named after him
- Eisig Silberschlag
