= Philinna =

Greek name

Philinna (Greek: Φίλιννα) or Philine (Greek: Φιλίνη) was the name of many Greek women.

The woman named Philinna of Larissa in Thessaly, became a wife of Philip II with whom she had a son, Philip III Arrhidaeus. Ptolemy, son of Agesarchos and Justin claim she was a dancer, and Plutarch describes her as common born. Plutarch's and Justin's accounts also label Arrhidaeus as an illegitimate, thus depicting Philinna as royal concubine, rather than Queen consort of Macedon. Daniel Ogden asserts Phillinna probably came from Aleuadae nobility and allegations about her proffession, low birth and concubinage are slander by ancient authors who favoured Alexander's rights to the throne over those of Arrihidaeus's, and thus wished to depict the latter as unworthy of the accession.

A first-century-BC papyrus fragment, the Philinna Papyrus, preserves a spell to cure headaches attributed to one Philinna the Thessalian. It has been suggested by Matthew Dickie and Daniel Ogden that she should be identified with aforementioned above mother of Arrhidaeus.

It was also the name of the mother of the poet Theocritus (Ep. 3).

The name occurs in Aristophanes' drama The Clouds.

In the eighteenth century Goethe used it for a character in his novel Wilhelm Meister's Apprenticeship.
