= Ariadaeus (crater) =

Crater on the Moon

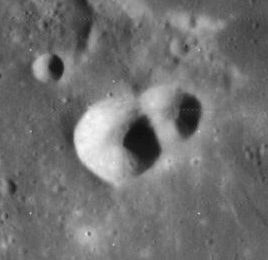
- Lunar Orbiter 4 image
- Coordinates: 4.6°N 17.3°E
- Diameter: 10.4 km (6.5 mi)
- Depth: 1.8 km (1.1 mi)
- Colongitude: 342° at sunrise
- Eponym: Philippus Arrhidaeus

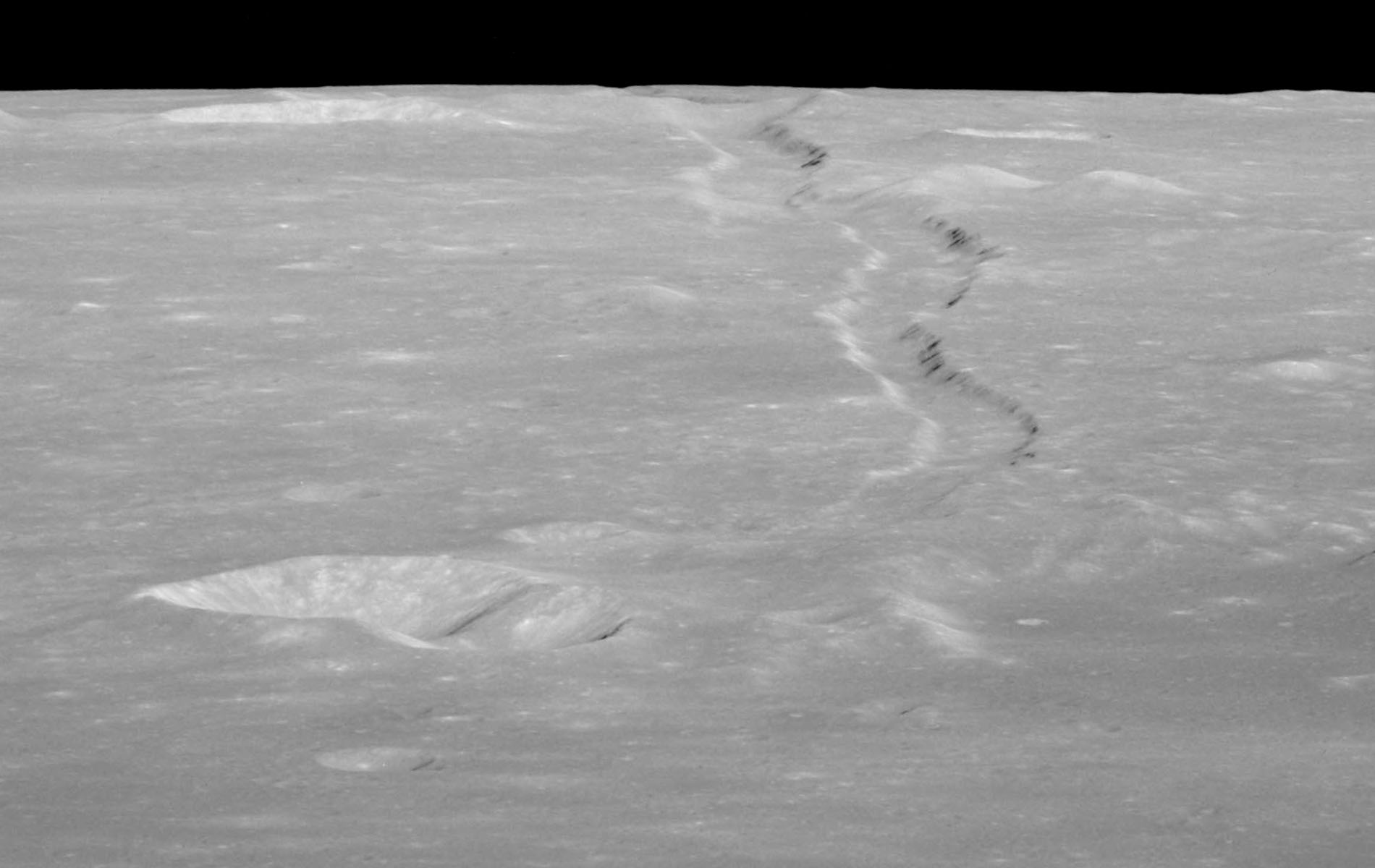
Oblique view from Apollo 10, with Ariadaeus in lower left and Rima Ariadaeus extending to the horizon

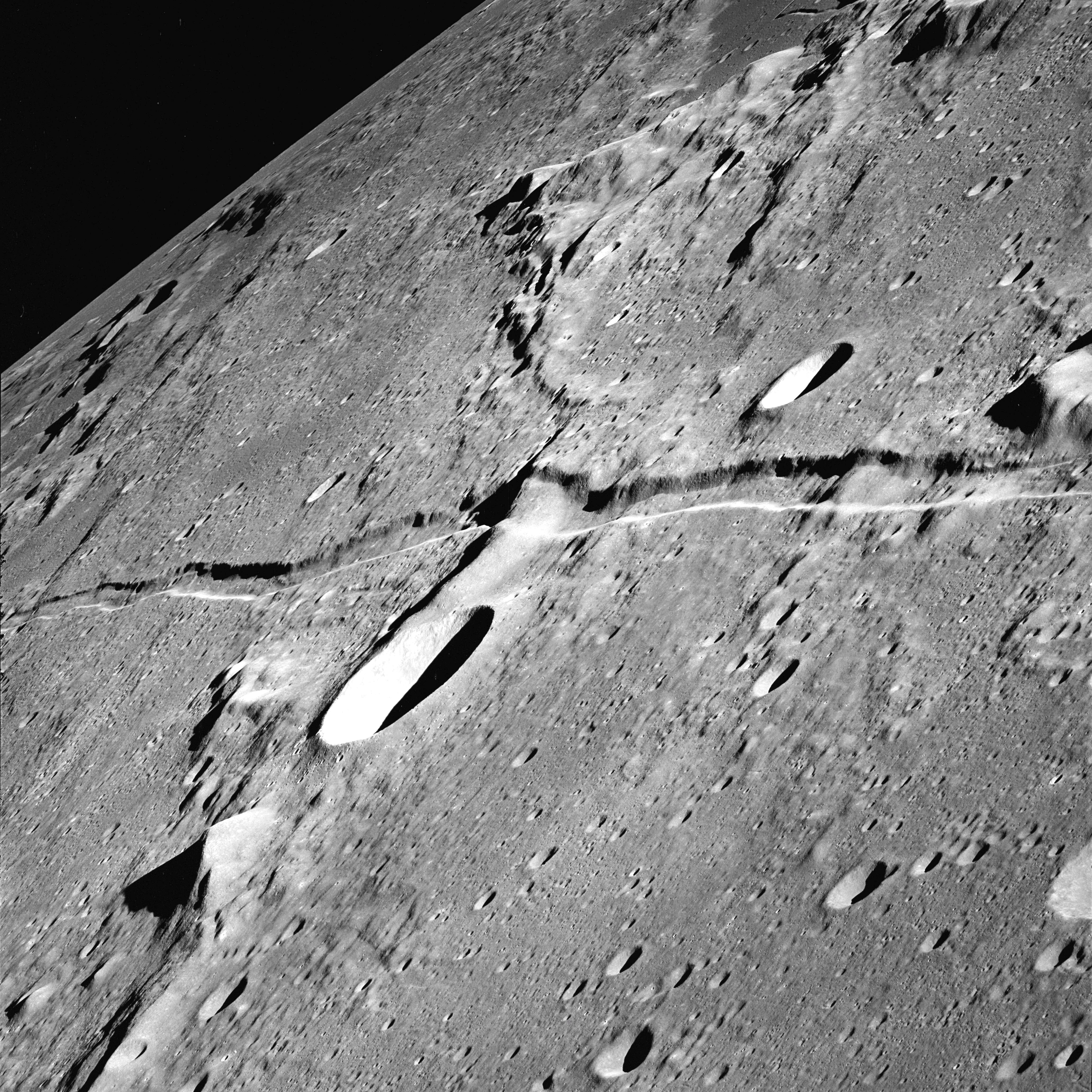
Rimae Ariadaeus from Apollo 10. NASA photo.

Ariadaeus is a small, bowl-shaped lunar impact crater on the western shores of Mare Tranquillitatis. It lies to the north of the crater Dionysius, and to the west-southwest of Arago. The crater is joined along the northeast rim by the slightly smaller Ariadaeus A, and the two form a double-crater. Its diameter is 10.4 km.

This crater marks the eastern extent of the rille designated Rima Ariadaeus. This wide rille extends in a nearly straight line to the west-northwest, passing just to the north of the crater Silberschlag. Other rille systems lie in the vicinity, including the Rimae Ritter to the southeast and Rimae Sosigenes to the northeast.

The crater was named after Macedonian king Philip III Arrhidaeus (c. 358-317 B.C.). This name was formally adopted by the International Astronomical Union in 1935. The introduction of this name into lunar nomenclature is attributed to Italian astronomer Giovanni Riccioli in 1651, although he assigned it to the crater now called Dionysius.

== Satellite craters ==
By convention these features are identified on lunar maps by placing the letter on the side of the crater midpoint that is closest to Ariadaeus.

Ariadaeus	Latitude	Longitude	Diameter
A	4.6° N	17.5° E	8 km
B	4.9° N	15.0° E	8 km
D	4.9° N	17.0° E	4 km
E	5.3° N	17.7° E	24 km
F	4.4° N	18.0° E	3 km
