= Myrtle wreath at Vergina =

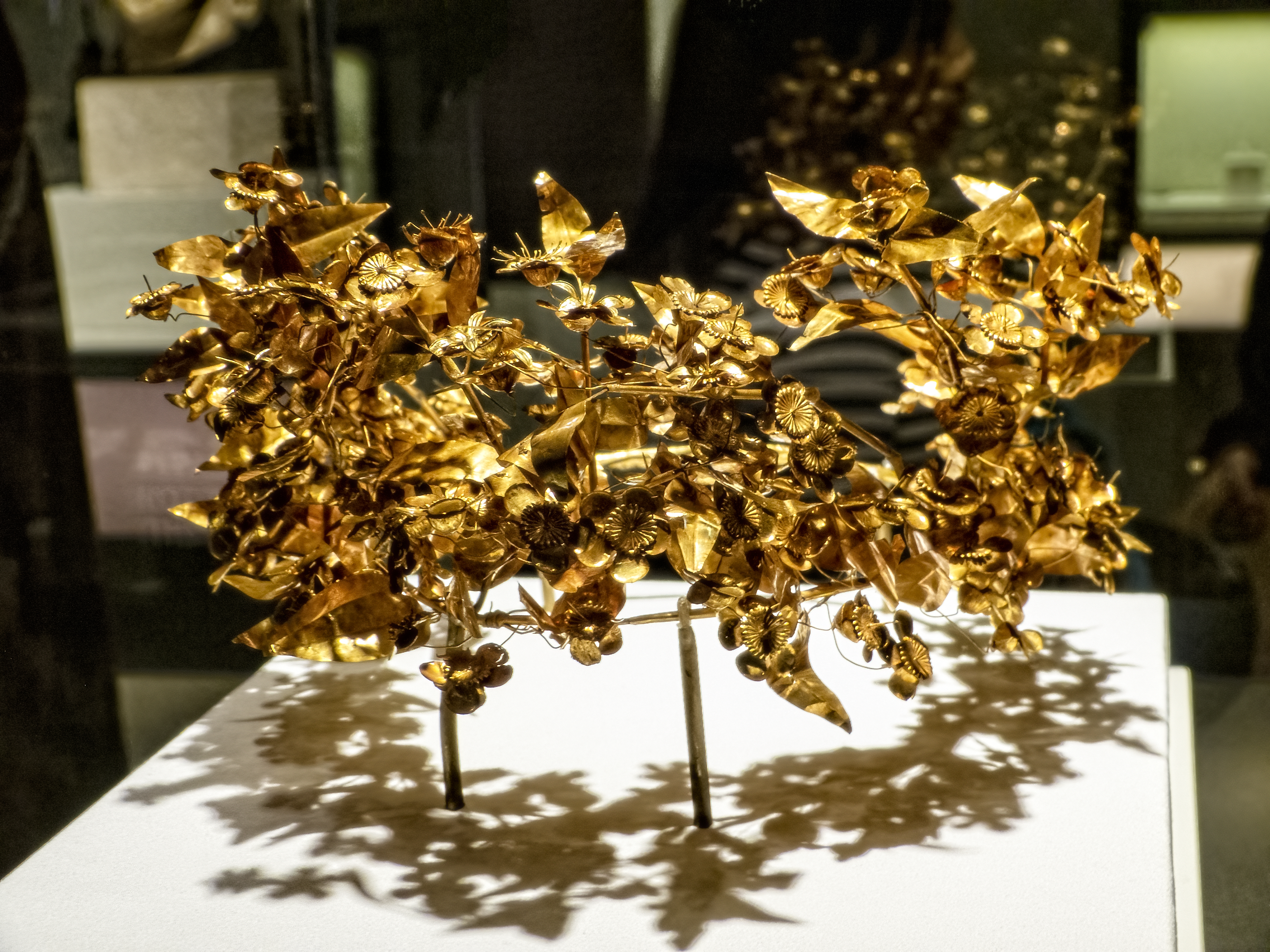
The golden wreath.

Myrtle wreath at Vergina (Greek: Χρυσό στεφάνι της Βεργίνας, Latin: corona Verginae) made of gold myrtle (Myrtus communis) leaves and flowers, is one of the most valuable finds from the antechamber of the royal Macedonian tombs at Vergina, Greece. From the Hellenistic period (300-30 BC), the gold wreath is thought to belong to Meda of Odessos, the Thracian princess and fifth wife of Philip II of Macedon, which was theorized by Greek archaeologist Manolis Andronikos, whom excavated the tomb of Philip II, father of Alexander the Great in 1977. This theory today is still in debate on whether this tomb actually belongs to these royals.

== Meaning and symbolism ==
=== Myrtle and attire ===
A plant sacred to the goddess Aphrodite, myrtle was a symbol of love. Greeks wore wreaths for special events and received them as athletic prizes and honors. The wreaths were made of gold foil, they were created to be buried with the dead but too fragile to be worn for everyday attire. The myrtle leaves and blossoms on the myrtle wreath were cut from thin sheets of gold, stamped and incised details, and then wired onto the stems. Many that survive today were found in graves.

== The myrtle wreath ==
After restoration, there are 80 leaves and 112 flowers. The main wreath, from which the small twigs sprouted, consists of a narrow cylindrical rod, whose two ends are flattened by twisting together. The internal diameter of the main tube is 0.18 - 0.16 m. while the external is 0.26 - 0.23 m. The gold myrtle wreath was exposed at Archaeological Museum of Thessaloniki until 1997, when it is moved to Museum of the Royal Tombs of Aigai at Vergina.
