= Philinna Papyrus =

Ancient Greek manuscript

Composite photograph of the two surviving fragments: P. Amh. 11 (left) and P. Berol. 7504 (right)

The Philinna Papyrus (PGM XX) is part of a collection of ancient Greek spells written in hexameter verse. Three spells are partially preserved on the papyrus. One is a cure for headache, one probably for a skin condition, and the purpose of the third spell is uncertain. Two fragments of the papyrus survive, in the collections of the Morgan Library & Museum, New York, and the Berlin State Museums.

== Papyrus ==
The Philinna Papyrus is made up of two fragments: P. Amh. 11, published by Bernard Grenfell and Arthur Surridge Hunt in 1901, and P. Berol. 7504, published by Ulrich von Wilamowitz-Moellendorff in 1907. In 1942 Paul Maas identified that the two fragments were part of the same roll. The surviving pieces are 10 x 8.2 cm in total: the Amherst fragment is 6 x 4.2 cm, and the Berlin fragment is 10 x 4 cm. Parts of two columns of the papyrus survive, written in a hand dating to the first century BC. The verso of the papyrus preserves parts of two further columns, in a cursive hand from about the first century AD.

The fragments were discovered in Egypt, most likely from Faiyum. P. Amh. 11 was purchased by Grenfell and Hunt on behalf of Lord Amherst between 1897 and 1900. In 1912 it was acquired by the J.P. Morgan Library (now the Morgan Library & Museum) in New York. P. Berol. 7504 was bought by the Berlin State Museums from Heinrich Karl Brugsch in 1891. Critical editions of the papyrus text are included in Papyri Graecae Magicae as PGM XX, Supplementum Hellenisticum as SH 900, and Greek and Egyptian Magical Formularies as GEMF 3.

== Contents ==
The Philinna Papyrus is part of a collection of spells in hexameter verses. Each spell has a title with the name and nationality of the author and the ailment which the charm is intended to cure. The surviving portion of the papyrus preserves three spells. The first spell is damaged, and it is not certain what it was for. This damaged spell is followed by two more: one attributed to a Syrian woman for inflammation, and one by Philinna of Thessaly for headaches. Unlike other surviving ancient collections of spells, the Philinna Papyrus does not contain any descriptions of rituals to accompany the spells, and Christopher Faraone argues that its format is more influenced by Hellenistic literary anthologies than other magical handbooks. The papyrus is unique among Greek magical papyri in attributing the spells it contains to women.

=== First spell ===
The second edition of Papyri Graecae Magicae restores the heading of the first spell as [πρὸ]ς κεφαλῆ(ς) [πόνον] ("spell for a headache"). Robert Daniel suggests instead that the letters κεφαλη are an abbreviation for the adjective Κεφαλη(νίδος) ("of the Kephallenian woman"), indicating the nationality of the author just as the authors of the second and third spells are identified as women of Syria and Thessaly. This spell ends with the phrase τ[έλεσον τε]λέαν ἐπαοιδ[ή]ν ("bring to perfection a perfect incantation"), apparently a traditional ending to an incantation which is also known from a fragment of Aristophanes' lost play Amphiaraus.

=== Syrian woman's spell ===
Lines 4–12 of the papyrus are a spell πρὸς πᾶν κατάκαυμα ("for any inflammation"), attributed to a Syrian woman from Gadara. The name of the Syrian woman does not survive. Another version of the same spell is known from a papyrus from Oxyrhynchus. The inflammation that the spell treats is probably a sort of skin condition, though the word κατάκαυμα is also used in ancient Greek medical texts for fever.

The charm is of the type known as historiola, wherein a myth is told which is analogous to the desired outcome of the spell. In the story, seven maidens put out a fire with pitchers of water. No other version of this story is known in Greek mythology, though there are parallels with an Egyptian myth about Isis and Horus, and even earlier Egyptian and Mesopotamian healing magic. The Syrian woman's spell on the Philinna Papyrus is the earliest surviving instance of a historiola in ancient Greek magic. A third- or fourth-century AD papyrus from Oxyrhynchus apparently preserves two prose versions of this spell.

=== Philinna's spell ===
Lines 13–19 are a spell for headaches, attributed to Philinna the Thessalian. The identity of this Philinna is uncertain. Maas suggests that she is fictitious, and that the name Philinna was chosen as a common Greek name. However, in later magical papyri the men to whom spells are attributed tend to be famous, and Matthew Dickie argues that the same is likely to be true of Philinna. He suggests that she may be the same as the Philinna from Larissa who was the mother of Philip Arrhidaeus, one of the sons of Philip II of Macedon and half-brother of Alexander the Great.

Like the first spell, Philinna's spell takes a traditional form. It commands the headache to flee from the patient; similar formulae are known from a fragment of Aristotle from the fourth century BC, and were still in use in the first century AD, when Pliny the Elder quotes an example in his Natural History.

== Works cited ==
- Baptista Sánchez, Ana Isabel (2017). "Algunas Consideraciones Sobre el Papiro De Filina (P. Amh. 11 y P. Berol. 7504)" (PDF). EClassica. III.
- Betz, Hans Dieter, ed. (1986). The Greek Magical Papyri in Translation Including the Demotic Spells. University of Chicago Press. ISBN 0226044440.
- Daniel, Robert W. (1988). "A note on the Philinna Papyrus (PGM XX 1–2)". Zeitschrift für Papyrologie und Epigraphik. 73: 306. JSTOR 20186887.
- Dickie, Matthew W. (1994). "The Identity of Philinna in the Philinna Papyrus ('PGM^{2}' XX.15; 'SH' 900.15)". Zeitschrift für Papyrologie und Epigraphik. 100: 119–122. JSTOR 20189015.
- Faraone, Christopher A. (1996). "Taking the "Nestor's Cup Inscription" Seriously: Erotic Magic and Conditional Curses in the Earliest Inscribed Hexameters". Classical Antiquity. 15 (1): 77–112. doi:10.2307/25011032. JSTOR 25011032.
- Faraone, Christopher A. (1997). "Salvation and Female Heroics in the Parodos of Aristophanes' Lysistrata". Journal of Hellenic Studies. 117: 38–59. doi:10.2307/632549. JSTOR 632549. S2CID 163041704.
- Faraone, Christopher A. (2000). "Handbooks and Anthologies: The Collection of Greek and Egyptian Incantations in Late Hellenistic Egypt". Archiv für Religionsgeschichte. 2 (1). doi:10.1515/9783110234183.195. S2CID 193620521.
- Faraone, Christopher A.; Torallas Tovar, Sofía, eds. (2022). Greek and Egyptian Magical Formularies: Text and Translation, Vol. 1. Berkeley, CA: California Classical Studies. ISBN 9781939926166.
- Lloyd-Jones, Hugh; Parsons, Peter, eds. (1983). Supplementum Hellenisticum. Berlin: de Gruyter. ISBN 3-11-008171-7.
- Maas, P. (1942). "The Philinna Papyrus". The Journal of Hellenic Studies. 62: 33–38. doi:10.2307/626711. JSTOR 626711. S2CID 163835229.
- Plant, I. M., ed. (2004). Women Writers of Ancient Greece and Rome: An Anthology. University of Oklahoma Press. ISBN 9780806136226.
- Preisendanz, K. (1974). Papyri Graecae Magicae: Die Griechischen Zauberpapyri. Vol. 2 (2nd ed.). Stuttgart: Teubner. ISBN 3-519-04277-0.
- Ritner, Robert K. (1998). "The Wives of Horus and the Philinna Papyrus (PGM XX)". In Clarysse, Willy; Schoors, Antoon; Willems, Harco (eds.). Egyptian Religion: The Last Thousand Years. Peeters. ISBN 9789042906693.
- "TM 65576". Trismegistos Texts.
