= Meda of Odessos =

Thracian princess and Macedonian queen (died 336 BC)

Meda of Odessos (Ancient Greek: Μήδα, romanized: Mḗda), died 336 BC, was a Thracian princess, daughter of the king Cothelas a Getan, and wife of king Philip II of Macedon. Philip married her after Olympias.

According to N. G. L. Hammond, when Philip died, Meda committed suicide so that she would follow Philip to Hades. The people of Macedonia, who were not used to such honours to their kings by their consorts, buried her with him at the Great Tumuli of Vergina, in a separate room. The second larnax found in the tomb might belong to her as well as the gold myrtle wreath.

== Honours ==
Meda Nunatak in Antarctica is named after Meda of Odessos.

== See also ==
- Museum of the Royal Tombs of Aigai (Vergina)

== Sources ==
- Women and monarchy in Macedonia by Elizabeth Donnelly Carney, p. 68; p. 236-237 (ISBN 0806132124)
