= Museum of the Royal Tombs of Aigai (Vergina) =

Museum in Greece around ancient Macedonian tombs

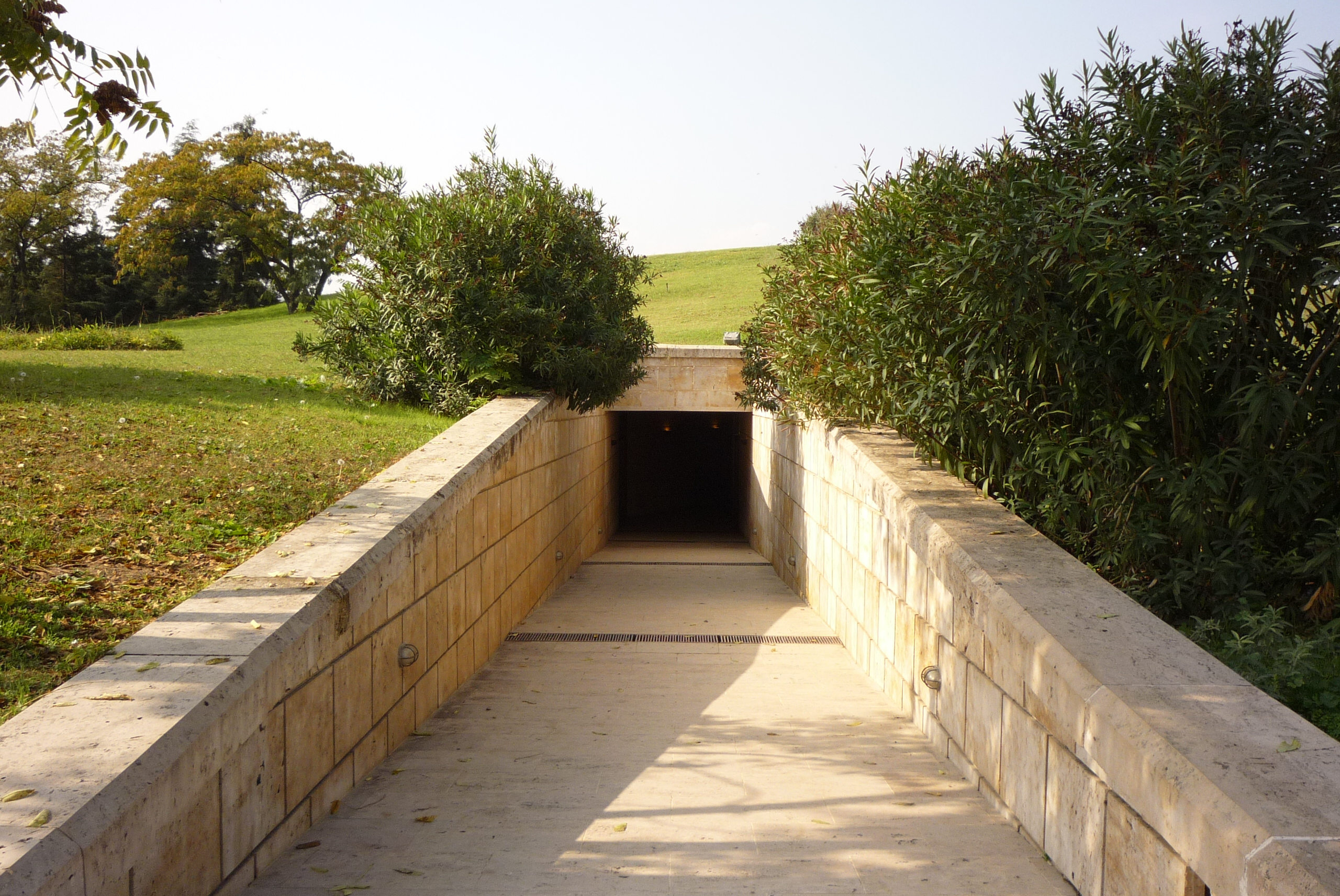
- Entrance to the Royal Tombs of Aigai Museum in Vergina, Greece
- Established: 1997
- Location: Vergina, Central Macedonia, Greece
- Coordinates: 40°29′N 22°19′E
- Type: Archaeological
- Website: https://www.aigai.gr/en/visit

UNESCO World Heritage Site
- Official name: Archaeological Site of Aigai (modern name Vergina)
- Criteria: Cultural: i, iii
- Reference: 780
- Inscription: 1996 (20th Session)
- Area: 1,420.81 ha (3,510.9 acres)
- Buffer zone: 4,811.73 ha (11,890.0 acres)

The Museum of the Royal Tombs of Aigai (Vergina) is located 75 km west of Thessaloniki, Greece, centered around the royal tombs built by the ancient Kingdom of Macedon at Aigai. The underground museum containing the burial cluster of Philip II of Macedon began construction in 1993 and was inaugurated in 1997. Exhibits are presented in four connected areas, including the Palace, the royal burial cluster of the Temenid dynasty (burial cluster "C"), the burial cluster of Philip II, and a gateway entrance with a semi-open-air exhibition of the sculptures found in the city sanctuaries and the restored upper floor of the Palace of Philip's facade. The tombs and other archaeological sites of Aigai were inscribed on the UNESCO World Heritage List in 1996 because of its exceptional architecture and testimony to the transition between city-states and empires in European civilization.

The collections housed in the museum are the grave goods recovered from archaeological excavations beginning in 1861 and continue to the present day.

== Archaeology ==
Archaeologists were interested in the burial mounds around Vergina as early as the 1855 AD, supposing that the site of Aigai was in the vicinity. However, nothing more than empty tombs were found. Excavations began again in 1861 under the French archaeologist Léon Heuzey, sponsored by Napoleon III. Parts of a large building that was considered to be one of the palaces of Antigonus III Doson (263–221 BC), partly destroyed by fire, were discovered near Palatitsa, which preserved the memory of a palace in its modern name. The excavators suggested that this was the site of the ancient city of Valla, a view that prevailed until 1976. However, the excavations had to be abandoned because of the risk of malaria.

The first royal tomb was discovered by Konstantinos Romaios, professor of archaeology at Aristotle University of Thessaloniki who uncovered it while working in the remains of the palace between 1937 and 1940. Much of the palace had been scavenged for construction materials by Greek refugees, who had been resettled there from Turkish Anatolia after the Greco-Turkish War. They built a new settlement at the site which they named Vergina after a legendary queen in 1922. But, the excavations were abandoned on the outbreak of war with Italy in 1940. World War II was followed by the Greek Civil War (1946-1949).

In 1949, excavations were finally resumed by Manolis Andronikos. Andronikos completed the palace excavations in 1970 then turned his attention to the Great Tumulus that he was convinced was a burial mound concealing the tombs of the Macedonian kings. There, in 1977, Andronikos uncovered four buried tombs, two of which had never been disturbed. Andronikos identified these as:

- Tomb II: the tomb of Philip II, father of Alexander the Great and also
- Tomb III: the tomb of Alexander IV of Macedon, son of Alexander the Great and Roxana.

Later they were identified by Antonis Bartsiokas as follows:

- Tomb I: Philip II (Alexander the Great's father)
- Tomb II: Philip III of Macedon (Alexander the Great's half-brother)
- Tomb III: Alexander IV of Macedon (Alexander the Great's son)

Tomb I also contained the remains of a woman and a baby, who Antonis Bartsiokas identified as Philip II's young wife Cleopatra Eurydice and their newborn child. Cleopatra Eurydice was assassinated along with her newborn child.

Although there was much debate for some years, as suspected at the time of the discovery Tomb II has been shown to be that of Philip II as indicated by many features, including the greaves, one of which was shaped consistently to fit a leg with a misaligned tibia (Philip II was recorded as having broken his tibia). Also, the remains of the skull show damage to the right eye caused by the penetration of an object (historically recorded to be an arrow).

Two scientists who studied some of the bones claimed in 2015 that Philip was buried in Tomb I, not Tomb II. On the basis of age, knee ankylosis, and a hole matching the penetrating wound and lameness suffered by Philip, the authors of the study identified the remains of Tomb I in Vergina as those of Philip II. Tomb II instead was identified in the study as that of King Arrhidaeus and his wife Eurydice II. The Greek Ministry of Culture replied that this claim was baseless, and that the archaeological evidence shows that the ankylotic knee belongs to another body which was thrown or put into Tomb I after this had been looted, and probably between 276/5 and 250 BC. Besides this, the theory that Tomb I belonged to Philip II had previously been shown to be false.

More recent research gives conclusive evidence that Tomb II contains the remains of Philip II and his Thracian wife, Meda. This would mean that the magnificent 5.6-metre wall painting above the entrance could be a hunting scene showing Philip and Alexander.

In 1987, a burial cluster including the tomb of Queen Eurydice I was discovered. Between 1991 and 2009, over 1,000 tombs were excavated along with city districts, farm houses, cemeteries, streets, sanctuaries and parts of the city fortification. A royal burial cluster of the Temenids, an ancient Macedonian royal house of Dorian Greek provenance, was also revealed. Then in March 2014, five more royal tombs thought to possibly belong to Alexander I of Macedon and his family or to the family of Cassander were discovered.

== Exhibition areas ==
Among the objects found in the tomb of Philip II were a golden larnax emblazoned with the sixteen-rayed "Sun of Vergina" on its lid, containing the king's bones, an intricate gold burial wreath, a silver and gold diadem with Heracles knot, silver and bronze vessels from the funeral feast, and carved ivory ornaments from the funeral couch. Gold armour and greaves with one custom fitted to Philip's leg deformed by an improperly healed broken tibia, ivory inlaid shields, weapons, ivory reliefs, jewelry, and terracotta votive figurines were also found. Similar objects found in the other tombs, including the jewelry and body adornments from the 9th century BC "Lady of Aigai" are also presented.

== Gallery ==
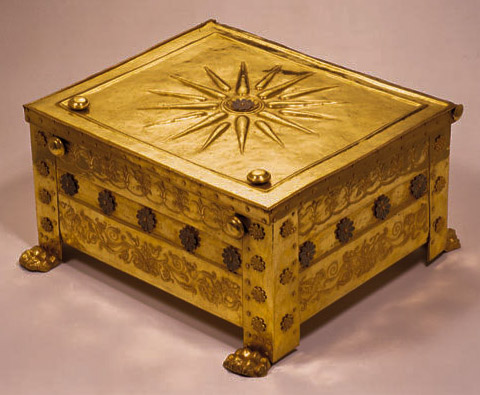
Golden larnax of Philip II of Macedon with Star of Vergina

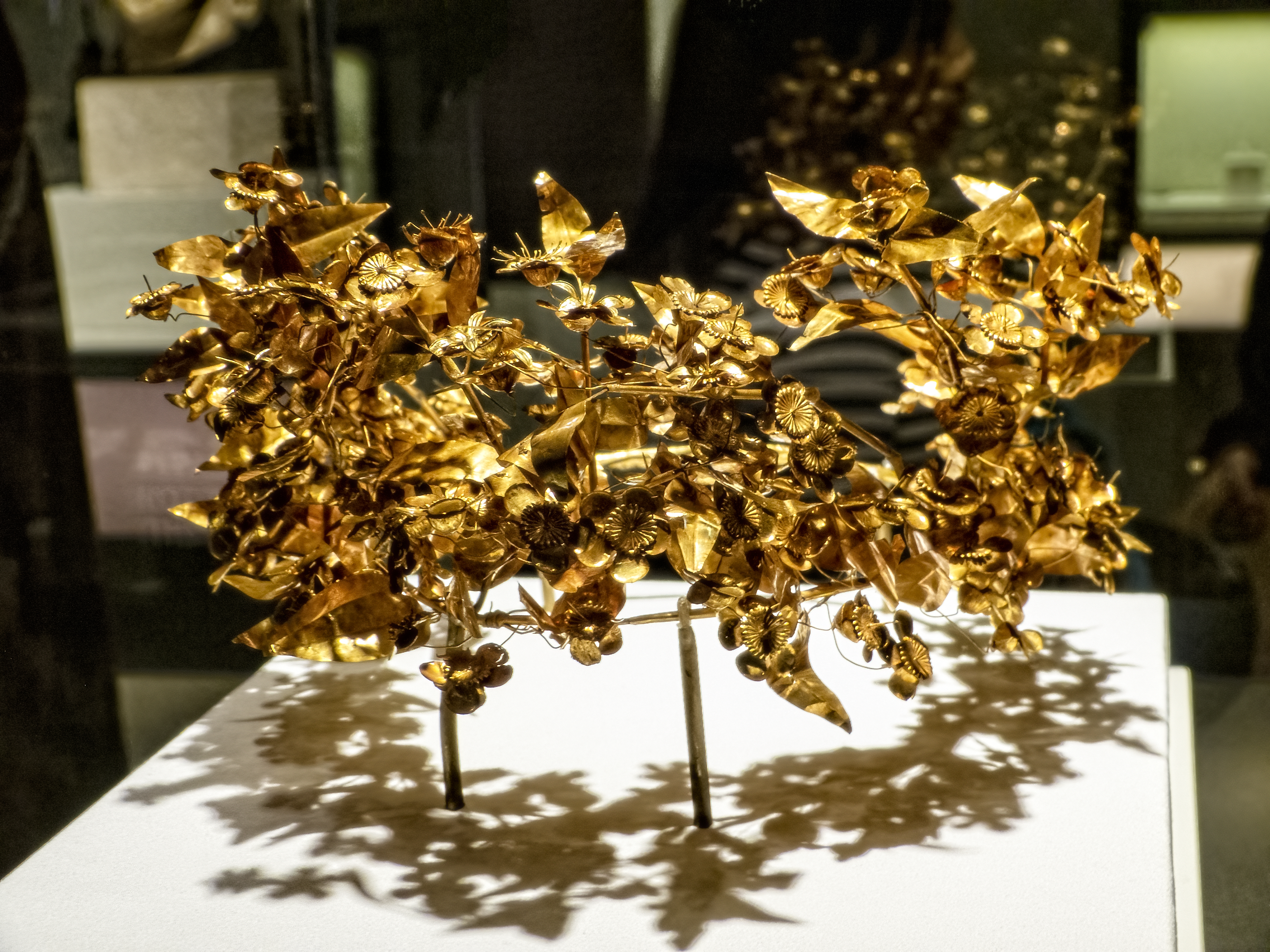
Gold funeral wreath of Queen Meda, Philip II's sixth wife

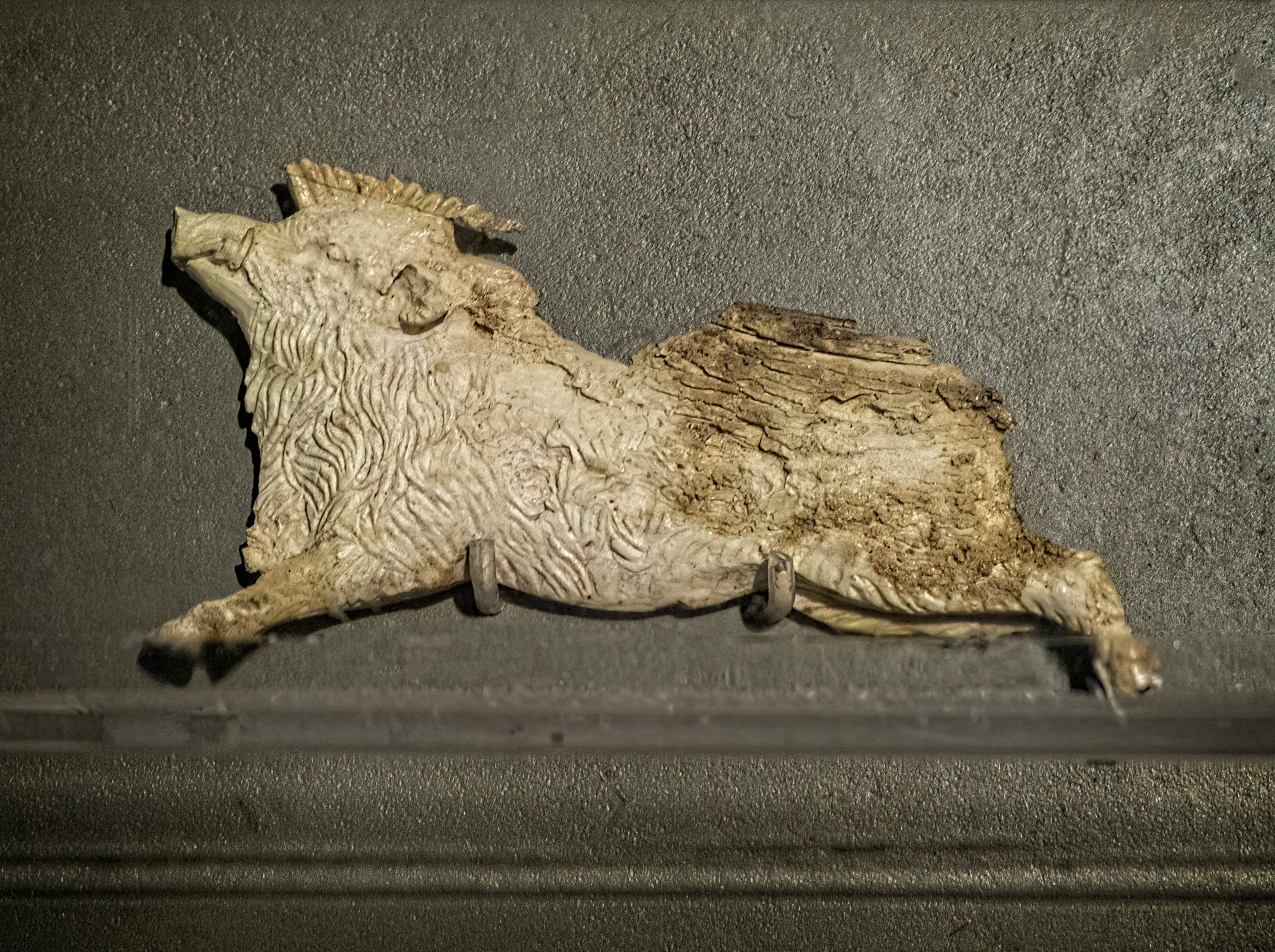
Ivory plaque depicting a boar from the footrest of Philip II's funeral couch

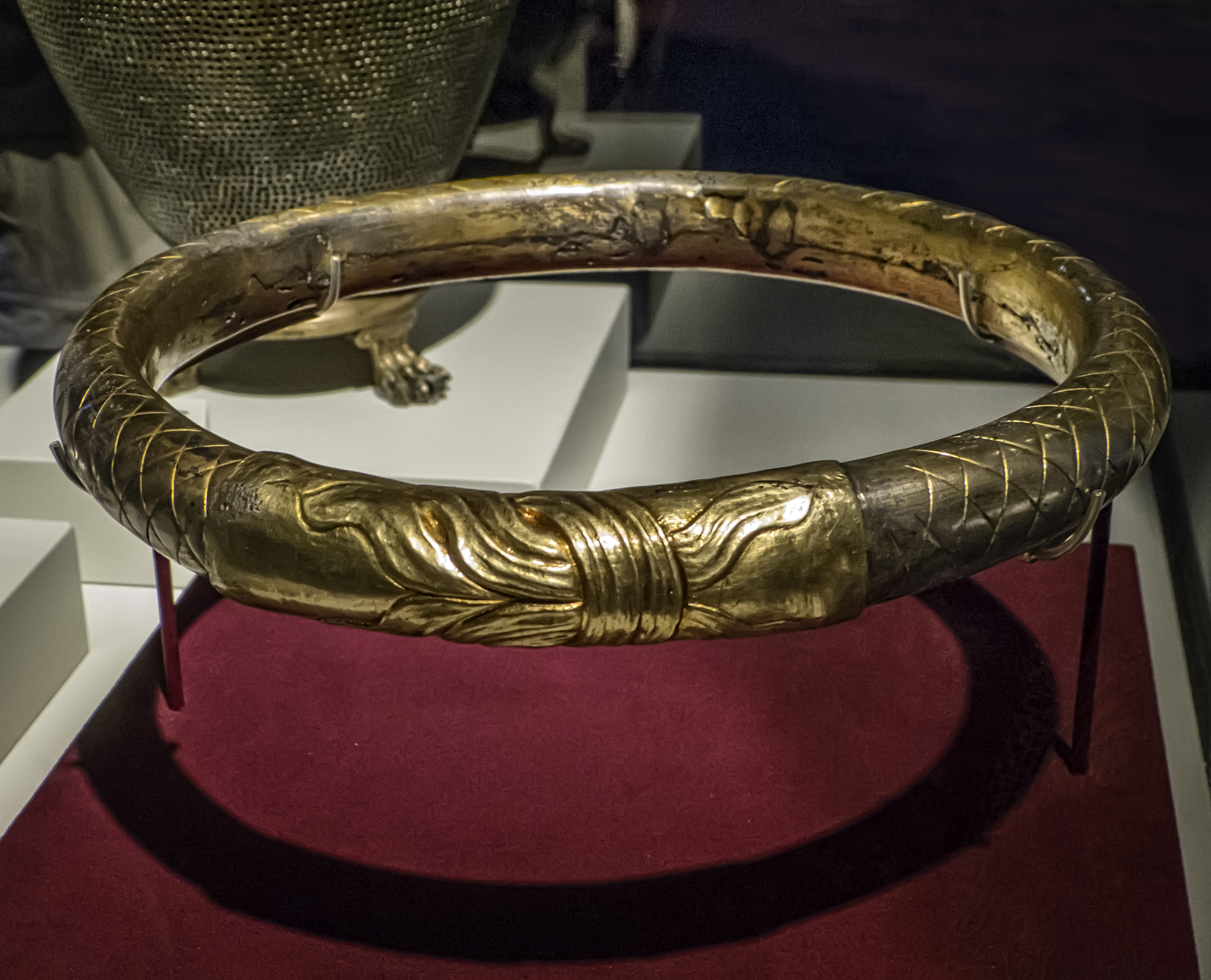
Philip II's silver and gold diadem with Heracles knot

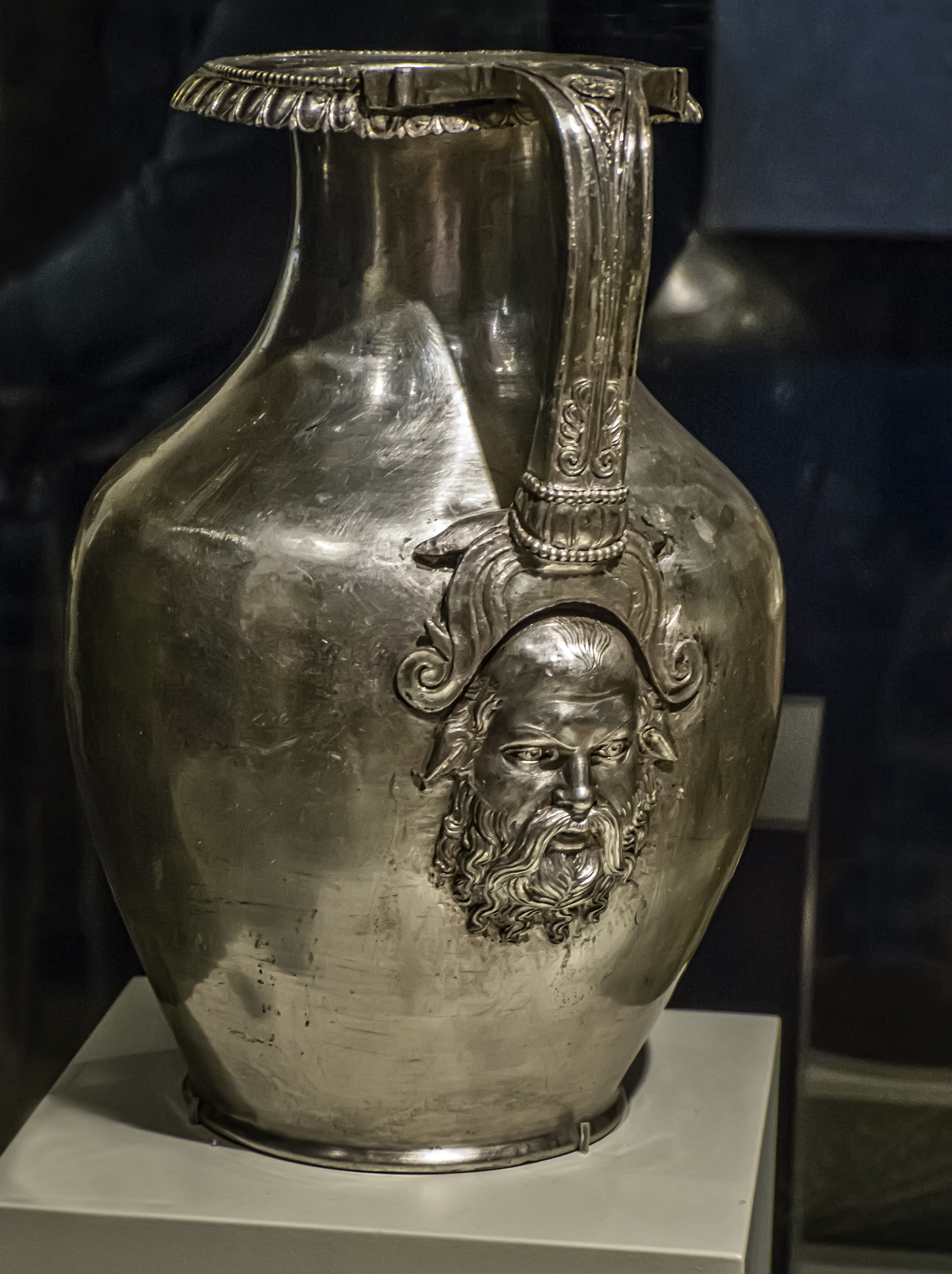
Silver Oinochoe with Silenus relief

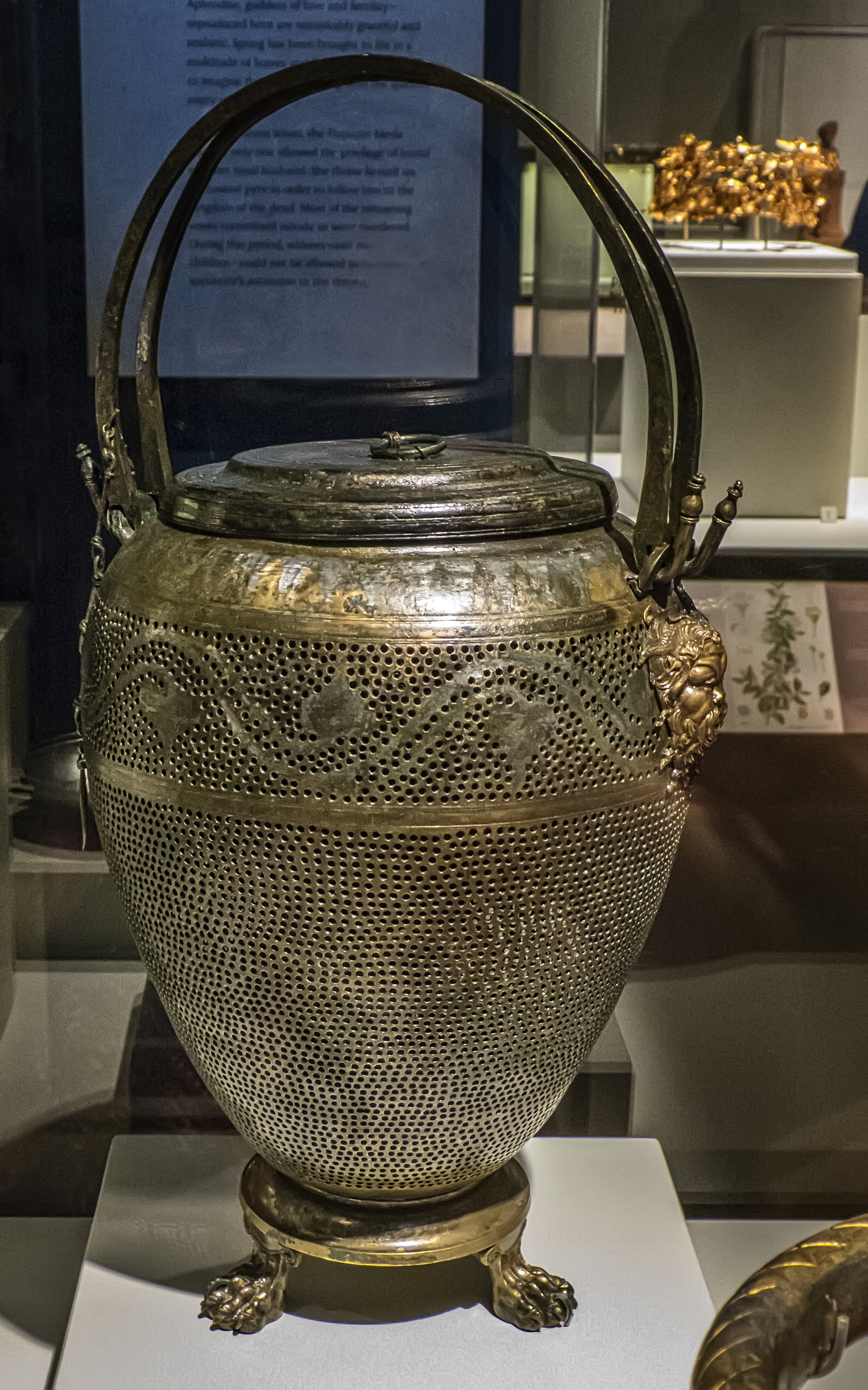
Bronze lantern with Pan relief

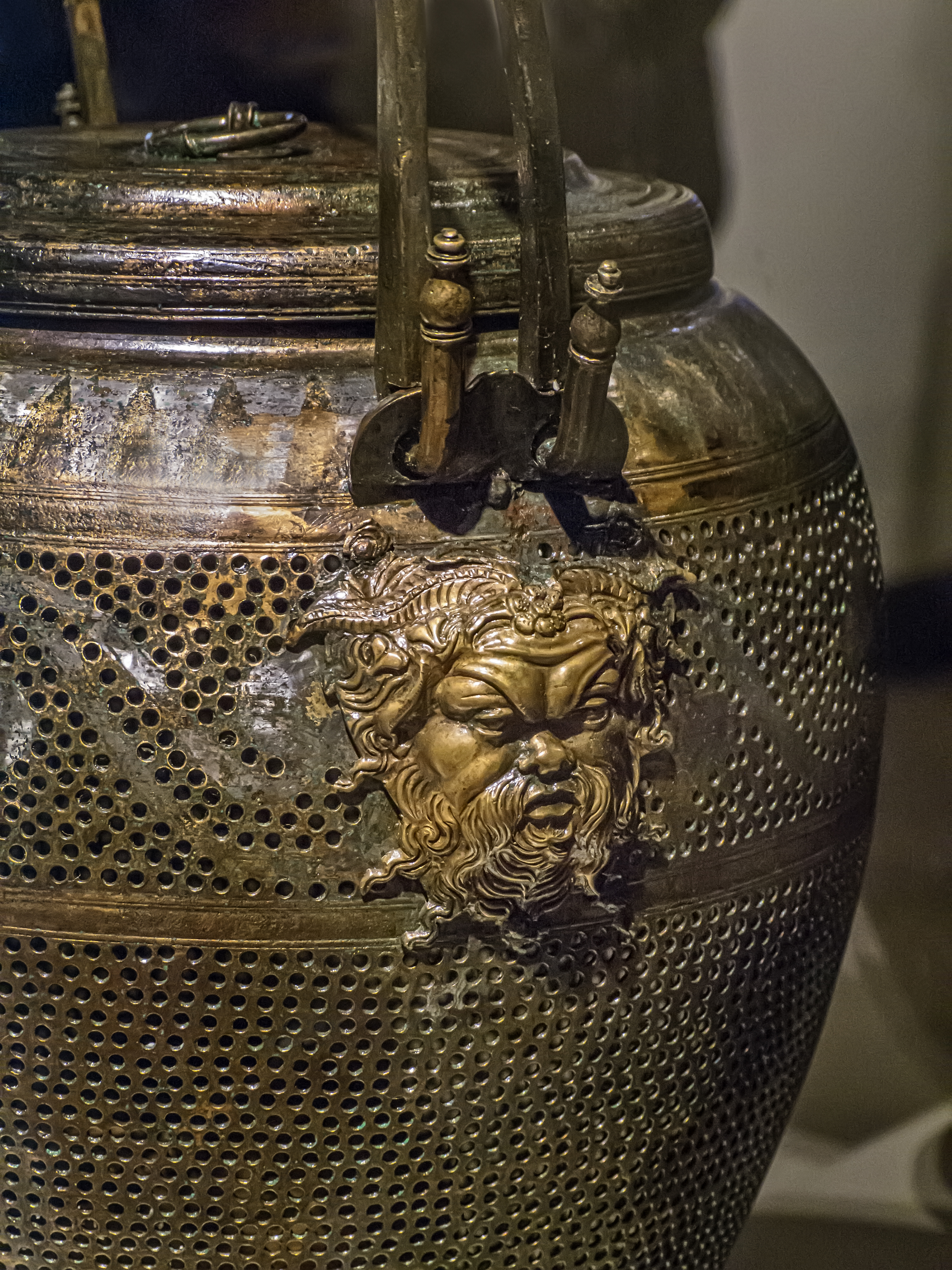
Closeup of Pan relief on bronze lantern

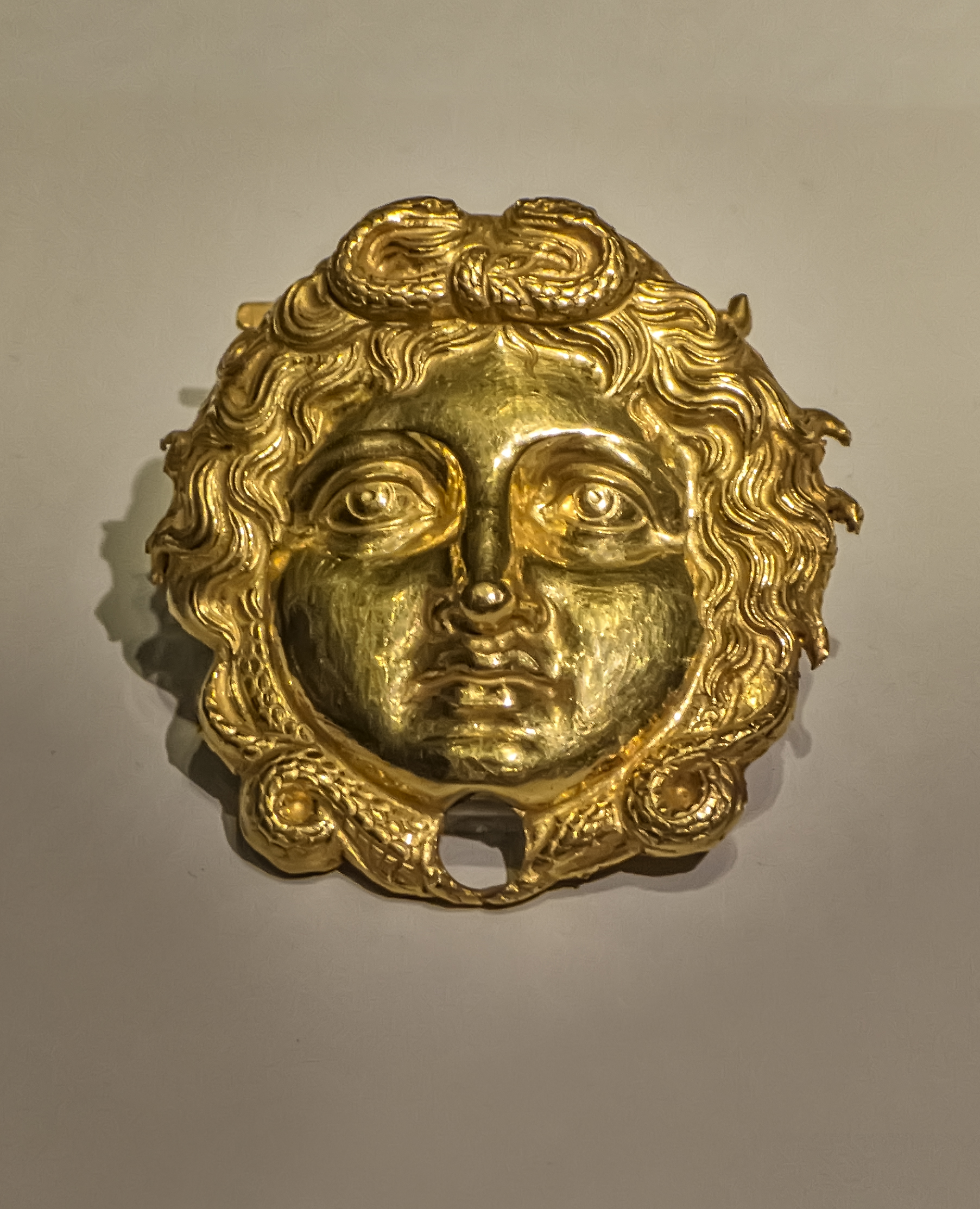
Gold Gorgon Head from Philip II's cuirass (breastplate)

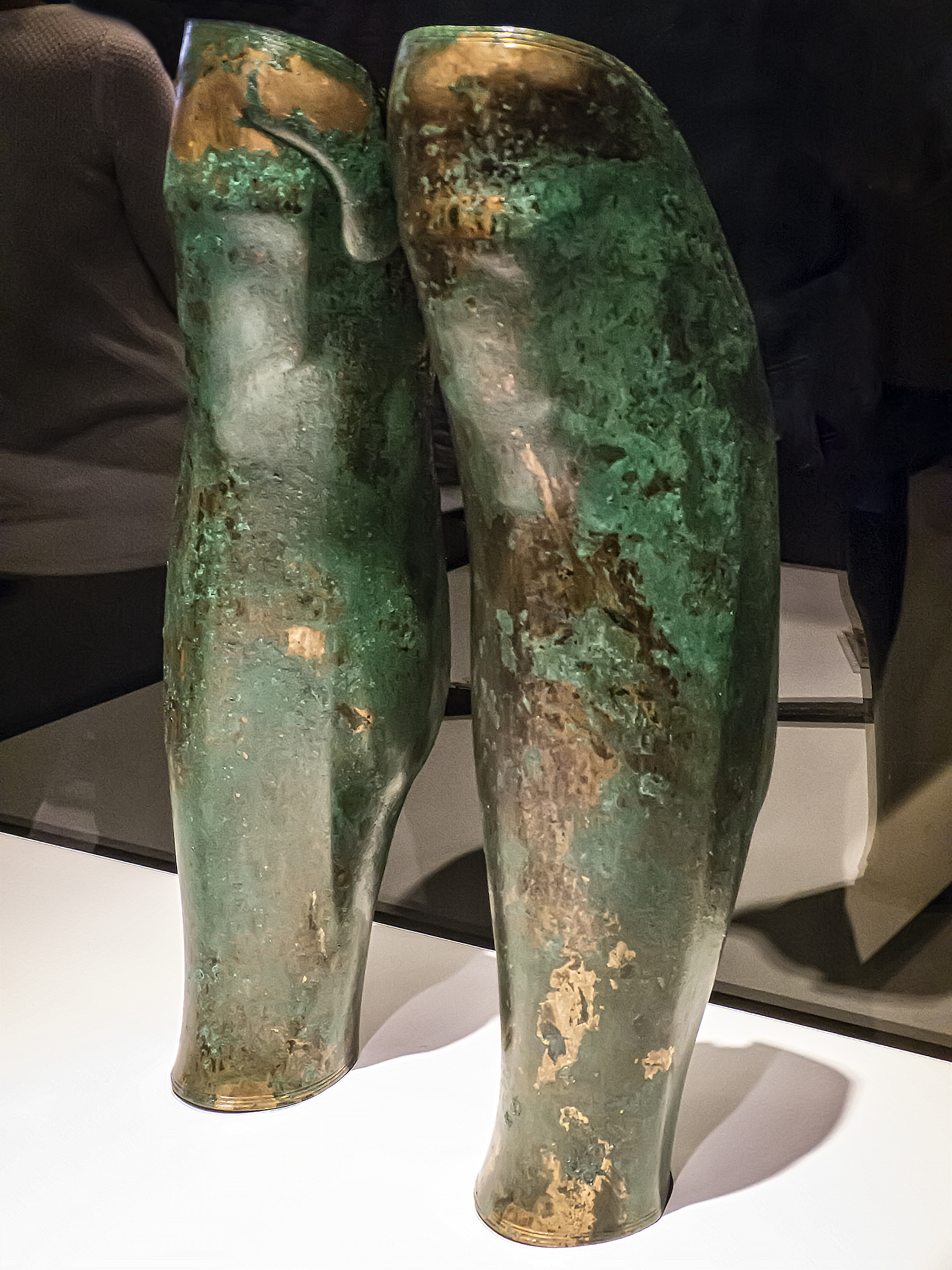
Philip II's bronze greaves

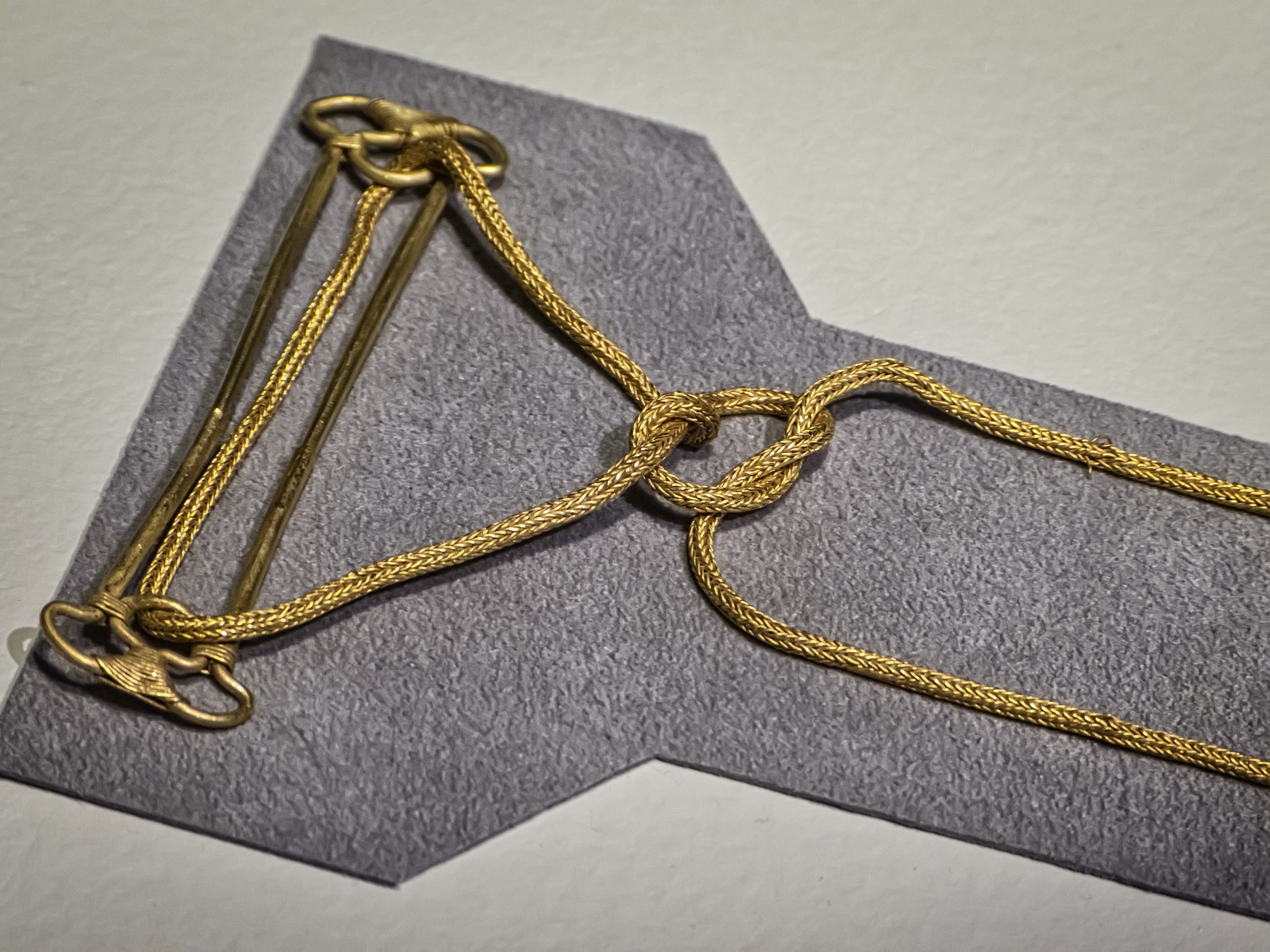
Gold two-pin fibula with chain tied in a Heracles knot

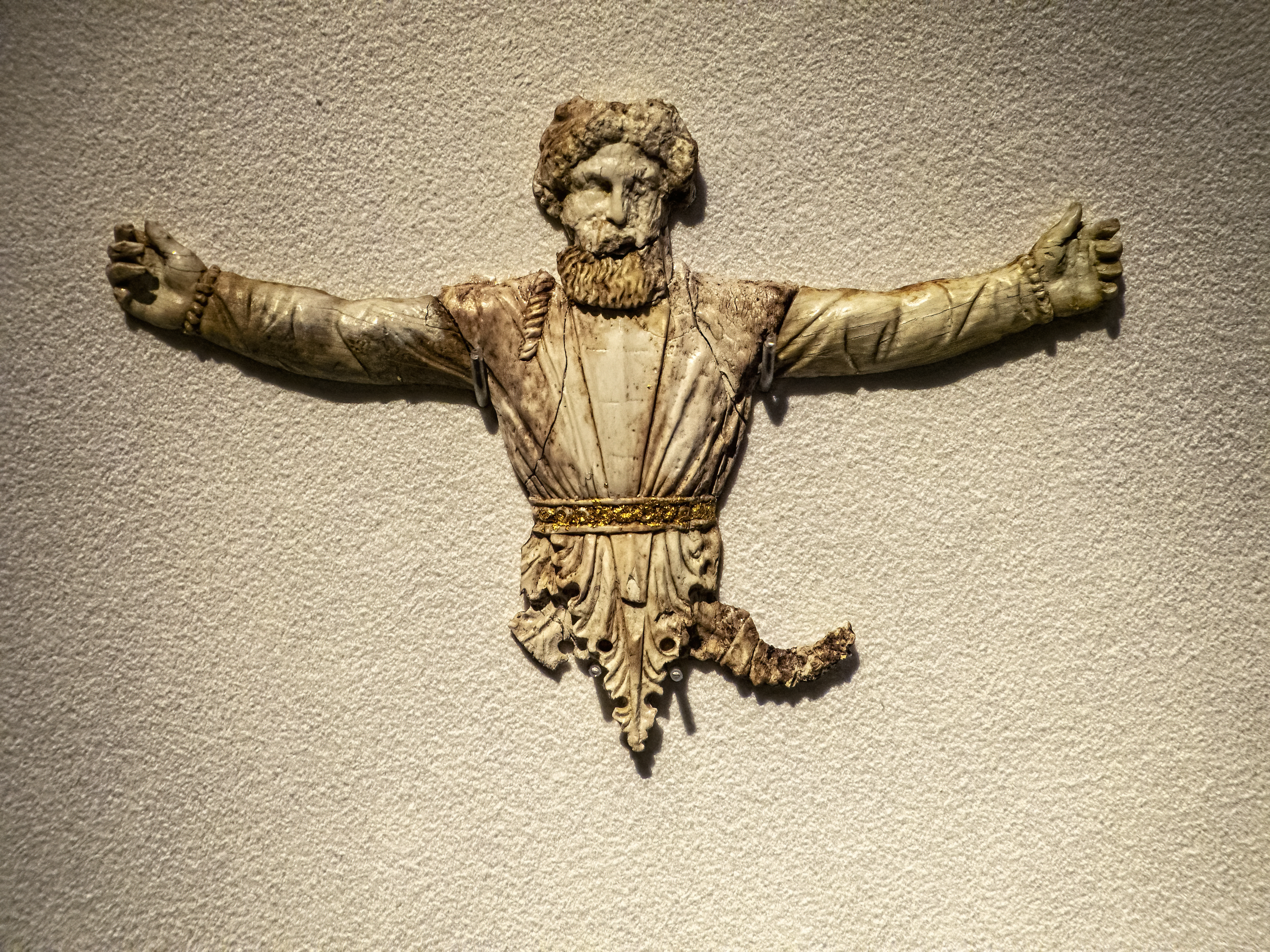
Ivory gold miniature of Sabazios from the tomb of Alexander IV

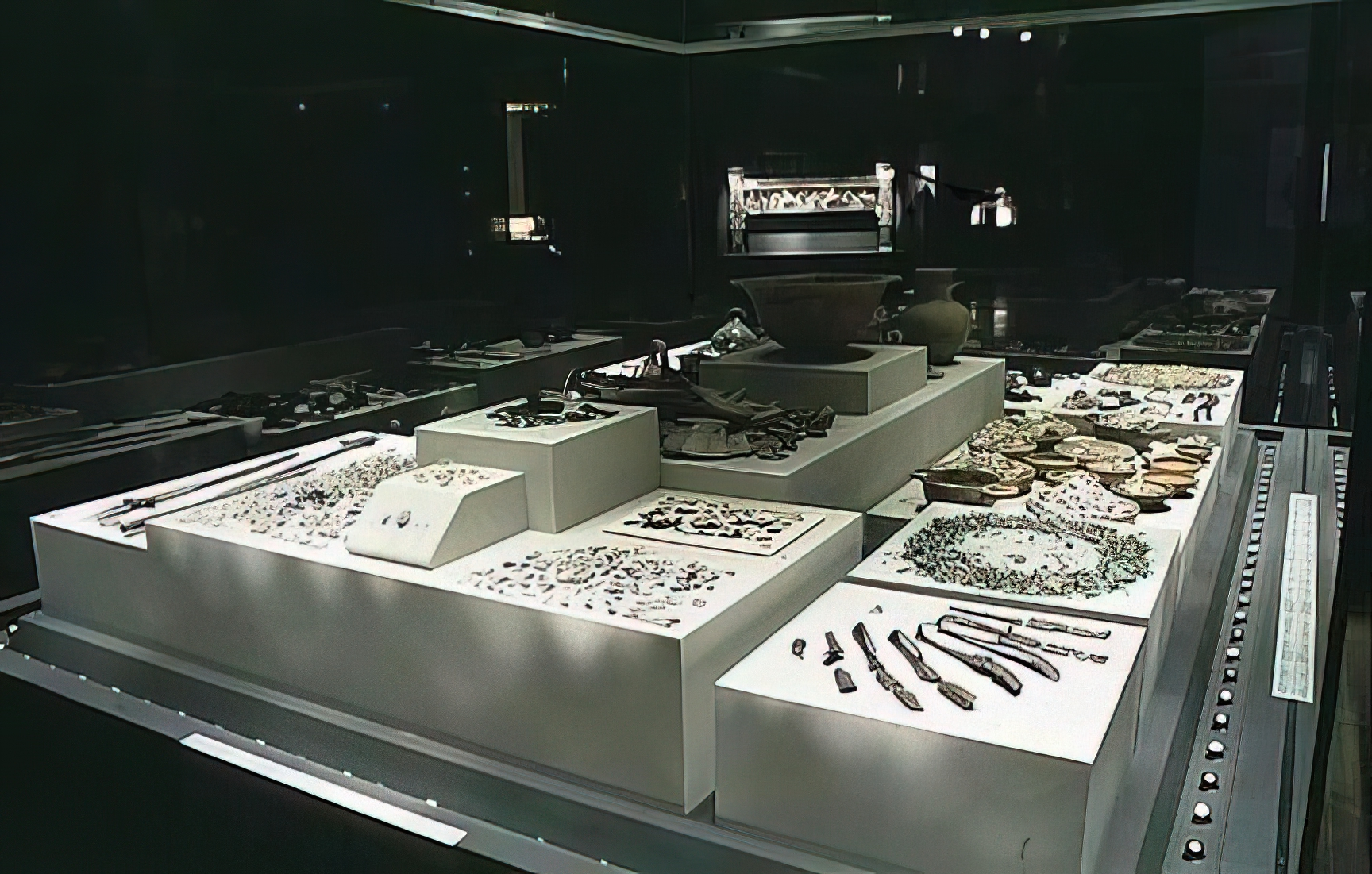
Remains of Philip II's funeral pyre

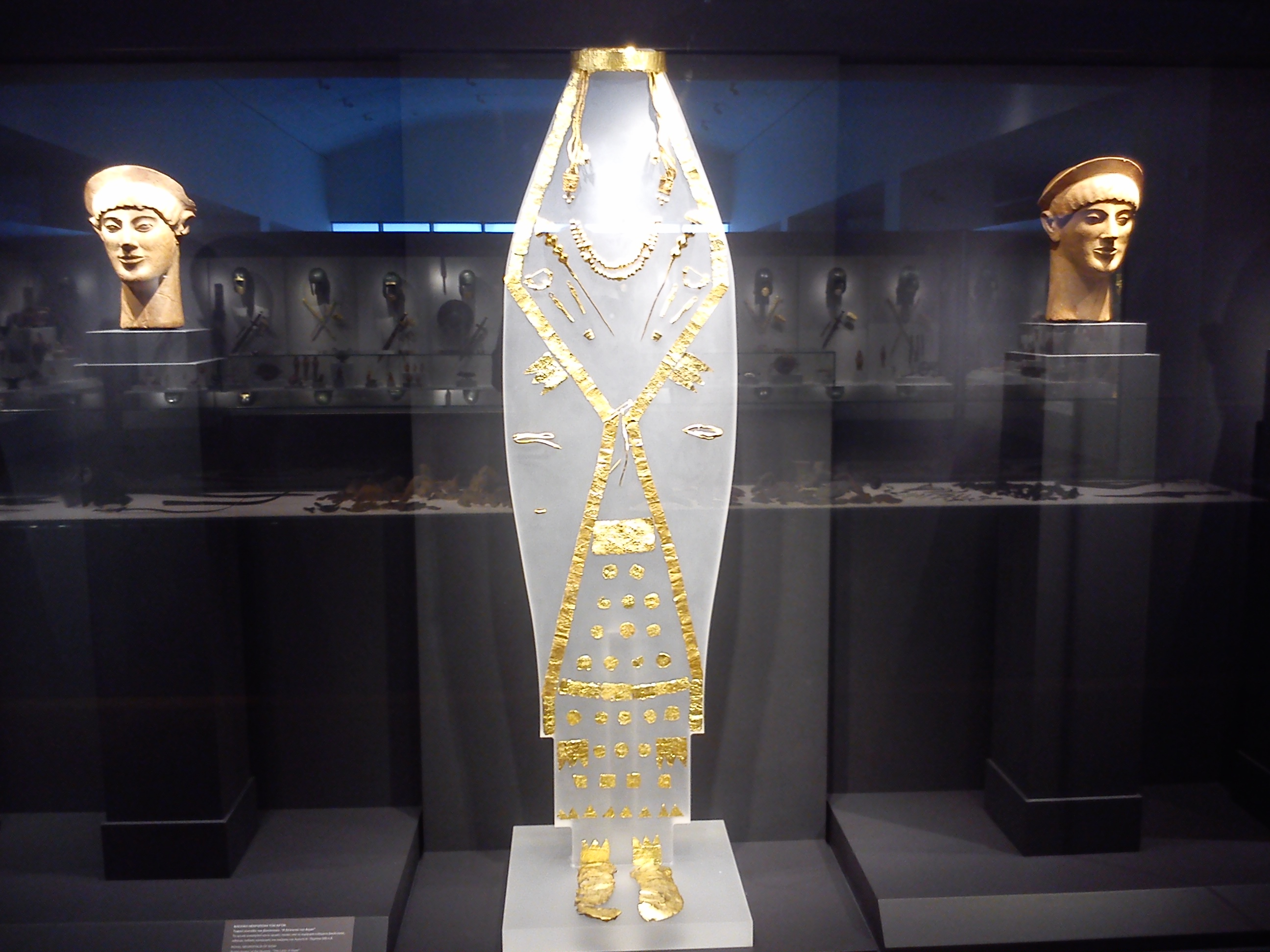
Gold jewelry and garment ornaments of a Macedonian Queen at Aigai

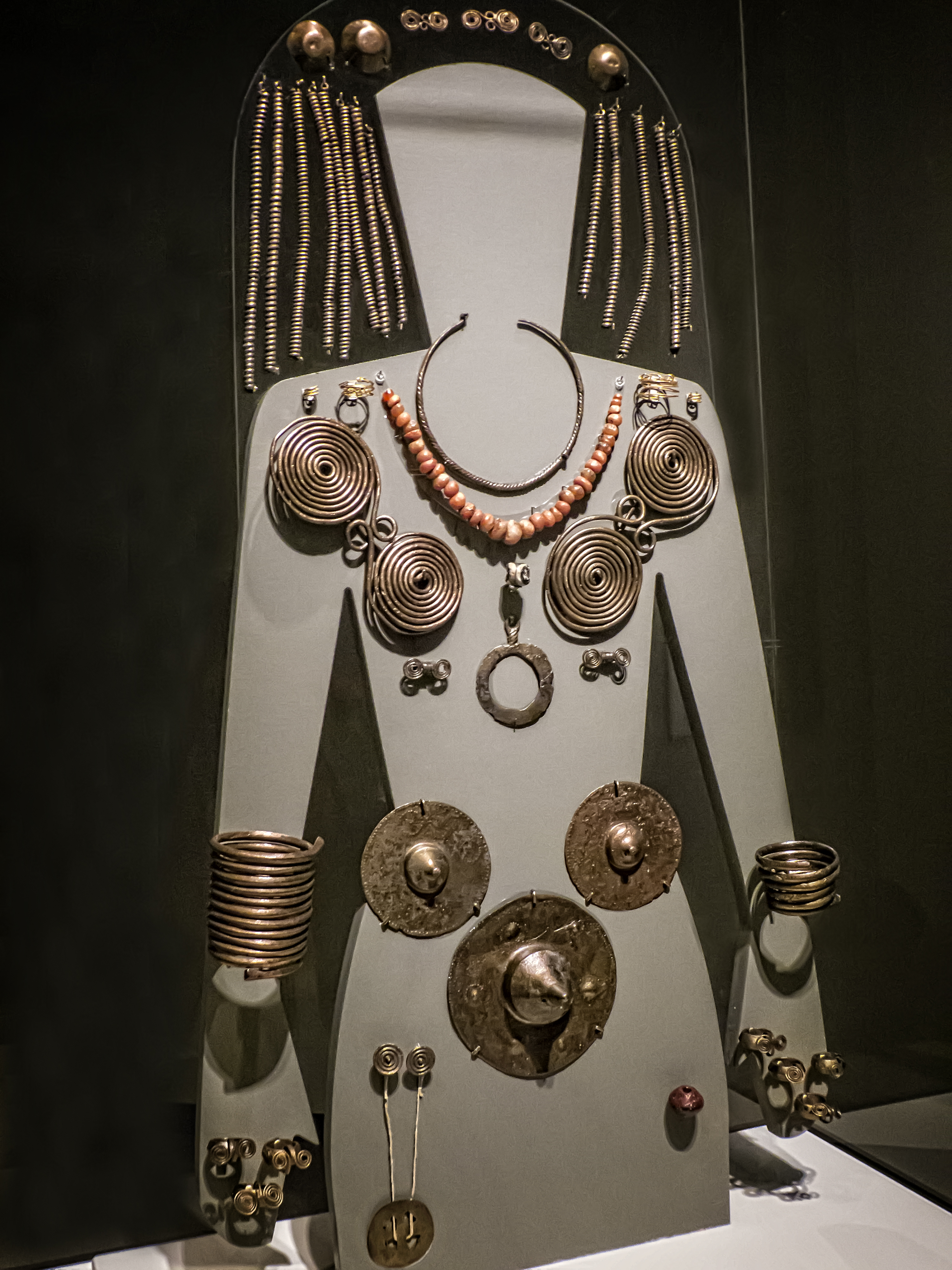
9th century BCE grave goods of the "Lady of Aigai"

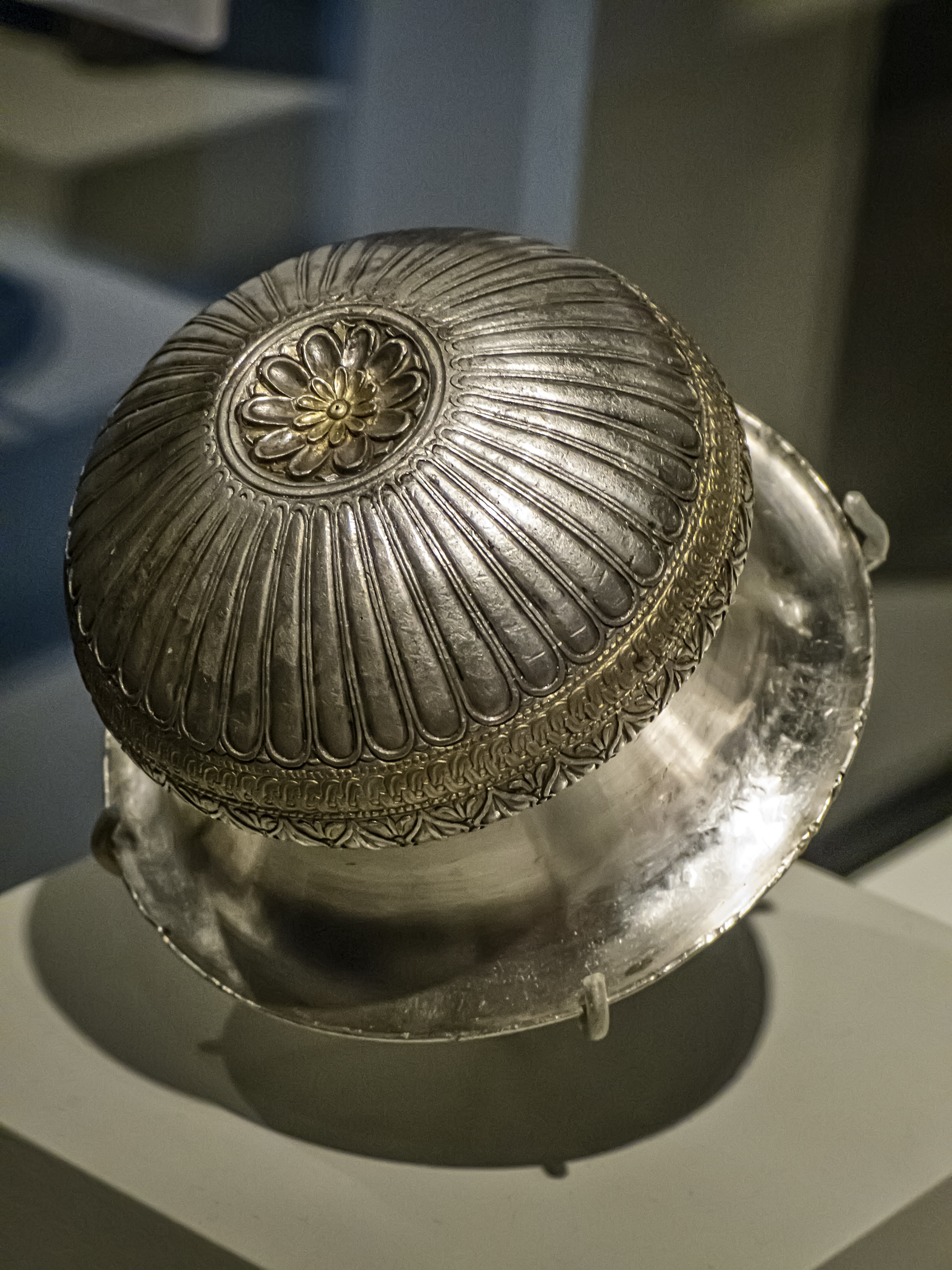
Silver cup from the tomb of Philip II

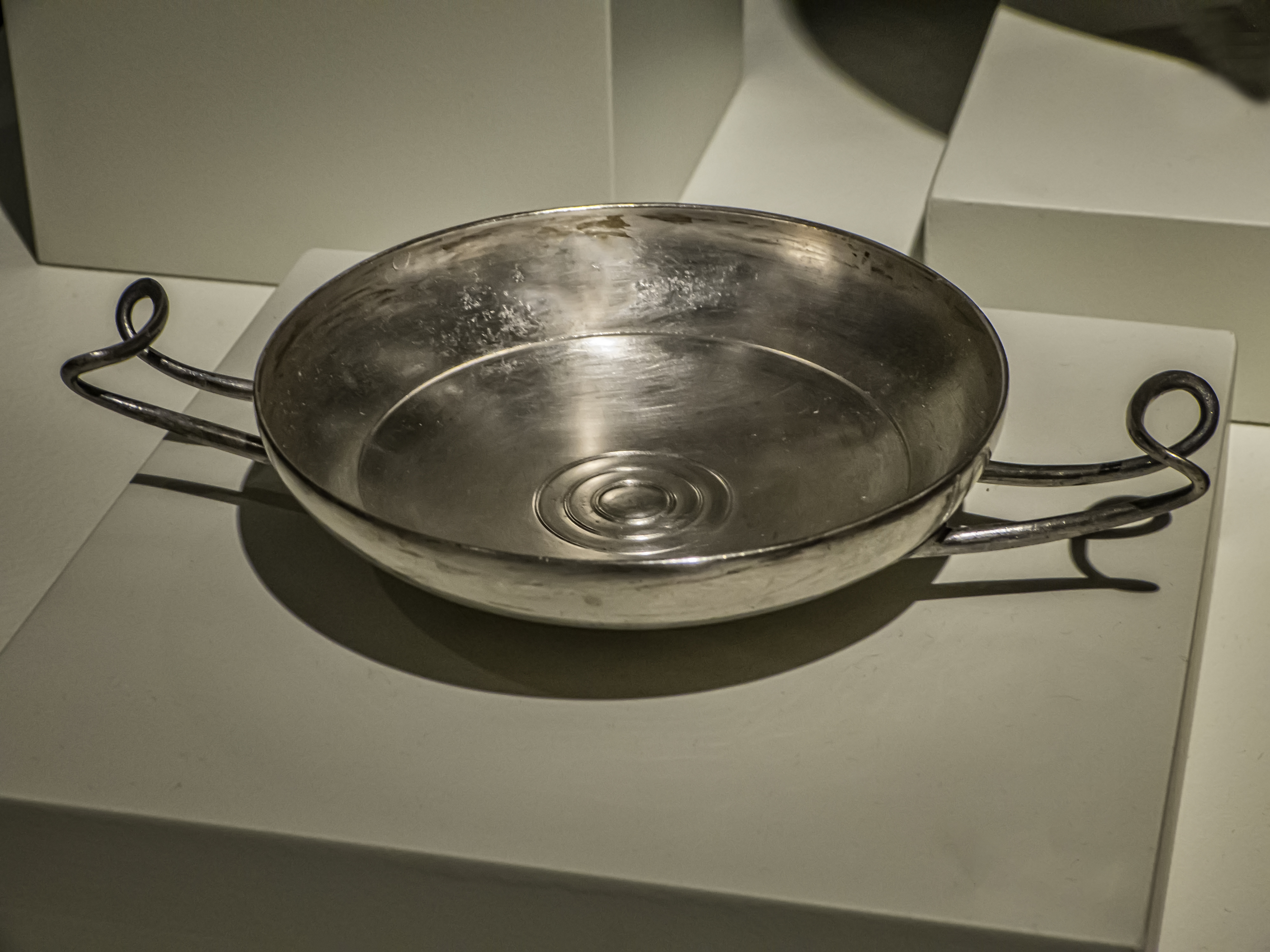
Silver kylix from the tomb of Philip II

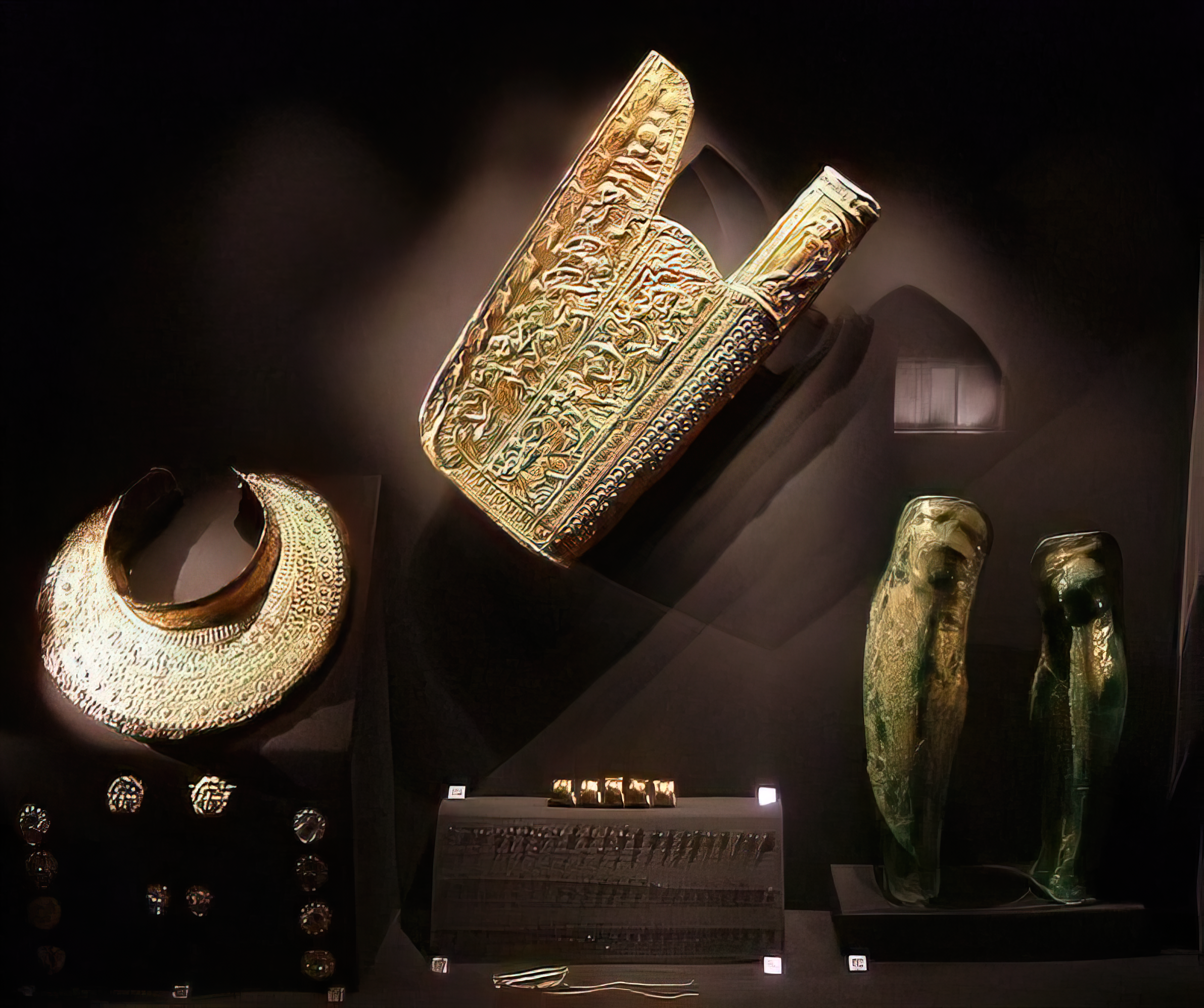
The gold gorytos (combination quiver and bow case), shin-guards and neck armor of Queen Meda of Odessos, Philip II's sixth wife

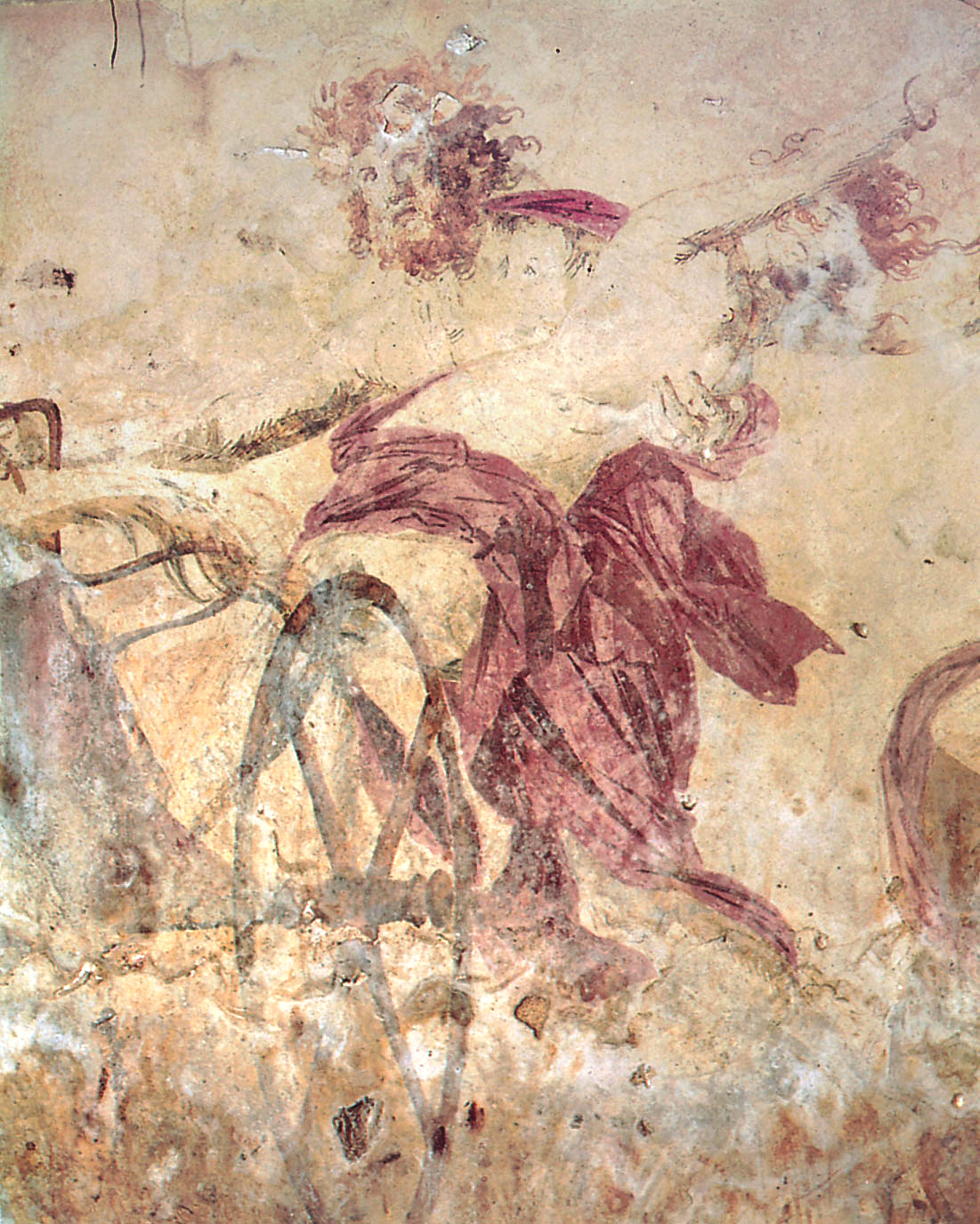
Detail of tomb fresco depicting Hades abducting Persephone
