= Johann Silberschlag =

German Lutheran pastor and scientist

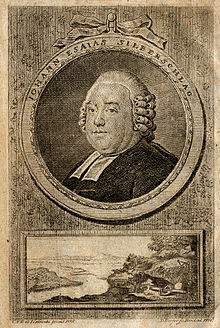
Johann Esaias Silberschlag.

Johann Esaias Silberschlag (16 November 1721 – 22 November 1791) was a German Lutheran pastor (1753-1766) and natural scientist from Aschersleben, Principality of Halberstadt.

In 1760, he became an external member of the Prussian Academy of Sciences in Berlin, Privy Councillor in the newly founded Office for Public Works, Section of Mechanical Engineering and Hydraulic Engineering. In 1780 Silberschlag observed and described the Brocken bow (also called Brocken spectre). In his book Geonetics or Explanation of the Mosaic Creation according to Physical and Mathematical Foundations (Geogonie oder Erklärung der mosaischen Erderschaffung nach physikalischen und mathematischen Grundlagen) he tried to reconcile theology and science.

The lunar crater Silberschlag is named after him.
