= Silver and gold diadem from the tomb of Philip II =

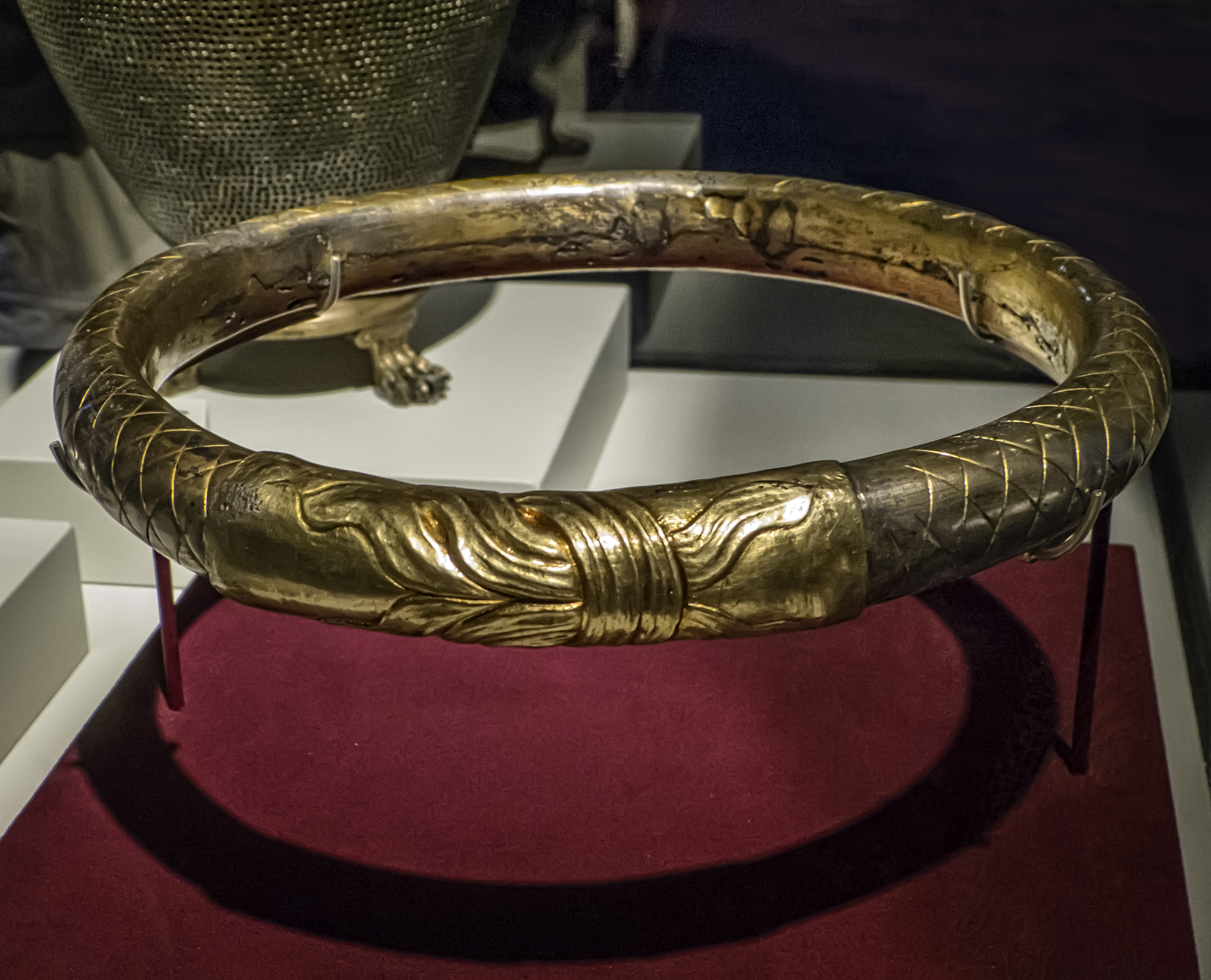
Philip II's diadem.

The silver and gold diadem from the tomb of Philip II is one of the most valuable finds from the antechamber of the royal Macedonian tombs at Vergina, Greece.

== Object history ==
The silver and gold that was used to make King Philip II’s diadem would have originally been mined, processed, and then shipped to a jeweler or expert artisan. During the first millennium B.C. the region around the Balkans and Greece was famed for its precious metals. During this period, most objects were cast in a lost wax process. The lost wax process involves creating a mold with an object made out of wax, the object being an identical rendering of what the finished product should look like. Once the wax is formed it is encased in clay and then baked. While baking, the wax will melt leaving the artisan with a mold. With a completed mold the artisan would be able to fill it with the metals they wished to use. The gilding process that most likely would have been used on this diadem would have involved gold leaf being burnished to the silver. The adhesion of gold with the use of heat helps promote interdiffusion with the underlying metals which usually consist of silver or copper.

While examining the diadem the most notable feature is the Herakles knot located on the front imitating a cloth headband. The knot is a reminder that the Macedonian king was a religious leader and direct descendant of the Greek hero and his father Zeus, king of the gods. On each side of the Herakles knot the metal makes a weave like pattern, continuing the cloth headband imagery. While it is apparent that age has affected some of the gold leaf surrounding the diadem, it amazingly still retains a majority of the gold. While the current diameter is 25 cm, the diadem was made to be adjustable with the two ends that fit into a smaller section in the back.
