= Rima Ariadaeus =

Rille on the Moon

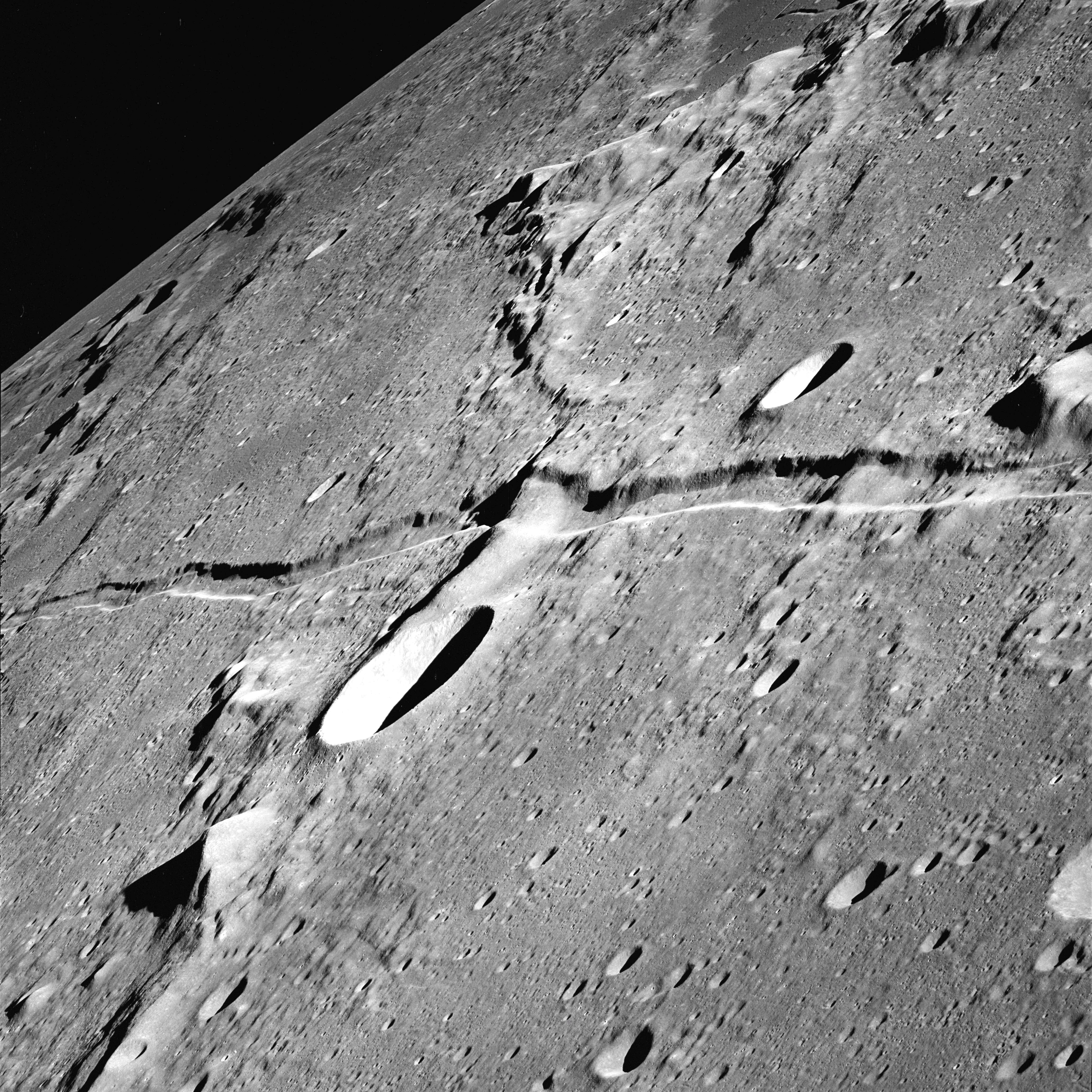
Rima Ariadaeus as photographed from Apollo 10. The large crater south of the rille is Silberschlag, and the dark patch at the top right is the floor of the crater Boscovich.

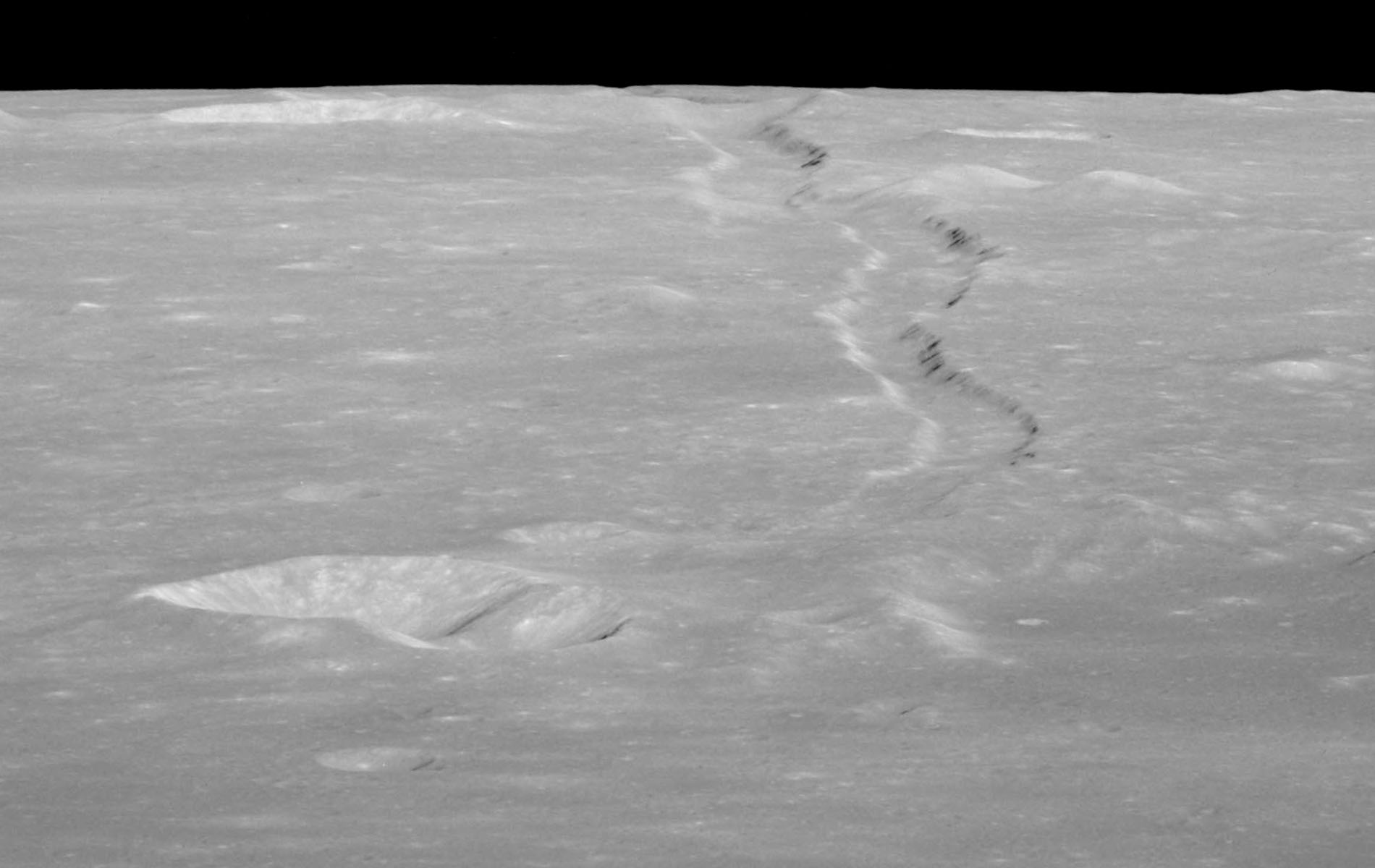
Oblique view also from Apollo 10, with Ariadaeus crater in lower left and Rima Ariadaeus extending to the horizon.

Rima Ariadaeus is a linear rille on the lunar surface, situated at coordinates 6.4°N 14.0°E. Measuring approximately 5 km (3.1 mi) in width and spanning a length of 300 km (186.4 mi), it stretches between Mare Tranquillitatis and Mare Vaporum.

== Formation ==
Some scientists think that the linear rilles might have formed after large impact events, while others believe that the rilles were formed as a surface manifestation of deep-seated dike systems when the Moon was still volcanically active. Rima Ariadaeus is thought to have been formed when a section of the Moon's crust sank down between two parallel fault lines (making it a graben or fault trough). Rima Ariadaeus shows no trace of associated volcanism and is thus considered to be an end member of the sequence where only pure faulting is involved i.e. a linear rille.

== Age ==
The ridges crossing the rille trough of Rima Ariadaeus and the surrounding plains units have been offset by the trough, proving that the ridges are older than the faults. Some craters are cut off by the faults and are, therefore, older. Other craters lie on the wall of the trough and are younger than the faulting. The faulting must be relatively young because so few craters appear to be younger than the faults, and because the edges of the trough appear to be crisp and little affected by slumping and other mass wasting.

== The Moon split claim ==
An Apollo mission photograph of this 300-kilometer-long rille has been used as evidence by the Muslim online community in support of the Islamic account of the Splitting of the Moon. Astronomer Paul Groot of Radboud University, refutes this claim, pointing out that the rille does not encircle the entire surface of the Moon and arguing that its formation is related to the impact that formed the Tycho crater, which is located to the lower right of the feature in the orientation of the photo. NASA notes that the rille is similar to geological faults on Earth and states:

My recommendation is to not believe everything you read on the internet. Peer-reviewed papers are the only scientifically valid sources of information out there. No current scientific evidence reports that the Moon was split into two (or more) parts and then reassembled at any point in the past.

— Brad Bailey, NASA Lunar Science Institute, Staff Scientist, June 21, 2010
