= Silberschlag (crater) =

Crater on the Moon

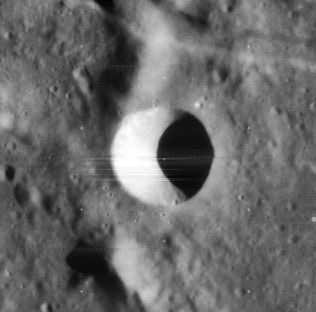
- Lunar Orbiter 4 image
- Coordinates: 6.2°N 12.5°E
- Diameter: 13 km
- Depth: 2.5 km
- Colongitude: 348° at sunrise
- Eponym: Johann Silberschlag

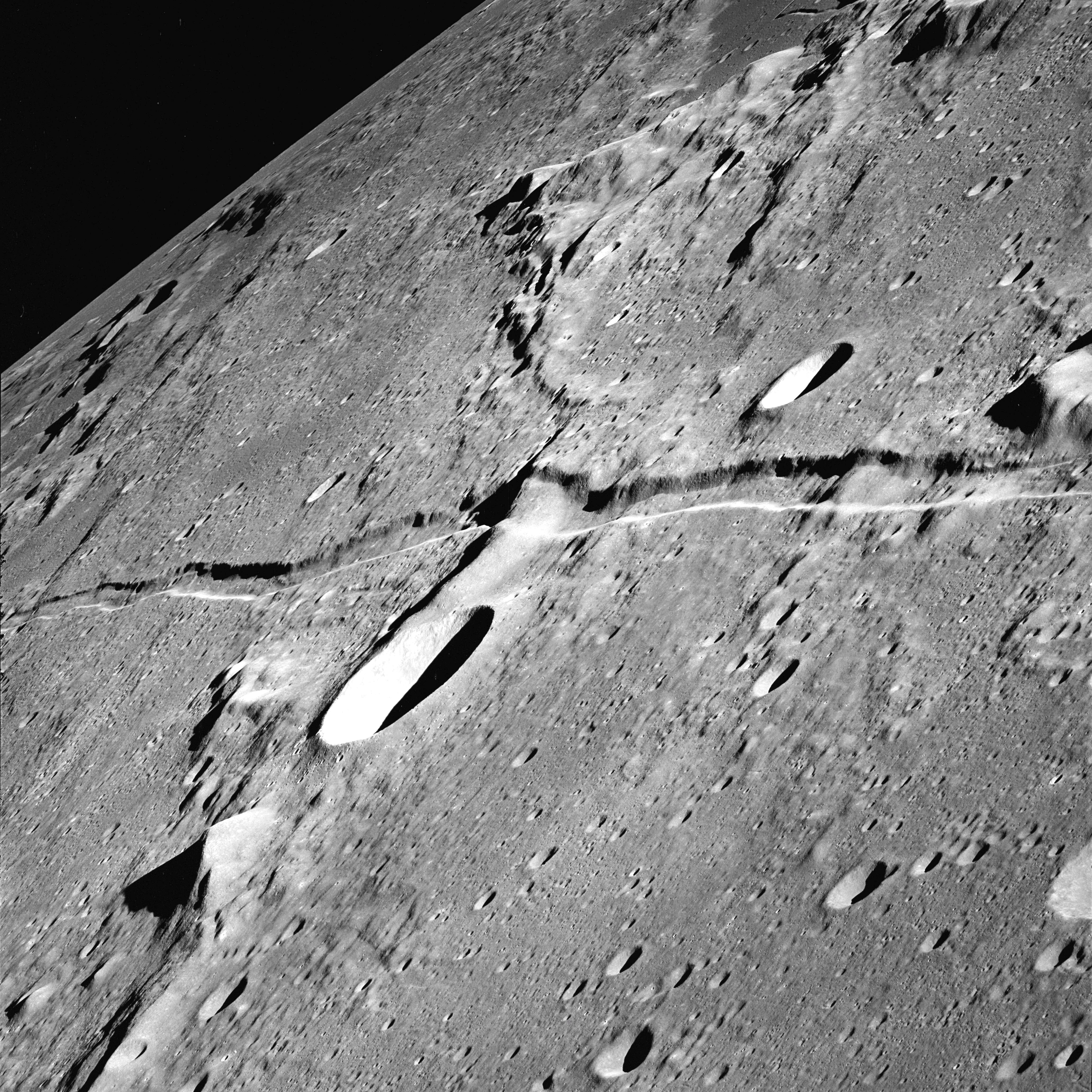
Silberschlag (below and left of center) and Rima Ariadaeus from Apollo 10. NASA photo.

Silberschlag is a small, circular Impact crater in the central portion of the Moon. It was named after German astronomer Johann Silberschlag. T. W. Webb called it a "very brilliant crater-ring". It lies between the craters Agrippa to the southwest and Julius Caesar to the northeast. Silberschlag is bowl-shaped and is joined at the northern rim by a small ridge.

Just to the north is the prominent Rima Ariadaeus, a wide, linear rille that runs toward the east-southeast. This cleft is about 220 kilometers in length, and continues to the edge of Mare Tranquillitatis to the east.

== Satellite craters ==
By convention these features are identified on lunar maps by placing the letter on the side of the crater midpoint that is closest to Silberschlag.

| Silberschlag | Latitude | Longitude | Diameter |
|---|---|---|---|
| A | 6.9° N | 13.2° E | 7 km |
| D | 7.5° N | 11.2° E | 4 km |
| E | 5.2° N | 12.8° E | 4 km |
| G | 5.7° N | 13.8° E | 3 km |
| P | 6.7° N | 12.0° E | 25 km |
| S | 8.0° N | 12.1° E | 34 km |
