= Philip III of Macedon =

King of Macedon from 323 to 317 BC

Philip III
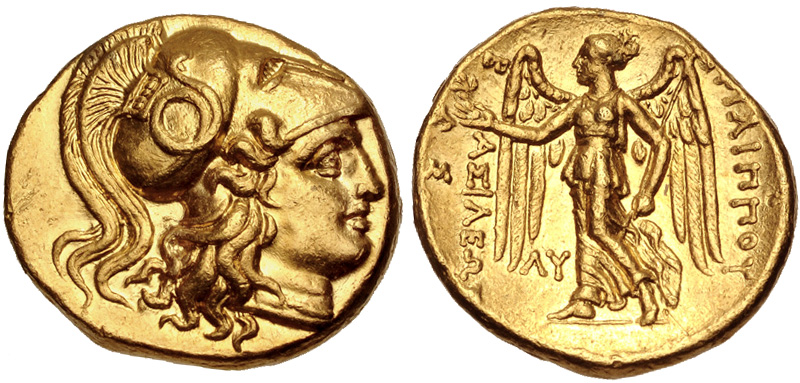
- Gold stater struck in Babylon sometime during Philip's reign. Obv.: helmeted head of Athena facing right; rev.: Nike standing left, holding wreath and stylis.

King of Macedonia
- Reign: 323–317 BC
- Predecessor: Alexander III
- Successor: Alexander IV
- Co-rulers: Alexander IV (323–317 BC)
- Regent: Perdiccas (323–320 BC)

Pharaoh of Egypt
- Reign: 323–317 BC
- Predecessor: Alexander III
Successor
Alexander IV
Royal titulary
Horus name
kꜢ-nḫt mrj-mꜢꜤt
Kanakht merymaat
The strong bull, beloved of Maat
| G5 | E1 D40 mAat mr |
Nebty name
ḥḳꜢ-ḫꜢswt
Heqakhasut
The ruler of foreign countries
| G16 | HqA q Y1 N25 N25 N25 |
Golden Horus
mrjw
Meriu
The beloved one
| G8 | mr i w Z2ss |
Nomen
plwpwysꜣ
Pelupuisa
Philippos

| G39 N5 | p E23 p Z7 i i Aa18 |

King of Persia as Philip I
- Reign: 323–317 BC
- Predecessor: Alexander III
- Successor: Alexander IV
- Born: Arrhidaeus c. 357 BC
- Died: 317 BC
- Spouse: Adea Eurydice
- Dynasty: Argead dynasty
- Father: Philip II
- Mother: Philinna of Larissa
- Religion: Ancient Greek religion

Philip III Arrhidaeus (Ancient Greek: Φίλιππος Ἀρριδαῖος, romanized: Phílippos Arrhidaîos; c. 357 BC – 317 BC) was king of the ancient Greek kingdom of Macedonia from 323 until his execution in 317 BC. He was a son of King Philip II of Macedon by Philinna of Larissa, and thus an elder half-brother of Alexander the Great. Named Arrhidaeus at birth, he assumed the name Philip when he ascended to the throne.

The ancient sources describe Arrhidaeus as having some kind of intellectual impairment, although historians have noted that the Ancient Greeks viewed deafness and muteness as an intellectual disability, and therefore we cannot rule out that Arrhidaeus was not physically disabled. Plutarch was of the view that he became disabled by means of an attempt on his life by his stepmother, Queen Olympias, who wanted to eliminate a possible rival to her son, Alexander, through the employment of pharmaka (drugs/spells); however, most modern authorities doubt the truth of this claim.

Alexander was fond of Arrhidaeus and took him on his campaigns, both to protect his life and to prevent his use as a pawn in any prospective challenge for the throne. After Alexander's death in Babylon in 323 BC, the Macedonian army in Asia proclaimed Arrhidaeus as king; however, he served merely as a figurehead and as the pawn of a series of powerful generals.

== Biography ==
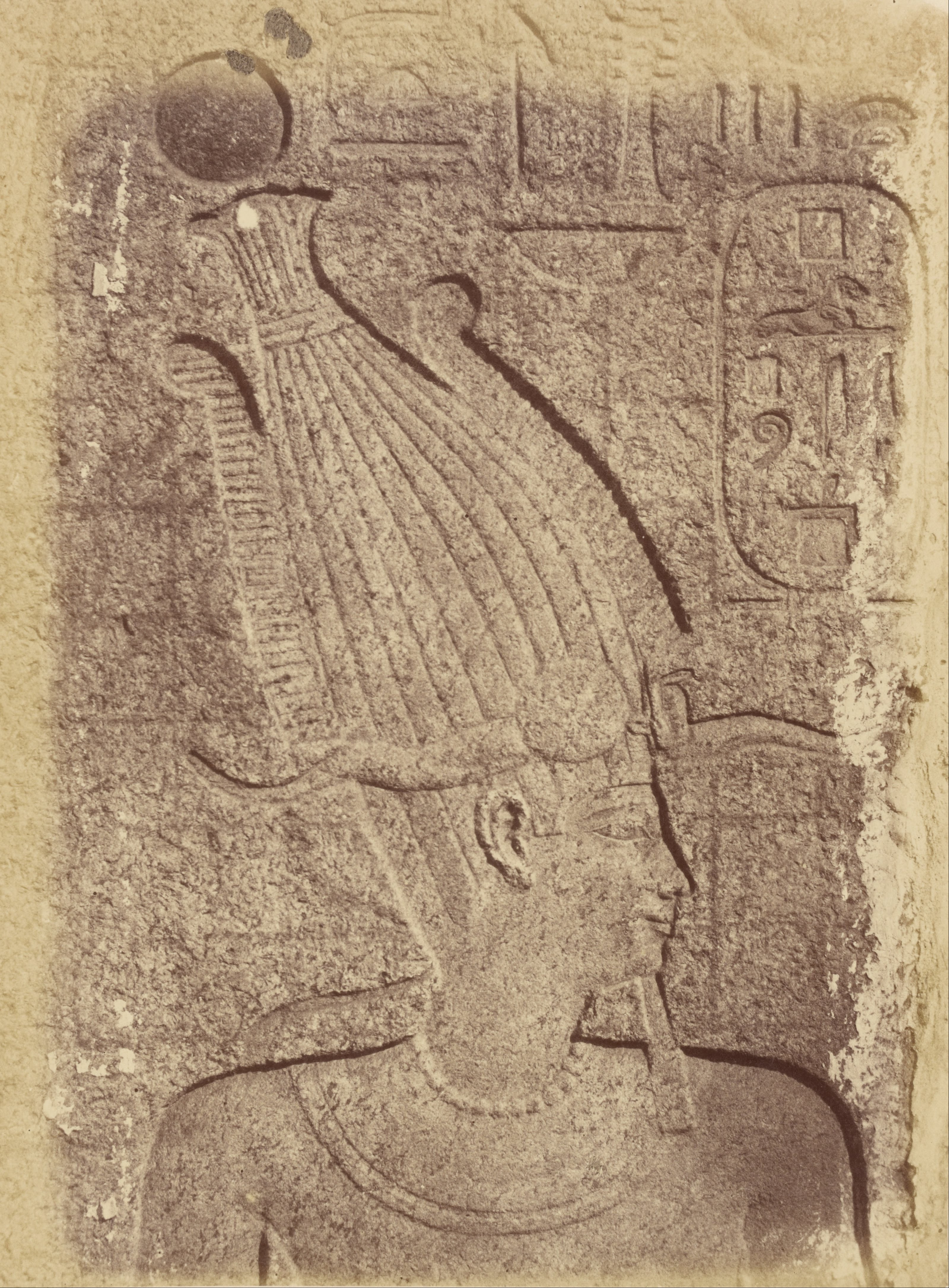
Philip III as pharaoh on a relief in Karnak

According to Athenaeus, Arrhidaeus was born from a legitimate union between Philip II and his wife, Queen Philinna of Larissa. He was, however, labelled in Plutarch's account as an illegitimate, and his mother as a concubine, which scholar Daniel Ogden attributes to:

the colourful propaganda generated in the jostle for power and succession between Phillina and her son on the one side, and Philip's other wives and their children on the other. ... It is implied [by authors favouring Alexander's claim to the throne] either that she [Phillina] was of insufficient status to be mother to the heir, and so challenged Arrhidaeus' claim to succeed in that fashion, or, more directly, it attempted to deny that Arrhidaeus was the son of Philip, or at any rate to call his paternity into question: how could one be sure who his father was, if his mother had been held in common?

Arrhidaeus was older than Alexander, but he appears to not be considered as an heir by Philip II. Nevertheless, when the Persian satrap of Caria, Pixodarus, proposed his daughter in marriage to Alexander, the king declined, offering his son Arrhidaeus as husband instead, and Alexander thought it prudent to block the dynastic union (which might have produced a possible future heir to Philip's domain before Alexander himself did), resulting in considerable irritation on the part of his father (337 BC).

Arrhidaeus's whereabouts during the reign of his brother Alexander are unclear from the extant sources; what is certain is that no civil or military command was given to him in those thirteen years (336–323 BC).

=== Succession ===
Arrhidaeus was in Babylon at the time of Alexander's death on 10 June 323 BC. A succession crisis ensued. Arrhidaeus was the most obvious candidate, but he was mentally disabled and thus unfit to rule. A conflict then arose between Perdiccas, leader of the cavalry, and Meleager, who commanded the phalanx: the first wanted to wait to see if Roxana, Alexander's pregnant wife, would deliver a son, while Meleager objected that Arrhidaeus should be chosen king. A compromise was engineered in which Arrhidaeus would become king with the name of Philip III, and would be joined by Roxana's yet-unborn child as co-sovereign should that child prove to be a male. This eventuality did indeed arise and resulted in Roxana's son, Alexander, becoming with his uncle Phillip co-sovereign on the throne of Macedon. It was immediately decided that Philip Arrhidaeus would reign, but not rule: this was to be the prerogative of the new regent, Perdiccas.

When news arrived in Macedonia that Arrhidaeus had been chosen as king, Cynane, a daughter of Philip II, developed a plan to travel to Asia and offer the new king her daughter Eurydice for his wife. This move was an obvious affront to the regent, whom Cynane had completely bypassed, and to prevent the marriage, Perdiccas sent his brother, Alcetas, to kill Cynane. The reaction among the troops generated by this murder was such that the regent had to give up his opposition to the proposed match and accept the marriage. From that moment on, Philip Arrhidaeus was to be under the sway of his bride, a proud and determined woman bent on substantiating her husband's power.

While most historians are of the view that Arrhidaeus was given no significant authority during his reign as King, historian Alexandra Morris proposes that the figure in charge of transporting Alexander's body to Egypt was in fact his half-brother Arrhidaeus. The histories only mention that a certain "Arrhidaeus" (who was noted to be a satrap) was in charge of the funerary car, and most historians have taken this to be a separate figure, although Morris points out that there is no evidence for this. However, this view has not gained significant support among historians.

=== Regents ===
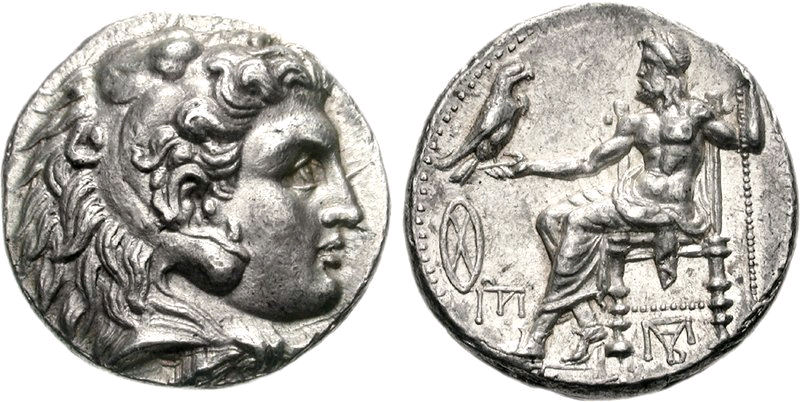
Coin of Philip III Arrhidaeus. 323–317 BC. AR Tetradrachm (17.20 g, 1h). Babylon mint. Struck under Perdikkas, circa 323–320 BC. Head of Herakles left, wearing lion skin headdress / [BASILEWS FILIPPOU], Zeus Aëtophoros seated right; wheel and monogram in left field, monogram below throne.

Eurydice's chance to increase her husband's power came when the first war of the Diadochi sealed the fate of Perdiccas, making a new settlement necessary. An agreement was made at Triparadisus in Syria in 321 BC. Eurydice moved deftly enough to achieve the removal of the first two designated regents, Peithon and Arrhidaeus (a namesake of her husband), but was powerless to block the aspirations of Antipater, whose position proved too powerful, and the latter was made the new regent; Philip Arrhidaeus and Eurydice were forced to follow Antipater back to Macedonia.

The regent died of natural causes the following year, nominating as his successor not his son Cassander, but his friend and lieutenant, Polyperchon. Cassander's refusal to accept his father's decision sparked the Second War of the Diadochi, in which Eurydice saw once again a chance to free Philip from the control of the regent.

An opportunity presented itself in 317 BC when Cassander expelled Polyperchon from Macedonia. Eurydice immediately allied herself with Cassander and persuaded her husband to nominate him as the new regent. Cassander reciprocated by leaving her in full control of the country when he left to campaign in Greece.

=== Death ===
That same year (317 BC), Polyperchon and Olympias allied with her cousin, Aeacides, king of Epirus, and invaded Macedonia. The Macedonian troops refused to fight Olympias, the mother of Alexander. Philip and Eurydice had no choice but to escape, only to be captured at Amphipolis and thrown into prison.

It soon became clear that Philip was too dangerous to be left alive, as Olympias's many enemies saw him as a useful tool against her. She had him executed, while his wife was forced to commit suicide.

The lunar crater Ariadaeus was named after him.

== Tomb ==
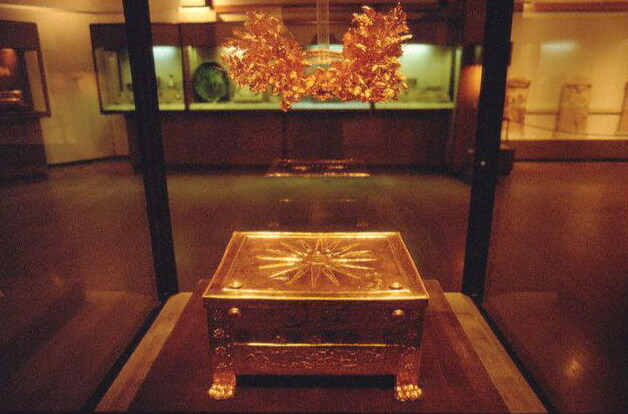
Golden Larnax (Chrysi Larnaka) (with the Sun of Vergina on the lid) that contains the remains (bones) from the burial of King Philip II of Macedonia and the royal golden wreath. Formerly located at the Thessaloniki Archaeological Museum, since 1997 displayed in the underground museum of Vergina, inside the Great Tumulus.

In 1977, excavations near Vergina in northern Greece led to the unearthing of three Macedonian tombs. Tomb II is a two-chambered royal tomb richly decorated with grave goods such as silver vessels, bronze weaponry and bath equipment, and a gold-and-ivory shield. The outer chamber of the tomb contained a golden box with the bones of a woman in her twenties, and the inner chamber contained a gold box with a golden crown and the bones of a man in his forties.

Professor Manolis Andronikos, the chief archaeologist at the site, along with a number of other archaeologists, decided that Tomb II contained the remains of Philip II and his final wife Cleopatra Eurydice due to the rich decoration of the tomb, the age of the skeletal remains, the damage on the male skeleton's right eye socket, and his thigh bone that had suffered trauma. Philip lost his right eye in battle and had been wounded in one leg. However, as the right eye socket was almost entirely missing, the damage could not be specified, and the wound was to the wrong leg. Athenian pottery found in the tomb dates between the last quarter of the fourth century to the early third century BC, while Philip II died in 336 BC. Architectural evidence regarding the vaulted roof and its similarity to Lycian tombs points to a later date, after Alexander the Great's invasion of Asia.

Due to forensic studies in 2015, it is now believed that Philip II was buried in Tomb I. As such, others have proposed Tomb II to contain the remains of Philip Arrhidaeus and his wife Eurydice, due to the time of their death in 317 BC and that Arrhidaeus was known to have received honors at burial.

In Tomb II, greaves that many archaeologists had argued belong to Philip II could also belong to Eurydice or Alexander the Great, according to Antonios Bartsiokas. Bartsiokas, one of the lead authors in the 2015 study identifying Philip as the occupant of Tomb I, explained that Eurydice was a warrior who fought in many battles and could have required greaves. It is also possible that some of Alexander the Great's armor could have been buried at the tomb, as Arrhidaeus wore Alexander's garments when he ascended to the throne in 323 BC, although he did not fight in battles himself. A hand-hammered iron helmet found in Tomb II matches Plutarch's description of Alexander's helmet.

== Arrhidaeus in fiction ==
He appears as one of the main characters in the novel Funeral Games by Mary Renault. In Renault's version, the villainous Cassander slows down his advance on Macedonia to give Olympias enough time to kill Arrhidaeus and Eurydice.

Arrhidaeus is also a main character in Annabel Lyon's novel The Golden Mean. In it, the young Arrhidaeus is tutored by Aristotle while he also mentors his younger half-brother, the future Alexander the Great. Alexander, who is initially disgusted with his brother's inferior intellect, learns to love him before he sets out to conquer the world.

In the Japanese manga series Historié, he was shown as an intellectually disabled child, who became happy when Eumenes made him a toy chariot and became sad when Alexander the Great destroyed his toy. Eumenes later replaced it with a new one, telling him to bury the chariot.

Arrhidaeus is also portrayed in the Indian historical drama series Porus.

Phillip is a prominent character in the Eric Flint novel The Alexander Inheritance and its sequel The Macedonian Hazard. Phillip is portrayed as having an affectionate relationship with Eurydice that is marred by his inability to stand being touched. The appearance of a cruise ship of time travelers a few months after Alexander's death changes history, and prevents Phillip and Eurydice's deaths, although they spend a time as prisoners of Antigonus I Monophthalamus. He is portrayed as having a spectrum disorder, but a photographic memory and a talent for mental arithmetic. His condition improves after sessions from a therapist among the time travelers, along with medical marijuana and other drugs, and fathers a child with Eurydice in the second book.

== Sources ==
- Habicht, Christian (1998). Ελληνιστική Αθήνα [Hellenistic Athens] (in Greek). Athens: Odysseas. ISBN 960-210-310-8.
- Smith, William (editor); Dictionary of Greek and Roman Biography and Mythology, "Arrhidaeus (1)", "Eurydice (3)", Boston, (1867)

Philip III of Macedon Argead dynasty Born: 359 BC Died: 317 BC
Regnal titles
| Preceded by Alexander the Great | King of Macedon; King of Persia; Pharaoh of Egypt; 323 BC – 317 BC | Succeeded by Alexander IV |
