= Lower Macedonia =

Core of the kingdom of Macedon

Macedon (orange) based in Lower Macedonia during the Peloponnesian War around 431 BC, with Athens and the Delian League (yellow), Sparta and Peloponnesian League (red), and the Achaemenid Empire (purple)

Lower Macedonia, (Ancient Greek: Κάτω Μακεδονία, Kato Makedonia) Lower Macedon, Macedonia proper or Emathia were used in Greek antiquity as geographical terms referring to the coastal plain stretching along the coast of the Thermaic Gulf and watered by Haliacmon, Axius and Loudias rivers. Lower Macedonia was the core and defined the center of the kingdom of Macedon.

Its districts were: Emathia, Pieria, Bottiaea, Almopia, Amphaxitis. Aigai, the original capital of Argead Macedon, near modern Vergina, and Pella, the birthplace of Philip II and Alexander the Great and the new capital of the kingdom since the 4th century BC, were in Lower Macedonia, in modern Central Macedonia, in Greece.

Growth of the kingdom of Macedon

== History ==
The kingdom of Macedonia was originally situated along the Haliacmon and Loudias rivers in Lower Macedonia, north of Mount Olympus and east of the Pierian Mountains and the Vermio Mountains. Historian Robert Malcolm Errington suggests that one of the earliest Argead kings established Aigai (modern Vergina) as their capital in the mid-7th century BC. According to Maria Girtzy, the only ancient source referring indirectly to Emathia's boundaries was by Herodotus' testimony that Macedonis lay between Loudias and Haliacmon; thus Emathia (as alternative name to the district of Macedonis) was bounded by Loudias to the north and the plateau of Edessa to the northwest, the valley of Haliacmon to the south along with Vermio Mountains to the southwest, and the Thermaic Gulf to the east. Some ancient geographers give Emathia as the name of a town in the region, or as a name in alternation with Macedon. Pieria took its name from the Pieres, a Thracian tribe that was expelled by the Macedonians in the 8th century BC from their original seats. Sometime, during the Archaic period, Bottiaeans were also expelled by Macedonians from Bottiaea to Bottike.

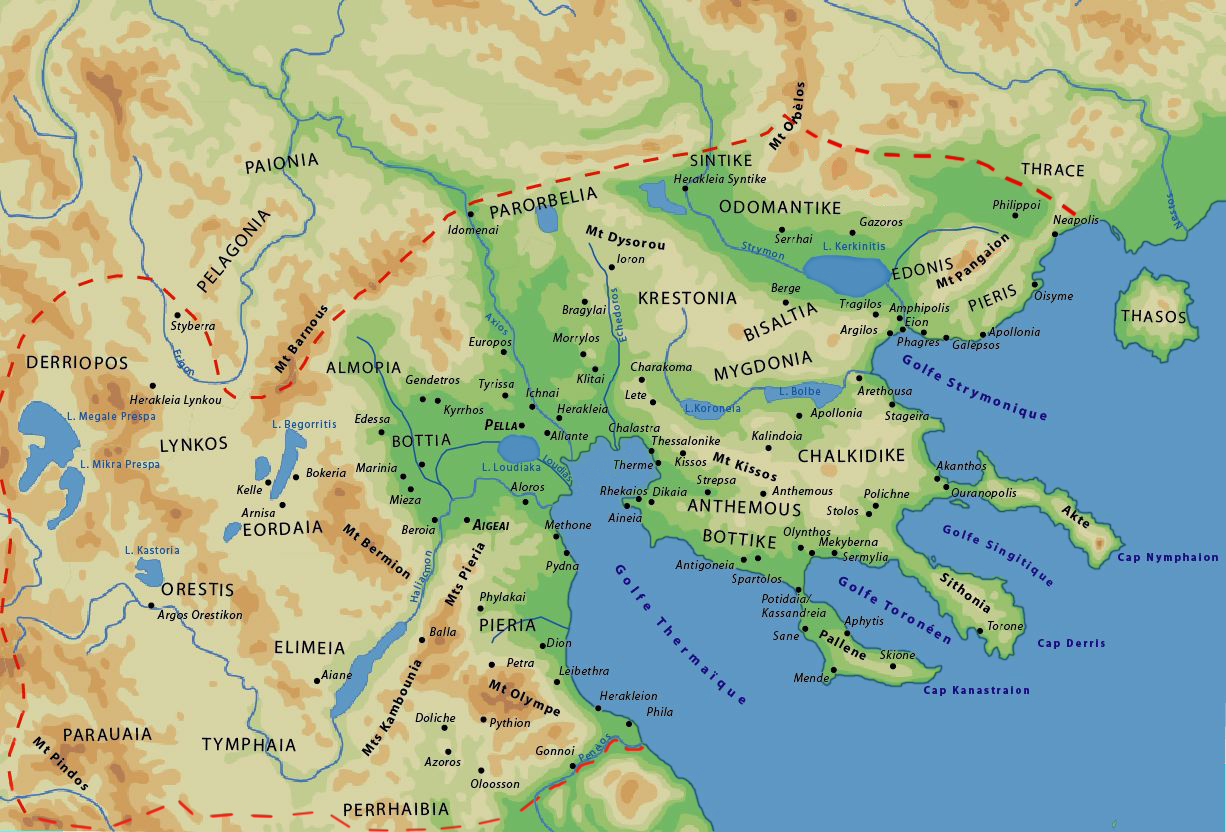
Map of the Kingdom of Macedon after Philip II's expansion in 358 BC.

Almopia was incorporated into the kingdom during the reign of Alexander I (r. 498–454 BC) and Almopes, that originally inhabited the area before, were expelled from the region. Amphaxitis and the eastern districts of Crestonia, Mygdonia and Bisaltia were also added to the kingdom later. There were also included the subregions Anthemous and Crousis in it, which were originally part of Chalcidice. Additionally Eordaea was incorporated to the Argead kindgom earlier than the rest of Upper Macedonia.

The Argeads conquered gradually the Thracian-inhabited areas east of the Axius in the 5th and 4th centuries BC. The regions of Edonis, Sintice, Odomantis and Pieris, conquered by Philip II, were termed in Latin Macedonia Adjecta (Επίκτητος Μακεδονία). West of Lower Macedonia, Upper Macedonia was a geographical and tribal term to describe the upper/western of the two parts in which (together with Lower Macedonia) Macedon was roughly divided.

=== Ancient Macedonian dialect ===
Miltiades Hatzopoulos has suggested that the Macedonian dialect of the 4th century BC spoken in Macedonia proper, as attested in the Pella curse tablet, was a sort of Macedonian 'koine' resulting from the encounter of the idiom of the 'Aeolic'-speaking populations around Mount Olympus and the Pierian Mountains with the Northwest Greek-speaking Argead Macedonians hailing from Argos Orestikon, who founded their kingdom of Lower Macedonia. However, according to Hatzopoulos, B. Helly expanded and improved his own earlier suggestion and presented the hypothesis of a (North-)'Achaean' substratum extending as far north as the head of the Thermaic Gulf, which had a continuous relation, in prehistoric times both in Thessaly and Macedon, with the Northwest Greek-speaking populations living on the other side of the Pindus mountain range, and contacts became cohabitation when the Argead Macedonians completed their wandering from Orestis to Lower Macedonia in the 7th c. BC. According to this hypothesis, Hatzopoulos concludes that the Ancient Macedonian dialect of the historical period, which is attested in inscriptions such as Pella curse tablet, is a sort of koine resulting from the interaction and the influences of various elements, the most important of which are the North-Achaean substratum, the Northwest Greek dialect of the Argead Macedonians, and the Thracian and Phrygian adstrata.

== See also ==
- Regions of ancient Greece
- Ancient Greek geography
- Ancient Macedonian
- Macedonian Greek
- History of Macedonia (ancient kingdom)
- Companion cavalry
- Amphipolis

== Sources ==
- A Manual of Ancient Geography. by Heinrich Kiepert, George Augustin. Macmillan. p 182 ISBN 1-146-40082-9
- The Greek World in the Fourth Century. by Lawrence A. Tritle. p 167 ISBN 0-415-10583-8
- The Classical Gazetteer. Hazlitt. p 210
