= Ancient Macedonian =

Ancient Macedonian may refer to anything related to Macedonia (ancient kingdom), including:

- Ancient Macedonians
- Ancient Macedonian language
- Ancient Macedonian army

== See also ==
- Macedon (disambiguation)
- Antigonid Macedonian army
- Macedonian Greek
- Macedonian (disambiguation)
