= Macedonian–Carthaginian Treaty =

215 BC treaty between Carthage and Macedon

The Macedonian–Carthaginian Treaty was an anti-Roman treaty between Philip V of Macedon and Hannibal, leader of the Carthaginians, which was drawn up after the Battle of Cannae when Hannibal seemed poised to conquer Rome. Philip V, who feared Roman expansion, wanted to ride on the coat tails of the victor in the Second Punic War (218–201 BC). The discovery of this treaty inevitably led to the outbreak of the First Macedonian War (214–205 BC) between Rome and its Greek allies against Macedonia.

== Hannibal ==
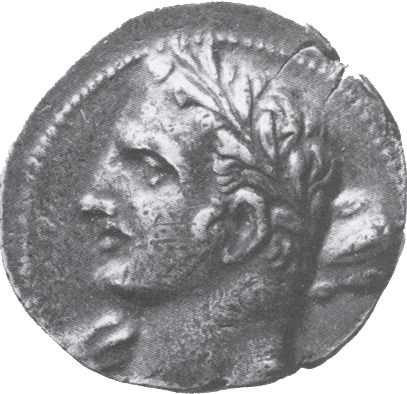
A Carthaginian coin possibly depicting Hannibal as Hercules (i.e., Heracles)

Having left Spain for Italy to wage war against Rome, thus causing the Second Punic War, Hannibal garnered victory after victory in a series of lightning battles against the legions of the burgeoning Italic power.

With the help of his brothers Hasdrubal and Mago, his brother-in-law Hasdrubal the Fair, as well as other Carthaginian commanders, Hannibal managed to keep the Iberian front battling, which forced the Romans to redirect manpower away from the Italic front. The alliance with Philip V was an attempt to open another front in the east, which would have further stretched Roman resources and soldiers.

== Philip V ==
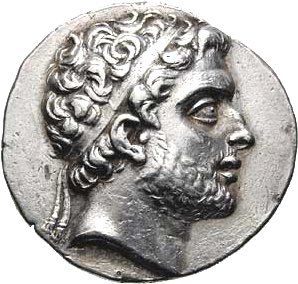
A Macedonian coin depicting Philip V of Macedon.

Roman power had been steadily spreading on the eastern shore of the Adriatic Sea. The Illyrians, once ruled by queen Teuta, had been subjugated under the pretext that they were involved in piracy against Roman merchants. By Philip's time, virtually every city and port on the eastern shore was under Roman influence or protectorate.

The Romans had also provided support to many Greek coastal cities and islands (like Apollonia and Corfu) members of the Aetolian League, which fought against Macedon and the rest of Greece in search of independence. The Seleucid kings of Syria and Attalus I of Pergamon were stirring trouble on the eastern borders of Macedon. Philip V, therefore, needed a powerful ally to halt Rome's expansion towards the Balkans and mitigate the danger on Macedon's western border. Hannibal seemed the perfect candidate.

== Diplomatic mission ==
Livy, the Roman historian of the 1st century, narrates in Ab urbe condita ("Since the founding of the city"), Liber XXIII, 33-39, how Philip, having observed Hannibal's victories, sent a delegation in the summer of 215 BC to meet him on the Italic peninsula to secure an alliance.

Xenophanes' mission to Hannibal, 215 BC

The Greek ambassadors, avoiding the most obvious points of disembarkation from Greece, Brundisium and Tarentum, landed near Cape Lacinium, in Bruttium, by the temple of Juno Lacinia. From there, they moved towards Capua, where Hannibal had set up headquarters, hoping not to be intercepted by Roman legions.

Unable to avoid detection, the delegation was escorted to the praetor Marcus Valerius Laevinus for questioning. The Athenian commander Xenophanes, leader of the expedition, improvised by declaring that the delegation had been sent by king Philip to secure an agreement of amicitiam societatemque (friendship and alliance) with the Roman people.

The praetor welcomed the delegates and sent it on its way to Rome, providing an escort and key tactical information on where the Carthaginians were camped. Armed with this knowledge, the Macedonian delegation reached Hannibal's camp with little effort, completing its assigned mission.

The text of the treaty, recorded by historian Polybius, can be found in the boxes below.

(in Ancient Greek) Polybius' text in T. Büttner-Wobst, Historiae, Leipzig: Teubner (1893).

Ὅρκος, ὃν ἔθετο Ἀννίβας ὁ στρατηγός, Μάγωνος, Μύρκανος, Βαρμόκαρος, καὶ πάντες γερουσιασταὶ Καρχηδονίων οἱ μετ' αὐτοῦ καὶ πάντες Καρχηδόνιοι στρατευόμενοι μετ' αὐτοῦ πρὸς Ξενοφάνη Κλεομάχου Ἀθηναῖον πρεσβευτήν, ὃν ἀπέστειλε πρὸς ἡμᾶς Φίλιππος ὁ βασιλεὺς Δημητρίου ὑπὲρ αὑτοῦ καὶ Μακεδόνων καὶ τῶν συμμάχων[.]

Ἐναντίον Διὸς καὶ Ἥρας καὶ Ἀπόλλωνος, ἐναντίον δαίμονος Καρχηδονίων καὶ Ἡρακλέους καὶ Ἰολάου, ἐναντίον Ἄρεως, Τρίτωνος, Ποσειδῶνος, ἐναντίον θεῶν τῶν συστρατευομένων καὶ Ἡλίου καὶ Σελήνης καὶ Γῆς, ἐναντίον ποταμῶν καὶ λιμένων καὶ ὑδάτων, ἐναντίον πάντων θεῶν ὅσοι κατέχουσι Καρχηδόνα, ἐναντίον θεῶν πάντων ὅσοι Μακεδονίαν καὶ τὴν ἄλλην Ἑλλάδα κατέχουσιν, ἐναντίον θεῶν πάντων τῶν κατὰ στρατείαν, ὅσοι τινὲς ἐφεστήκασιν ἐπὶ τοῦδε τοῦ ὅρκου.

Ἀννίβας ὁ στρατηγὸς εἶπε καὶ πάντες Καρχηδονίων γερουσιασταὶ οἱ μετ' αὐτοῦ καὶ πάντες Καρχηδόνιοι οἱ στρατευόμενοι μετ' αὐτοῦ, ὃ ἂν δοκῇ ὑμῖν καὶ ἡμῖν, τὸν ὅρκον τοῦτον θέσθαι περὶ φιλίας καὶ εὐνοίας καλῆς, φίλους καὶ οἰκείους καὶ ἀδελφούς,

- ἐφ' ᾧτ' εἶναι σῳζομένους ὑπὸ βασιλέως Φιλίππου καὶ Μακεδόνων καὶ ὑπὸ τῶν ἄλλων Ἑλλήνων, ὅσοι εἰσὶν αὐτῶν σύμμαχοι, κυρίους Καρχηδονίους καὶ Ἀννίβαν τὸν στρατηγὸν καὶ τοὺς μετ' αὐτοῦ καὶ τοὺς Καρχηδονίων ὑπάρχους, ὅσοι τοῖς αὐτοῖς νόμοις χρῶνται, καὶ Ἰτυκαίους, καὶ ὅσαι πόλεις καὶ ἔθνη Καρχηδονίων ὑπήκοα, καὶ τοὺς στρατιώτας καὶ τοὺς συμμάχους, καὶ πάσας πόλεις καὶ ἔθνη, πρὸς ἅ ἐστιν ἡμῖν ἥ τε φιλία τῶν ἐν Ἰταλίᾳ καὶ Κελτίᾳ καὶ ἐν τῇ Λιγυστίνῃ, καὶ πρὸς οὕστινας ἡμῖν ἂν γένηται φιλία καὶ συμμαχία ἐν ταύτῃ τῇ χώρᾳ.
- ἔσται δὲ καὶ Φίλιππος ὁ βασιλεὺς καὶ Μακεδόνες καὶ τῶν ἄλλων Ἑλλήνων οἱ σύμμαχοι, σῳζόμενοι καὶ φυλαττόμενοι ὑπὸ Καρχηδονίων τῶν συστρατευομένων καὶ ὑπὸ Ἰτυκαίων καὶ ὑπὸ πασῶν πόλεων καὶ ἐθνῶν ὅσα ἐστὶ Καρχηδονίοις ὑπήκοα, καὶ συμμάχων καὶ στρατιωτῶν, καὶ ὑπὸ πάντων ἐθνῶν καὶ πόλεων ὅσα ἐστὶν ἐν Ἰταλίᾳ καὶ Κελτίᾳ καὶ Λιγυστίνῃ, καὶ ὑπὸ τῶν ἄλλων, ὅσοι ἂν γένωνται σύμμαχοι ἐν τοῖς κατ' Ἰταλίαν τόποις τούτοις.
- οὐκ ἐπιβουλεύσομεν ἀλλήλοις οὐδὲ λόχῳ χρησόμεθα ἐπ' ἀλλήλοις, μετὰ πάσης δὲ προθυμίας καὶ εὐνοίας ἄνευ δόλου καὶ ἐπιβουλῆς ἐσόμεθα πολέμιοι τοῖς πρὸς Καρχηδονίους πολεμοῦσι χωρὶς βασιλέων καὶ πόλεων καὶ λιμένων, πρὸς οὓς ἡμῖν εἰσιν ὅρκοι καὶ φιλίαι.
- ἐσόμεθα δὲ καὶ ἡμεῖς πολέμιοι τοῖς πολεμοῦσι πρὸς βασιλέα Φίλιππον χωρὶς βασιλέων καὶ πόλεων καὶ ἐθνῶν, πρὸς οὓς ἡμῖν εἰσιν ὅρκοι καὶ φιλίαι.
- ἔσεσθε δὲ καὶ ἡμῖν σύμμαχοι πρὸς τὸν πόλεμον, ὅς ἐστιν ἡμῖν πρὸς Ῥωμαίους, ἕως ἂν ἡμῖν καὶ ὑμῖν οἱ θεοὶ διδῶσι τὴν εὐημερίαν. βοηθήσετε δὲ ἡμῖν, ὡς ἂν χρεία ᾖ καὶ ὡς ἂν συμφωνήσωμεν.
- ποιησάντων δὲ τῶν θεῶν εὐημερίαν ἡμῖν κατὰ τὸν πόλεμον τὴν πρὸς Ῥωμαίους καὶ τοὺς συμμάχους αὐτῶν, ἂν ἀξιῶσι Ῥωμαῖοι συντίθεσθαι περὶ φιλίας, συνθησόμεθα, ὥστ' εἶναι πρὸς ὑμᾶς τὴν αὐτὴν φιλίαν,ἐφ' ᾧτε μὴ ἐξεῖναι αὐτοῖς ἄρασθαι πρὸς ὑμᾶς μηδέποτε πόλεμον, μηδ' εἶναι Ῥωμαίους κυρίους Κερκυραίων μηδ' Ἀπολλωνιατῶν καὶ Ἐπιδαμνίων μηδὲ Φάρου μηδὲ Διμάλης καὶ Παρθίνων μηδ' Ἀτιντανίας. ἀποδώσουσι δὲ καὶ Δημητρίῳ τῷ Φαρίῳ τοὺς οἰκείους πάντας, οἵ εἰσιν ἐν τῷ κοινῷ τῶν Ῥωμαίων.
- ἐὰν δὲ αἴρωνται Ῥωμαῖοι πρὸς ὑμᾶς πόλεμον ἢ πρὸς ἡμᾶς, βοηθήσομεν ἀλλήλοις εἰς τὸν πόλεμον, καθὼς ἂν ἑκατέροις ᾖ χρεία.
- ὁμοίως δὲ καὶ ἐάν τινες ἄλλοι χωρὶς βασιλέων καὶ πόλεων καὶ ἐθνῶν, πρὸς ἃ ἡμῖν εἰσιν ὅρκοι καὶ φιλίαι.
- ἐὰν δὲ δοκῇ ἡμῖν ἀφελεῖν ἢ προσθεῖναι πρὸς τόνδε τὸν ὅρκον, ἀφελοῦμεν ἢ προσθήσομεν ὡς ἂν ἡμῖν δοκῇ ἀμφοτέροις.

[Biblioteca Apostolica Vaticana, Cod. Urb. folio 96 exc. ant. p. 193.]

(in English) Polybius' text in E. S. Shuckburgh (transl.), Histories, Macmillan (1889), pp. 516-7.

This is a sworn treaty made between Hannibal, Mago, Barmocarus, and such members of the Carthaginian Gerousia as were present, and all Carthaginians serving in his army, on the one part; and Xenophanes, son of Cleomachus of Athens, sent to us by King Philip, as his ambassador, on behalf of himself, the Macedonians, and their allies, on the other part.

The oath is taken in the presence of Zeus, Here, and Apollo: of the god of the Carthaginians, Hercules, and Iolaus: of Ares, Triton, Poseidon: of the gods that accompany the army, and of the sun, moon, and earth: of rivers, harbours, waters: of all the gods who rule Carthage: of all the gods who rule Macedonia and the rest of Greece: of all the gods of war that are witnesses to this oath.

Hannibal, general, and all the Carthaginian senators with him, and all Carthaginians serving in his army, subject to our mutual consent, proposes to make this sworn treaty of friendship and honourable good-will. Let us be friends, close allies, and brethren, on the conditions herein following:

- Let the Carthaginians, as supreme, Hannibal their chief general and those serving with him, all members of the Carthaginian dominion living under the same laws, as well as the people of Utica, and the cities and tribes subject to Carthage, and their soldiers and allies, and all cities and tribes in Italy, Celt-land, and Liguria, with whom we have a compact of friendship, and with whomsoever in this country we may hereafter form such compact, be supported by King Philip and the Macedonians, and all other Greeks in alliance with them.
- On their parts also King Philip and the Macedonians, and such other Greeks as are his allies, shall be supported and protected by the Carthaginians now in this army, and by the people of Utica, and by all cities and tribes subject to Carthage, both soldiers and allies, and by all allied cities and tribes in Italy, Celt-land, and Liguria, and by all others in Italy as shall hereafter become allies of the Carthaginians.
- We will not make plots against, nor lie in ambush for, each other; but in all sincerity and good-will, without reserve or secret design, will be enemies to the enemies of the Carthaginians, saving and excepting those kings, cities, and ports with which we have sworn agreements and friendships.
- And we, too, will be enemies to the enemies of King Philip, saving and excepting those kings, cities, and tribes, with which we have sworn agreements and friendships.
- You shall be friends to us in the war in which we now are engaged against the Romans, till such time as the gods give us and you the victory: and you shall assist us in all ways that be needful, and in whatsoever way we may mutually determine.
- And when the gods have given us victory in our war with the Romans and their allies, if Hannibal shall deem it right to make terms with the Romans, these terms shall include the same friendship with you, made on these conditions: first, the Romans not to be allowed to make war on you; second, not to have power over Corcyra, Apollonia, Epidamnum, Pharos, Dimale, Parthini, nor Atitania; (3) to restore to Demetrius of Pharos all those of his friends now in the dominion of Rome.
- If the Romans ever make war on you or on us we will aid each other in such war, according to the need of either.
- So also if any other nation whatever does so, always excepting kings, cities, and tribes, with whom we have sworn agreements and friendships.
- If we decide to take away from, or add to this sworn treaty, we will so take away, or add thereto, only as we both agree.

== The capture ==
Once the treaty was agreed upon, the delegation and the Carthaginian officers Mago, Gisgo and Bostar undertook the return journey to Macedonia to obtain Philip's signature. However, while crossing the sea they were intercepted by Roman warships led by consul Lucius Valerius Flaccus, who did not believe Xenophanes' cover story and ordered a search of their ship and its occupants. The discovery of Punic apparel and of the treaty itself prompted Flaccus to send the delegation as prisoners to Rome on five ships, so as to keep them separate and limit the risk of escape. After a brief stop in Cumae for further interrogation by consul Tiberius Sempronius Gracchus, the delegation faced the Senate and was incarcerated. Only one member managed to escape and return to Macedon, where he was unable to fully recollect the terms of the treaty and recount them to king Philip. Therefore, Philip had to send a second delegation to meet Hannibal and draft the agreement anew.

In response to the threat presented by the Macedonian-Carthaginian alliance, the Senate decreed that twenty-five ships be added to the contingent already under Flaccus' command and sent to the southeast, where they were expected to monitor Philip's movements.

In practice, because summer had elapsed by the time the second delegation reached Hannibal and concluded a new treaty, its terms were never executed (military operations were usually suspended in winter). Furthermore, the discovery of the alliance by the Roman Senate nullified the element of surprise, which greatly diminished the treaty's value in the context of the Second Punic War. Nevertheless, the discovery of the treaty led to debates in the Senate about how to handle Macedonia, and eventually to the outbreak of the First Macedonian War (214-205 BC). This conflict was fought largely in Illyria, but also included a Greek theater of operations due to Rome's allies there simultaneously waging war against Macedonia.

== See also ==
- Rome
- Carthage
- Second Punic War
