= Macedonian Greek =

Macedonian Greek or Greek Macedonian may refer to someone or something from, or related to:

- Macedonia (ancient kingdom), an ancient Greek kingdom, including:
  - Ancient Macedonians
  - Ancient Macedonian Greek
- Macedonia (Greece), a geographic region of modern Greece, including:
  - Macedonians (Greeks)
  - Central Macedonia
  - Western Macedonia
  - Eastern Macedonia Thrace

== See also ==
- Macedonian dynasty
- Greeks in North Macedonia
