= Expansion of Macedonia under Philip II =

Rise of Macedon

- The Kingdom of Macedon in 336 BC
Date	359–336 BC
Location	Thrace, Illyria, Paeonia, Greece, Asia Minor
Result	Macedonian hegemony establishment of League of Corinth

Belligerents
Macedon	Illyrians; Paeonia; Phocis; Chalkidian League; Odrysian kingdom; Getae; Triballi; Scythians; Athens; Thebes; Achaemenid Empire

Commanders and leaders
Philip II (WIA); Parmenion; Alexander III	Bardylis †; Agis; Lyppeius; Cetriporis; Grabos II; Onomarchus; Kersebleptes; Pleuratus; Menelaus of Pelagonia; Demosthenes; Memnon of Rhodes

Under the reign of Philip II (359–336 BC), the Argead kingdom of Macedonia, initially at the periphery of classical Greek affairs, came to dominate Ancient Greece in the span of less than 25 years, largely thanks to the character and policies of its king. In addition to utilising effective diplomacy and marriage alliances to achieve his political aims, Philip II was responsible for reforming the ancient Macedonian army into an effective fighting force. The Macedonian phalanx became the hallmark of the Macedonian army during his reign, combined with Companion cavalry, hypaspists and light infantry. His army and engineers also made extensive use of siege engines. Chief among Philip's Thracian enemies was the ruler Kersebleptes, who may have coordinated a temporary alliance with Athens. In a series of campaigns stretching from 356 to 340 BC, Philip II managed to ultimately subjugate Kersebleptes as a tributary vassal, conquering much of Thrace in the process. Philip II also fought against the Illyrian king Bardylis, who threatened Macedonia proper, and against Grabos II and Pleuratus in Illyria (centred in modern-day Albania). In his newly conquered territories, he founded new cities such as Philippi (modern Filippoi, Greece), Philippopolis (modern Plovdiv, Bulgaria), Herakleia Sintike (modern Rupite, Bulgaria), and Herakleia Lynkestis (modern Bitola, North Macedonia).

Philip II eventually campaigned against the city-state of Athens and her allies in the Aegean region, as well as Thebes after the decline of its hegemony in mainland Greece. In the defence of the Amphictyonic League of Delphi and in conjunction with the Thessalian League, Macedonia became a key player in the Third Sacred War (356–346 BC), defeating the Phocians, commanded by Onomarchus, at the Battle of Crocus Field in 352 BC. While poised to launch a direct assault on Athens in 346 BC, the Macedonian king was met with an Athenian embassy that arranged the Peace of Philocrates. As a result, Macedonia and Athens became allies, yet Athens was forced to relinquish its claims to the city of Amphipolis (in modern-day Central Macedonia).

The Peace of Philocrates eventually broke down as hostilities reignited between Athens and Macedonia. Demosthenes, an Athenian statesman who was partially responsible for engineering the peace treaty, delivered a series of speeches encouraging his fellow Athenians to oppose Philip II. The Macedonian hegemony over Greece was secured by their victory over a Greek coalition army led by Athens and Thebes, at the Battle of Chaeronea in 338 BC. In the aftermath the federation of Greek states known as the League of Corinth was established, which brought these former Greek adversaries and others into a formal alliance with Macedonia. The League of Corinth elected Philip as strategos (i.e. commander-in-chief) for a planned invasion of the Achaemenid Empire of Persia. However, Philip was assassinated by his bodyguard Pausanias of Orestis before he could begin the campaign, a task that instead fell to his son and successor, Alexander the Great.

== Sources ==
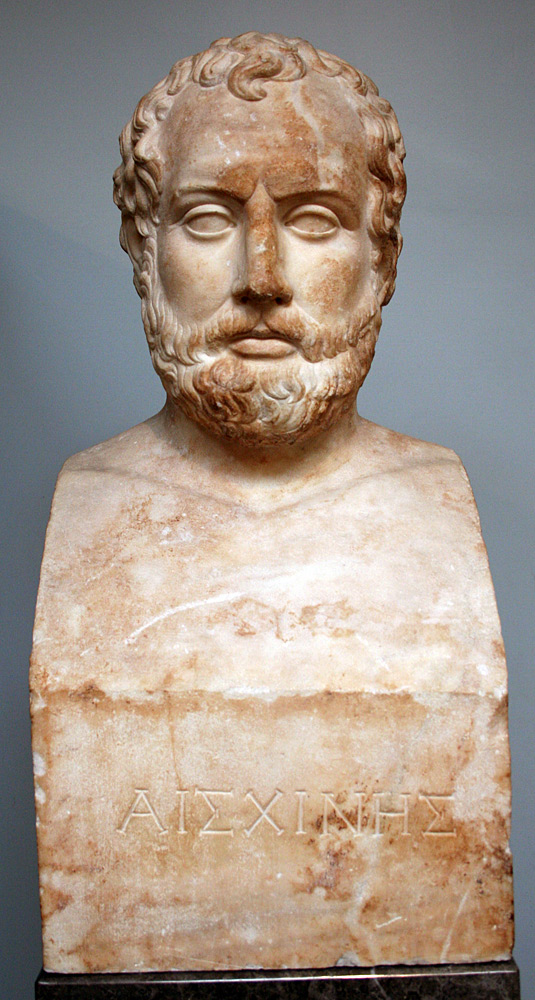
Marble bust of the Athenian statesman Aeschines, 4th century BC, British Museum

Intact and relatively detailed histories of Greece, such as Herodotus's The Histories, Thucydides's History of the Peloponnesian War, and Xenophon's Hellenica cover the period from roughly 500–362 BC. No extant history specifically covers the relevant period of Greek history (359–336 BC), although it is included within various universal histories. The main source for the period is Diodorus Siculus's Bibliotheca historica, written in the 1st century BC, which is therefore a secondary source. Diodorus devotes Book XVI to the period of Philip's reign, but the action is much compressed, and due to the scope of the work, this book also contains details of happenings during the same period elsewhere in the ancient world. Diodorus is often derided by modern historians for his style and inaccuracies, but he preserves many details of the ancient period found nowhere else. Diodorus worked primarily by epitomising the works of other historians, omitting many details where they did not suit his purpose, which was to illustrate moral lessons from history; his account of the period therefore contains many gaps.

Another surviving work for the period is Justin's epitome of Pompeius Trogus's Philippic History. Justin's epitomised history is also much condensed from the no-longer-extant original and covers not only Philip's reign, but also the history of Macedon before him, the exploits of Philip's son, Alexander the Great, and his diadochi successors during the Hellenistic period. These surviving histories are complemented by fragments of other histories, including Theopompus's 58-volume history of Philip (which was the source for much of Trogus's Philippic History) and by contemporary epigraphic sources.

Outside the brief notices of Philip's exploits which occur in Diodorus and Justin, further details of his campaigns (and indeed the period in general) can be found in the orations of Athenian statesmen, primarily Demosthenes and Aeschines, which have survived intact. Since these speeches were never intended to be historical material, they must be treated with great circumspection, particularly given the identity of the authors. Demosthenes and Aeschines have been described as "a couple of liars, neither of whom can be trusted to have told the truth in any matter in which it was remotely in his interest to lie". For instance, the Peace of Philocrates (made in 346 BC) is known primarily from their speeches (both called On the False Embassy), made in 343 BC, when Demosthenes prosecuted Aeschines for his involvement in making the peace treaty. In his speech, Aeschines poses as the champion of the peace treaty, when he had in fact opposed making peace; conversely, Demosthenes, who had been a proponent of peace in 346 BC represents himself as part of the "war-party". The arguments made in the speeches therefore refer to the political situation in 343 BC and not the situation when the treaty was made, which makes teasing out the actual historical threads rather difficult.

== Background ==
=== Greece in the early 4th century BC ===
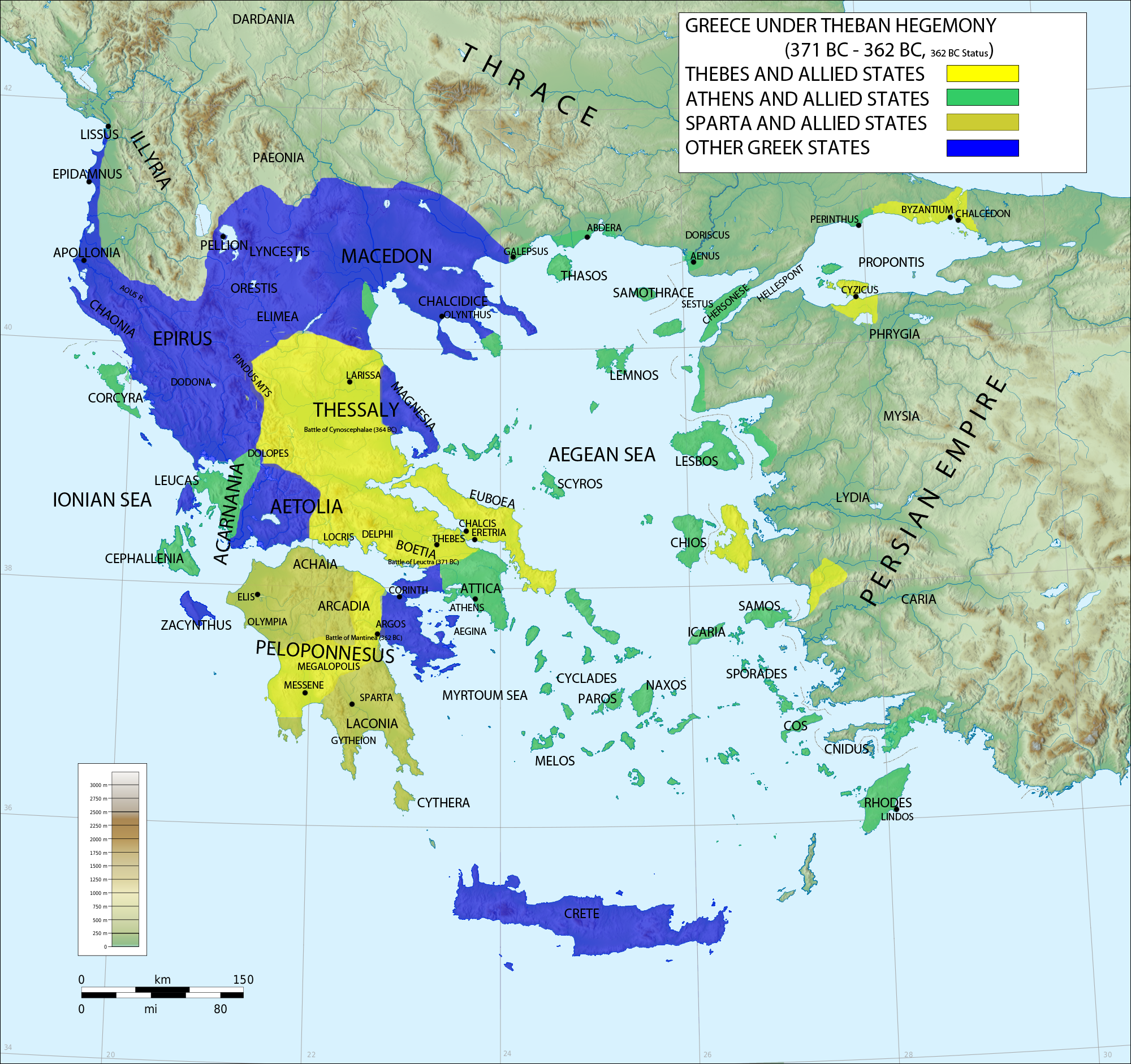
The Theban hegemony; power-blocks in Greece in the decade up to 362 BC.

In the aftermath of the Peloponnesian War, the militaristic city-state of Sparta had been able to impose a hegemony over the heartland of Classical Greece (the Peloponessus and mainland Greece south of Thessaly), the states of this area having been severely weakened by the war. This state of affairs was resented by many of the Greek city-states, which had traditionally been ferociously independent, and led directly to the Corinthian War of 395–387 BC. Sparta emerged from this conflict with its hegemony intact, though only as a result of Persian intervention, which led to the so-called King's Peace. The fragility of Spartan dominance had been demonstrated however, and in the next decade, the Thebans would revolt against Sparta. The Spartans were unable to successfully quell the revolt, leading to de facto Theban independence. Then, after several years of desultory conflict, the Thebans finally met the Spartans in open battle at Leuctra (371 BC), and under the leadership of Epaminondas inflicted an unprecedented defeat on the Spartan army, killing the Spartan king Cleombrotus I in the process.

Following up on this victory, Epaminondas invaded Peloponnesus in 370 BC and began dismantling the basis of Spartan dominance. Spartan power rested on the forced labour of the helots of Messenia, which allowed the entire male Spartan population to dedicate themselves to warfare. This focused military training system had previously enabled Sparta to exert power out of proportion to its small population. However, after their losses at Leuctra, the Spartans were unable to resist Epaminondas's invasion, and he marched into Messenia and liberated the helots, thereby permanently crippling Sparta. The Thebans then began to extend their influence over Greece, effectively replacing the Spartan hegemony with their own. The Theban generals Pelopidas and Epaminondas campaigned all over Greece for the next 9 years to further Theban power and influence. In 362 BC, Epaminondas's fourth invasion of the Peloponnesus, which reached its climax at the Battle of Mantinea, brought almost every state in Greece into the conflict, on one side or the other. Although the Thebans and their allies were victorious at Mantinea, Epaminondas was killed, and Theban losses were heavy. Xenophon, summing up his account of Mantinea, suggests that:

When these things had taken place, the opposite of what all men believed would happen was brought to pass. For since well-nigh all the people of Greece had come together and formed themselves in opposing lines, there was no one who did not suppose that if a battle were fought, those who proved victorious would be the rulers and those who were defeated would be their subjects; but the deity so ordered ... that while each party claimed to be victorious, neither was found to be any better off ... but [that] there was even more confusion and disorder in Greece after the battle than before.

— Xenophon

The years of conflict which resulted from the Theban attempts to reorganise Greece had left much of the country war-weary and exhausted; a general peace (excluding only a recalcitrant Sparta) was therefore concluded between all the states of Greece in the aftermath of Mantinea. With the death of Epaminondas and significant loss of manpower at Mantinea, the Thebans returned to their more traditional defensive policy, and within a few years, Athens had replaced them at the pinnacle of the Greek political system, and Theban influence faded quickly in the rest of Greece. It was the Athenians, and their second League, who would be Macedon's main rivals for control of the lands of the north Aegean, and a major theme during the period was the regular state of war between Macedon and Athens.

Expansion of Macedon under Philip II of Macedon

=== Philip's accession ===
In 360 BC, the Macedonian army under Perdiccas III had been defeated in battle by the Illyrians; Perdiccas and 4,000 troops had been killed. The Illyrians prepared to invade Macedon; meanwhile, the Paionians were ravaging Macedonian territory, the Thracians were preparing to invade in support of the pretender Pausanias, as were the Athenians, in support of a different pretender, Argeus. In short, Macedon was in another of its periodic crises.

The nominal heir of Perdiccas, his son Amyntas IV, was at this time still an infant. Philip, the oldest surviving son of Amyntas III, was the obvious candidate to rule Macedon and was acclaimed by the army, probably as king. It is also possible that he was initially acclaimed as regent for his nephew Amyntas IV, and later usurped the throne, although if so, he did not harm Amyntas. Either way, Philip II became king by 359 BC, and began energetically attempting to save Macedon from destruction.

== Macedonian recovery (359–358 BC) ==
=== Reconstruction of the army ===
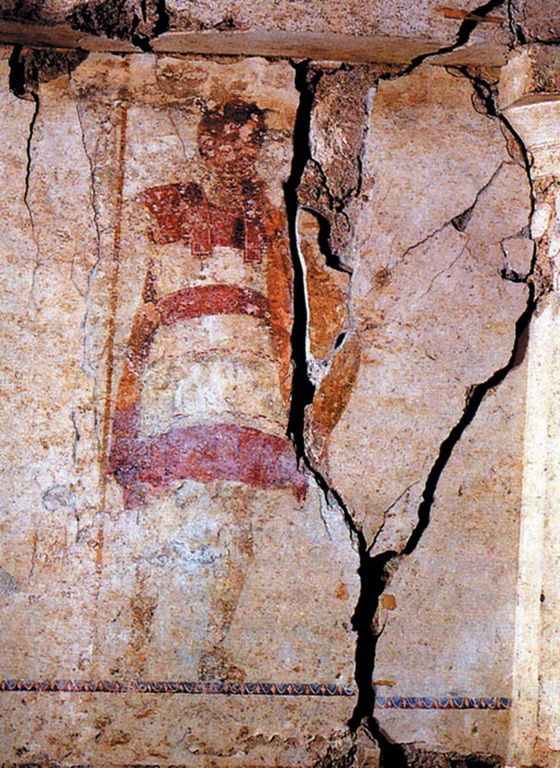
Painted depiction of a soldier wearing the linothorax, from the Tomb of Judgement in Mieza in Imathia, Greece, 4th/3rd century BC

Philip's first priorities were to reconstruct the Macedonian army, and restore the morale of both the army and the people. He held a series of assemblies with the Macedonian people, and "exhorting them with eloquent speeches to be men, he built up their morale". He exhaustively re-trained his men with new tactics and equipment. In particular, he instigated the use of the phalanx formation by the Macedonian foot-soldiery, and equipped the troops with 6-metre long pikes (the sarissa), in contrast to the 2–3-metre spear (doru) used by Greek hoplites.

=== Diplomacy ===
At the same time, Philip engaged in a flurry of diplomatic activity. He bribed Berisades, son of the Thracian king Cotys, to withdraw Thracian support for Pausanias, and thereby prevented the Thracian invasion. Similarly, he bought off the Paionians with gifts in exchange for their withdrawal from Macedon. Philip may also have concluded a treaty with the victorious Illyrian king Bardylis, possibly surrendering large parts of Macedon in exchange for peace. Although no evidence remains of such a treaty, the fact that Illyrians did not follow up their victory despite Macedon's weakness is suggestive that some agreement was reached. Philip also married Bardylis's daughter (or niece), which may have formed part of the treaty. At any rate, Philip's diplomacy gave Macedon some breathing space and time for recovery.

=== Battle of Methone ===
Philip realized that the sole intention of the Athenian support for Argeus was to recover Amphipolis (see below), which they hoped to do by placing Argeus on the throne. Philip therefore withdrew the Macedonian garrison from Amphipolis and declared it autonomous, to undermine the purpose of Athenian support for Argeus.

The Athenian expedition, led by Mantias, still landed at Methone on the Macedonian coast, with 3,000 mercenary troops. Mantias now declined to leave Methone, so Argeus instead led the troops to the ancient Macedonian capital of Aegae, hoping that the populace would declare him king. However, the people of Aegae showed no interest in doing so, and Argeus therefore marched back to Methone. On the way, he was attacked and defeated in battle by Philip, many of the Athenian mercenaries being slain and the rest taken captive. According to Diodorus, this victory did much to restore the morale of the Macedonian army, and gave the soldiers encouragement for the battles to come.

Having defeated the last immediate threat to Macedon, Philip returned to diplomacy. He released the Athenian prisoners immediately, and sent ambassadors to Athens. He was prepared to abandon all claim to Amphipolis, and this, coupled with his treatment of the Athenian prisoners, persuaded the Athenians to make peace with him.

=== Paionia and Illyria ===
The following year (358 BC), Philip heard that the Paionian king, Agis, had died. Taking advantage of their political disarray and transition of power, Philip marched his army into Paionia, where he defeated the Paionians. He then compelled the tribe to swear allegiance to Macedon.

Philip was now able to turn to the Illyrians, who were still occupying much of upper Macedon (whether agreed by treaty or not). Elimea and Eordaea had probably been the only principalities loyal to the Macedonian kingdom during the Illyrian invasion. On the other hand, Lynkestis was ruled by a competing dynasty related the Macedonian throne (and probably to Philip's mother, Eurydice) and other Upper Macedonia districts had links to foreign powers. Pelagonia was a traditional Athenian ally in Upper Macedonia whilst Lynkestis, Orestis and Tymphaea had links with the Molossian kingdom and Epirus. All of them enjoyed under the Illyrian and Paionian threat an opportunity to defy the central power and many were now under Bardylis hegemony.

Philip held an assembly of the army, gathered together a force of 10,000 men and 600 cavalry and marched into Illyria. Philip had also married Phila of Elimeia, ensuring an alliance with a principality of Upper Macedonia reputed by their cavalry. Bardylis, hearing of the preparations, sent ambassadors to Philip, proposing peace on the basis of the status quo. Philip rejected this, insisting that the Illyrians must withdraw completely from Macedonia, so Bardylis instead prepared for battle, raising 10,000 men and 500 cavalry, according to Diodorus.

Diodorus preserves the only account of the battle, which Beloch suggested may have taken place near Monastir. He says that:

When the armies approached each other and with a great outcry clashed in the battle, Philip, commanding the right wing, which consisted of the flower of the Macedonians serving under him, ordered his cavalry to ride past the ranks of the barbarians and attack them on the flank, while he himself falling on the enemy in a frontal assault began a bitter combat. But the Illyrians, forming themselves into a square, courageously entered the fray. And at first for a long while the battle was evenly poised because of the exceeding gallantry displayed on both sides, and as many were slain and still more wounded, the fortune of battle vacillated first one way then the other, being constantly swayed by the valorous deeds of the combatants; but later as the horsemen pressed on from the flank and rear and Philip with the flower of his troops fought with true heroism, the mass of the Illyrians was compelled to take hastily to flight.

— Diodorus Siculus

According to Diodorus, some 7,000 Illyrians died in the battle. The Illyrians withdrew from Macedon and sued for peace. After this campaign Philip had established his authority inland as far as Lake Ohrid. Not only were the Illyrians expelled, but also the king Menelaus of Pelagonia was exiled to Athens, leaving Philip as the sole overlord of the Upper Macedonia area. This allowed him to levy troops from a wider manpower pool during the rest of his reign. Some areas like Pelagonia were outright annexed whilst others like the loyal Elimea or the more distant valleys kept their autonomy as vassals. Philip reorganized the Macedonian administration into districts or ethne and established the companion system to keep the Macedonian nobility controlled. Under that scheme, the sons of the Macedonian nobility were included in the king's household rather than autonomous lords. Many of Philip's and Alexander's more famous generals in the years to come were from the Upper Macedonia nobility.

Philip also gained the favour of the Epirotes, his southwestern neighbors, who had also been at war with the Illyrians. The following year, Philip married the niece of the Molossian king of Epirus, Myrtale, which may have brought the frontier area between Macedon and Epirus, Orestis, under Philip's sphere of influence as part of her dowry.

To the northwest, Illyrians tribes like the Taulantii or the Dardanians had been expelled but not subjugated. To the north, the Strymon or the Nestus were the limits of Macedonia proper and the extent of control over Paionia was weaker. Sources and coins shows the Paionian had their own kings but most likely under some vassal or tributary status.

=== Thessaly ===
Justin and Diodorus both say that Philip also invaded Thessaly in 358 BC. In the years up to 370 BC, Thessaly had enjoyed a brief ascendancy in the Greek world, after being unified under Jason of Pherae, who was appointed Tagus (chief magistrate) of Thessaly. However, Jason was assassinated in 370 BC, and his son Alexander became Tagus. Alexander ruled harshly, and other states of the Thessalian League therefore withdrew their support for him, resulting in a desultory conflict in which both Macedon (under Alexander II) and eventually Thebes became embroiled. This conflict eventually ended in 364 BC when the Thebans were victorious over Alexander, and imposed a peace settlement on Thessaly. However, with the weakening of Thebes in the aftermath of Mantinea, on-off conflict within Thessaly continued. Alexander was himself assassinated in 358 BC, by his wife's brothers Tisiphonus, Lycophron and Peitholaus who became tyrants in his place. According to Diodorus, the Aleuadae, the noble family which dominated politics in the northern Thessalian city of Larissa, were opposed to these new tyrants, and requested aid from Philip.

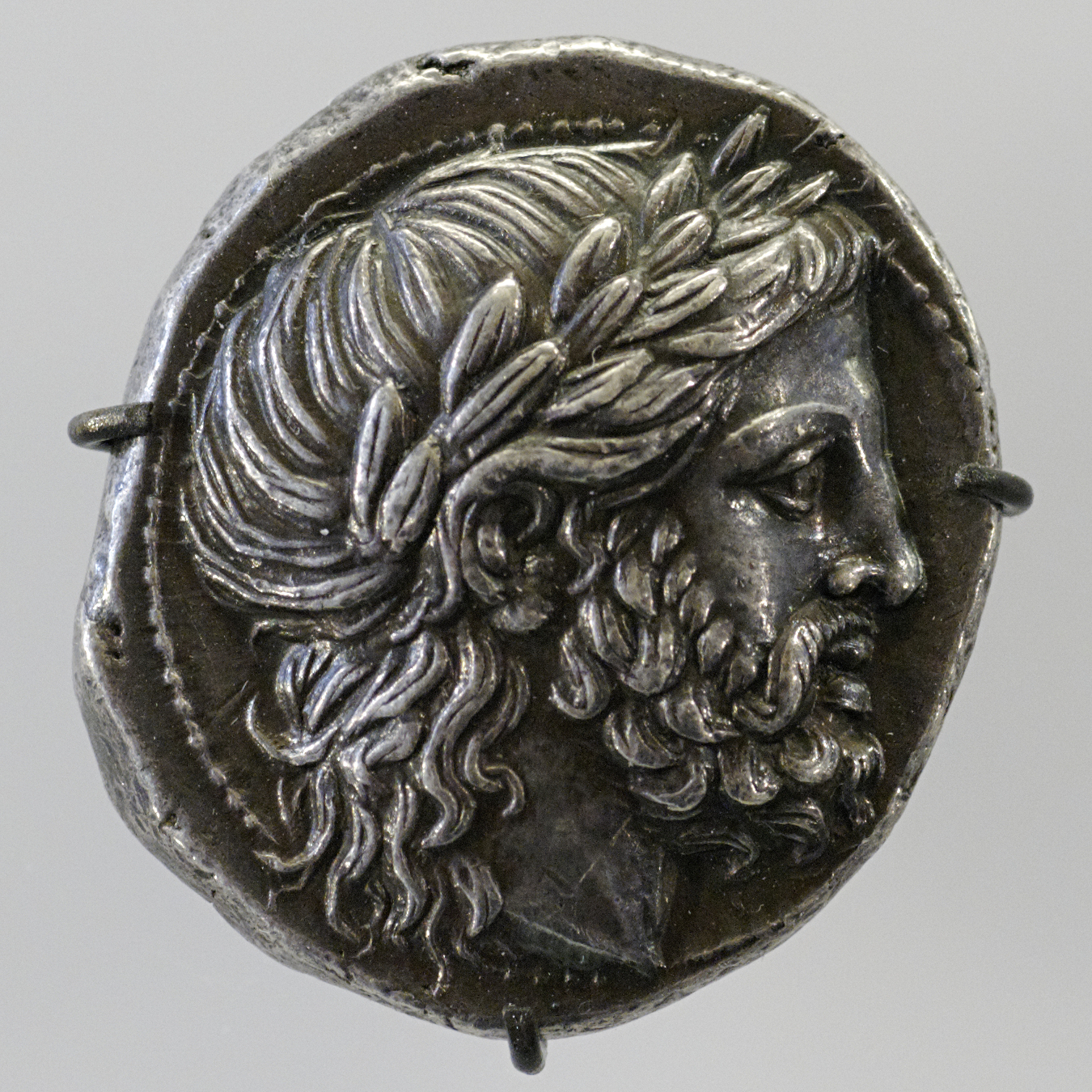
Philip II of Macedon – a Macedonian silver tetradrachm coin minted during his reign

Although Diodorus says that Philip defeated the new tyrants, Buckler considers it more likely that Philip's appearance on the scene allowed the Aleuadae to negotiate a peace settlement with Pherae from a position of greater strength. Philip seems to have come away from the expedition with new wives from both Larissa (Philinna) and Pherae (Nicesipolis, Jason's niece), which is suggestive of a negotiated settlement; certainly, as Buckler says, "Philip came away from Thessaly with a foot in both camps".

Philip appears to have had a strong interest in Thessaly from the start of his reign, even despite his problems elsewhere. There are several probable reasons for this interest. Firstly, and most pressingly, Philip probably wanted to take control of the border region of Perrhaebia (traditionally part of Thessaly), in order to secure Macedon's southern border. Secondly, since Larissa controlled the main north–south routes between Macedon and Thessaly, friendly relations with the Aleuadae would help protect Macedon and give Philip access to the rest of Greece. Thirdly, Thessaly had plentiful resources that Philip could see the long-term potential of exploiting:

Thessaly was rich in land, produce, cities and men. Thessalian cavalry was the best in Greece, and the mountainous country surrounding Thessaly supplied numerous peltasts. Success in Thessaly would provide Philip with a new army and additional revenues. Nor could he wisely stand by and watch the tyrants of Pherae overwhelm the Thessalian confederacy. Jason of Pherae had given the Greek world a glimpse of the potential might of a united Thessaly, and no Macedonian king could afford to forget the lesson.

— John Buckler

=== Summary to 358 BC ===
Philip successfully shored up the Macedonian situation, defeating or making peace with Macedon's erstwhile enemies, whilst securing most of Macedon's borders, and revitalising and retraining his army.HAD

== Conquest in the North (357–353 BC) ==
=== Amphipolis (357 BC) ===
Philip's next aim was to secure Macedon's eastern flank, which bordered Thrace, and in particular the city of Amphipolis. Amphipolis was a major strategic point, situated on the Strymon River, where it controlled the only crossing point on the lower reaches of the river, and therefore access to and from Thrace. Eastwards expansion of his kingdom therefore required that Philip control Amphipolis. The Athenians had founded a colony there in the previous century, only to lose control of it during the Peloponnesian War. The Athenians were very keen to recover Amphipolis, partly because of its history, although the Amphipolitans were not inclined to return to Athenian control. However, the main reasons were because of the location of Amphipolis close to forests needed for shipbuilding, and because it controlled the gold and silver mines of Mount Pangaion. The importance of Amphipolis to the Athenians during this period cannot be overstated; "their longing for it was constant and extreme".

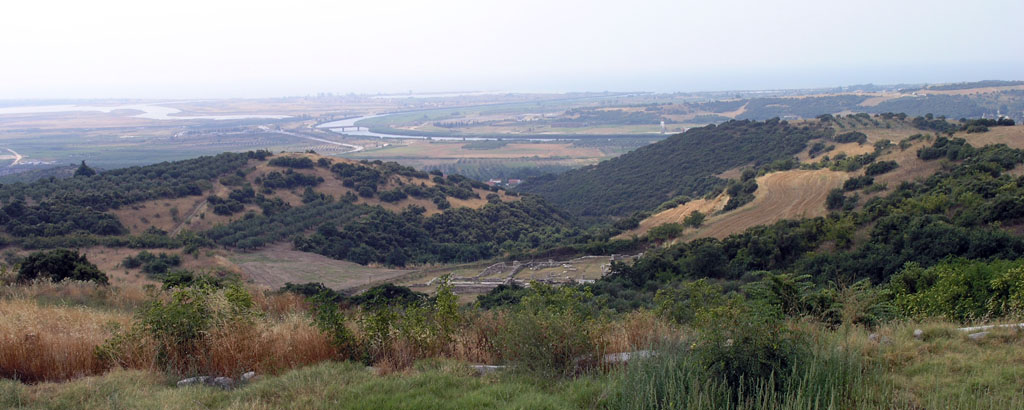
View of the Strymon River from the acropolis of Amphipolis

Philip began besieging Amphipolis in 357 BC; the Amphipolitans, abandoning their anti-Athenian policy, promptly appealed to Athens, offering to return to its control. However, during the siege, Philip sent a letter to Athens saying that he would hand over the city once he captured it (thus appearing to follow the same policy as he had in 359 BC). The Athenians, thus lulled, waited to see whether he would. The Athenians may also have been unable to send help to Amphipolis. During the summer months, strong northerly winds blew into the Aegean Sea, making it difficult for the Athenians to send ships north. Philip was to make repeated use of the Etesian winds, campaigning during those months (or in winter), when the Athenian navy would be unable to send assistance to his enemies.

The Athenians seem to have offered Philip Pydna in exchange for Amphipolis, perhaps during the later stages of the siege, but it is not clear whether Philip agreed to this. By this stage, the Social War of 357–355 BC had broken out between Athens and their erstwhile allies, and they would now have been unable to intervene to help Amphipolis. Philip eventually succeeded in breaching the walls of Amphipolis, through the use of siege engines and battering rams; his forces then stormed and captured the city. Philip expelled those who were hostile to him but, according to Diodorus, treated the rest of the population considerately.

=== Pydna and Potidea (357–356 BC) ===
During the siege of Amphipolis, the Chalkidian League, led by Olynthos, began to fear Philip's territorial ambitions (since Amphipolis also controlled access to Chalkidiki), and therefore sought to ally with Athens against him. However, the Athenians still hoped to receive Amphipolis from Philip and so refused. Philip himself feared an alliance of the powerful Chalkidian League and Athens, so he moved to reassure the Olynthians by offering them an alliance on very advantageous terms. As part of the agreement with Olynthos, Philip was to capture the city of Potidea, located in the territory of the Chalkidian League. Potidea was at that time under the control of Athens, and represented a threat to the stability of the league.

Philip had no intention of handing over Amphipolis to the Athenians, but acted as if he was just delaying the transfer of the city. He seems to have gone straight on to besiege Pydna after capturing Amphipolis. The Athenians, perhaps still hoping to receive Amphipolis if they allowed Philip to take Pydna, do not seem to have tried to intervene (and may not have been able to). Pydna seems to have fallen to Philip by treachery, in either 357 or 356 BC.

In 356 BC, Philip then besieged and captured Potidea, thus marking the beginning of true hostilities with Athens. As promised, he handed Potidea over to the Olynthians, and let the Athenian garrison depart freely back to Athens, since he did not want to cause undue offence to the Athenians ("he was particularly solicitous toward the people of Athens on account of the importance and repute of their city"). The Athenians were by this time fully engaged in fighting the Social War, and were unable to respond effectively to Philip's moves against Potidea and Pydna.

=== Alliance against Philip (356–352 BC) ===
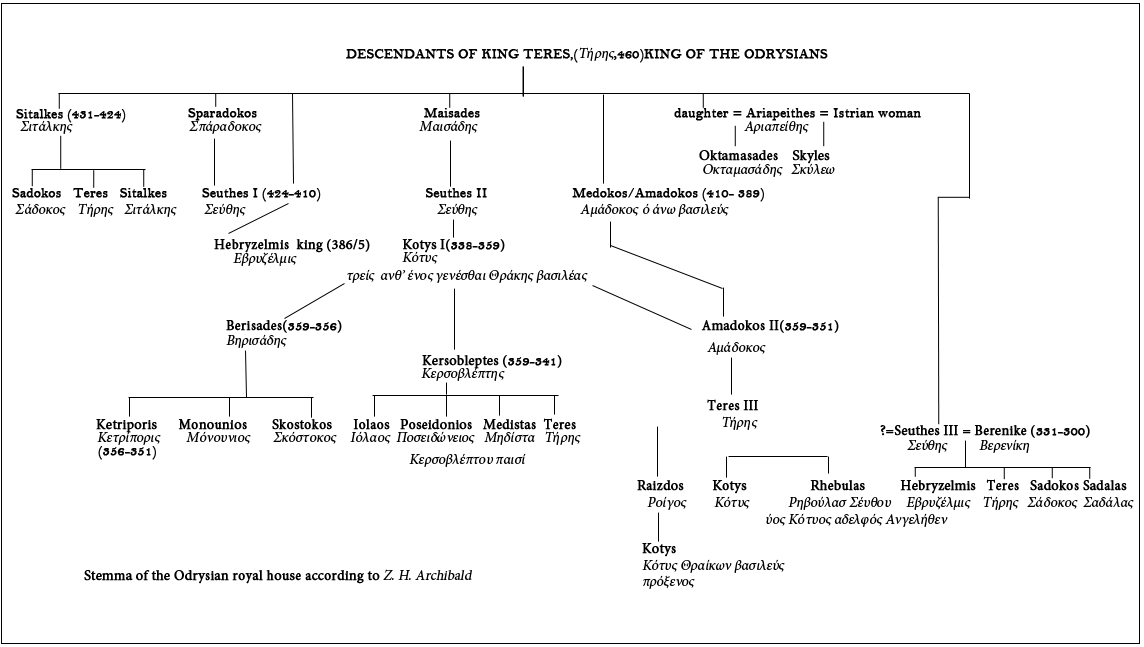
Genealogical tree of the Odrysian kings of Thrace

In 356 BC, in response to King Philip's machinations, the Athenians allied with the kings of Illyria, Paionia and Thrace, to try to block his advance. Thrace was by now ruled by three kings, descendants of Cotys; in the west was Ketriporis, the son of Berisades (Cotys's second son); in the centre, Amadokos II (Cotys's third son), and in the east Kersebleptes (Cotys's first son). Whether Athens allied to all three Thracian kings is a matter of conjecture; certainly at least Ketriporis joined the alliance. If Kersebleptes did ally with Athens, he appears to have relatively quickly cast off this allegiance, in favour of extending his realm at the expense of Amadokos and Ketriporis. In Illyria, Bardylis' defeat meant a shift in the hegemony among tribes, with the Grabaei led by Grabos II becoming the main power after the defeat of the Illyrians of Bardylis.

According to Diodorus, Philip marched on his enemies in this alliance before they had chance to combine, and forced them to ally to Macedon instead. However, other sources suggest that the picture was actually much more complex, and that Philip in turn defeated each of the powers over the next few years, with the exception of Athens.

According to Plutarch, an army under Parmenion defeated the Illyrian king Grabos II in 356 BC, shortly after the conclusion of the siege of Potidea. Grabos then became a subject ally of Macedon. The following year, Philip seems to have defeated Ketriporis, and reduced him to the status of a subject ally, although information for this campaign is very limited. He is also presumed to have defeated the Paionians at some point during this period, although there is no explicit record of this. There is no evidence that any of these allies received any substantial aid from Athens, which was still too preoccupied with the Social War.

The victory consolidated Philip's control of Upper Macedon. The small, autonomous principalities like Elimiotis and Lynkestis seems to have been integrated the following year, with the former kings being stripped of their titles and reduced to part of Phillip's court. Philip also founded Heraclea Lyncestis as a new urban center in the area.

Philip II surrounded Macedon with vassals or subjects allies to replace the coalition he defeated. North of Macedon, the Paionians of the king Lycceius were vassals. The Thracian tribe of the agrianes, neighbors of Paioia, and their king, Langarus, also appear from 352 as allies of Philip and were and from that moment on a relevant support of the Macedonian army. To the northeast, the Thracian kingdom of Ketriporis was also a vassal. To the northwest, the defeated Grabaei were now a buffer state between Macedon and tribes non-subject to Philip, like the Taulantii.

The victory against Grabos took place at the same time of the birth of Philip’s heir, Alexander, son of Myrtale (who changed her name to Olympias), which may also cemented the alliance with Epirus in the southwest. In the following years Olympias' brother, also named Alexander, took refuge in Philip's court and the Macedonian influence increased from 351. Some scholars date from 350 the Macedonian direct control of Tymphaea, another border area between Epirus and Macedon.

=== Krinides (356 BC) ===
In 356 BC, whilst Parmenion campaigned against the Illyrians, Philip campaigned in Thrace, and captured the town of Krinides, which had been founded by Thasos in 360 BC. He changed the name to Philippi, after himself, and greatly increased the population. He also greatly improved the gold mines in the surrounding area, the effects of which are described by Diodorus:

Turning to the gold mines in its territory, which were very scanty and insignificant, he increased their output so much by his improvements that they could bring him a revenue of more than a thousand talents. And because from these mines he had soon amassed a fortune, with the abundance of money he raised the Macedonian kingdom higher and higher to a greatly superior position, for with the gold coins which he struck, which came to be known from his name as Philippeioi, he organized a large force of mercenaries, and by using these coins for bribes induced many Greeks to become betrayers of their native lands.

— Diodorus Siculus

The capture of Krinides was thus, in the long term, a very significant event in Philip's rise to power. Among its effects, it is noteworthy that Philip pioneered the use of archers (both mercenary Cretan archers and locally trained Macedonians) and siege engineers in the Macedonia army. Those army corps were expensive but critical for the takeover of fortified cities. Before 350 BC, Philip was already in use of them, changing the preexisting balance of power.

=== Maroneia and Abdera (c. 355 BC) ===
Polyaenus recounts that Philip attacked and sacked the cities of Abdera and Maroneia along the coast of Thrace. This occurred during a single campaign, but does not say when. Diodorus does not mention this campaign, making its position within the overall chronology difficult to place.

Buckler suggests the following: According to the Athenian politician Demosthenes, Kersebleptes met Philip at Maroneia (in Thrace), together with the Theban general Pammenes, and came to an agreement with Philip; furthermore, he states that Amadokos was hostile to Philip at the time. Demosthenes says that the Athenian general Chares filed the report about the meeting between Philip, Pammenes and Kersebleptes; and Polyaenus says that after Philip's Maroneia campaign, Chares ambushed Philip's fleet off the coast of Neapolis. Since it is recorded that Neapolis appealed to Athens for aid against Philip in 355 BC, it is a strong possibility that these events all took place in 355 BC. It is not entirely clear what occasioned this meeting between Philip and Kersebleptes; Buckler suggests that Philip and Kersebleptes agreed to divide Thrace between them, leaving Kersebleptes free to attack the other Thracian kings (to try to reunite the Thracian kingdom), and leaving Philip free to campaign elsewhere.

Conversely, Cawkwell and Sealey suggest the Maroneia campaign was in 353 BC (though without explicit justification). The Maroneia campaign might therefore have been part of the campaign that Philip fought against Cetriporis (probably 355 BC), or a campaign against Amadokos (probably 353 BC).

=== Siege of Methone (c. 354 BC) ===
The chronology for activities in Greece during the years 355–352 BC is not entirely clear (see below). Philip certainly started besieging Methone, the last Athenian possession in Macedon, during this period, but different historians choose different dates for this siege. There are two main theories, either 355–354 BC, as favoured by, for instance, Buckler, or 354–353 BC, as favoured by Cawkwell.

Philip began the siege, but was frustrated in his attempt to take it, and the siege dragged on for nearly a year. During this time, there were two failed Athenian attempts to relieve the city. Philip was to lose an eye during the siege when he was hit by an arrow. Despite the injury inflicted on him by the defenders, he eventually agreed terms with the citizens of Methone, allowing them all to depart with one garment each. Buckler suggests that this lenient settlement may have been the result of the Thessalian request to intervene in the Third Sacred War (see below); anxious not to miss this opportunity, Philip sought to end the siege as quickly as possible.

=== Summary to c. 354 BC ===
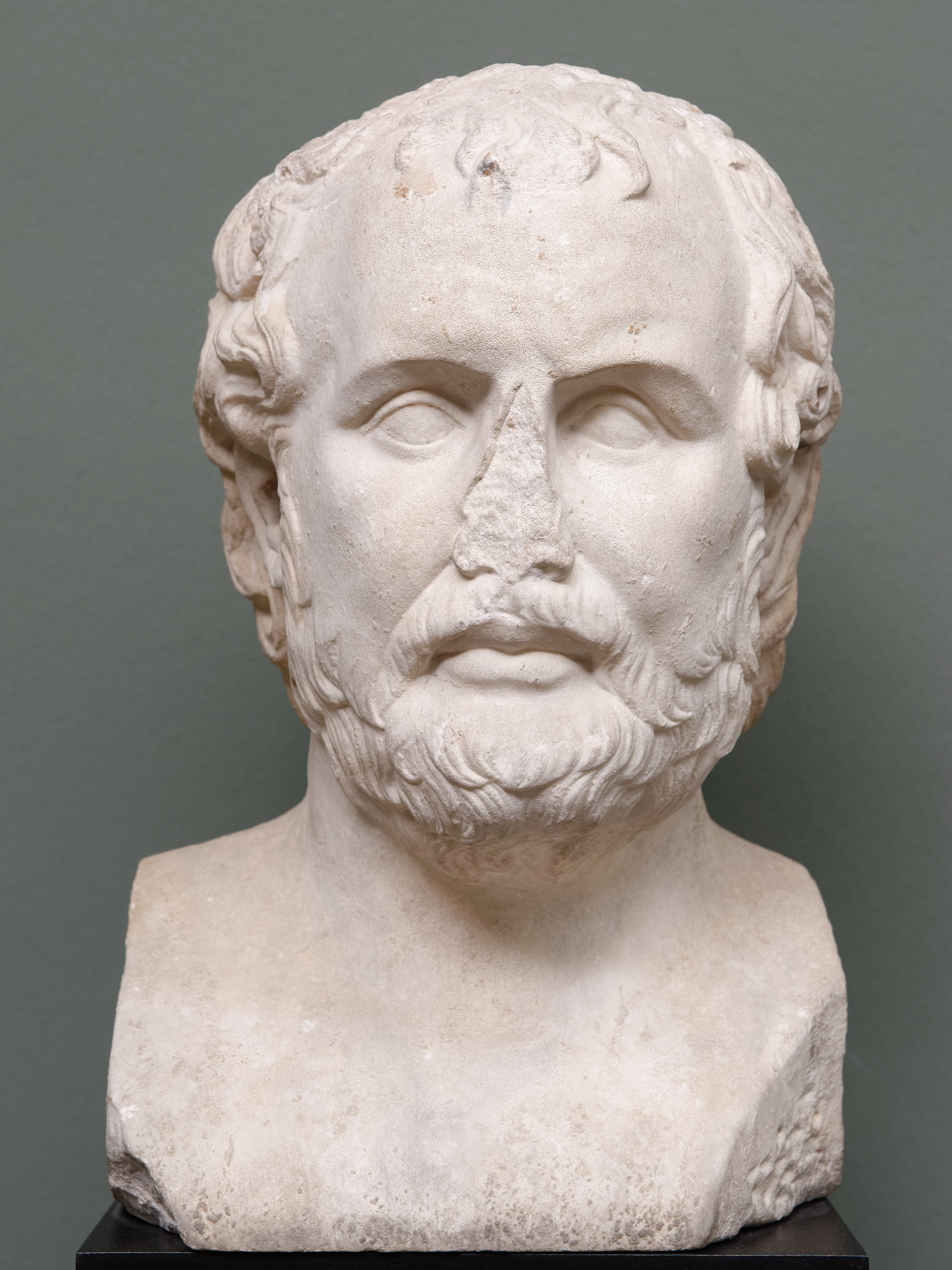
Sculpted portrait of Philip II of Macedon, a Roman era copy of a Hellenistic Greek original from the 4th-3rd century BC, Ny Carlsberg Glyptotek

By 354/353 BC, in just 5 years since his accession, Philip had unified Macedon and turned it into the dominant power in Northern Greece. He had completely reduced Athenian influence in the region, and was allied to the other major Greek power in the region, the Chalkidian League. He had, in the process, secured access to the Aegean sea, which had been an age-old problem in Macedon, since suitable sites had been monopolised by Greek colonists in the Archaic period. Furthermore, he had overhauled and re-trained the army, which was now battle-hardened, and he now had a supply of ready money to pay for more troops.

This rapid rise in the power of Macedon was in part due to Philip's exceptional military and diplomatic skills. However, it was also in part due to the weakened state of the major powers of Greece. Sparta had never recovered from Epaminondas's liberation of Messenia, whilst in turn Thebes was still weakened by Epaminondas's death and the aftermath of Mantinea. Athens, as discussed above, was embroiled in a war with its allies; in 355 BC, the Athenians agreed a peace that left many of its former allies independent, severely weakening Athenian power. Although these powers protested against Philip's actions, they had too many other problems to attempt any intervention; Philip thus went largely unchallenged until 354 BC.

== Thessaly and the Sacred War (356–352 BC) ==
=== Background ===
The Third Sacred War (often just called 'the' Sacred War) broke out in 356 BC, and would present Philip with his first real opportunity to expand his influence into the affairs of central and southern Greece. The war was ostensibly caused by the refusal of the Phocian Confederation to pay a fine imposed on them in 357 BC by the Amphictyonic League, a pan-Greek religious organisation which governed the most sacred site in Ancient Greece, the Temple of Apollo at Delphi. Behind the religious element, there probably lay a display of realpolitik in bringing charges against the Phocians, instigated by the Thebans. At this time, Thebes controlled a majority of the votes in the council, and at the autumn meeting in 357 BC, the Thebans were able to have both the Phocians (for the cultivation of the sacred land) and the Spartans (for occupying Thebes some 25 years previously) denounced and fined. Since the fines for both parties were "unjustifiably harsh", the Thebans probably expected neither party to pay, and thus to be able to declare a "sacred war" on either.

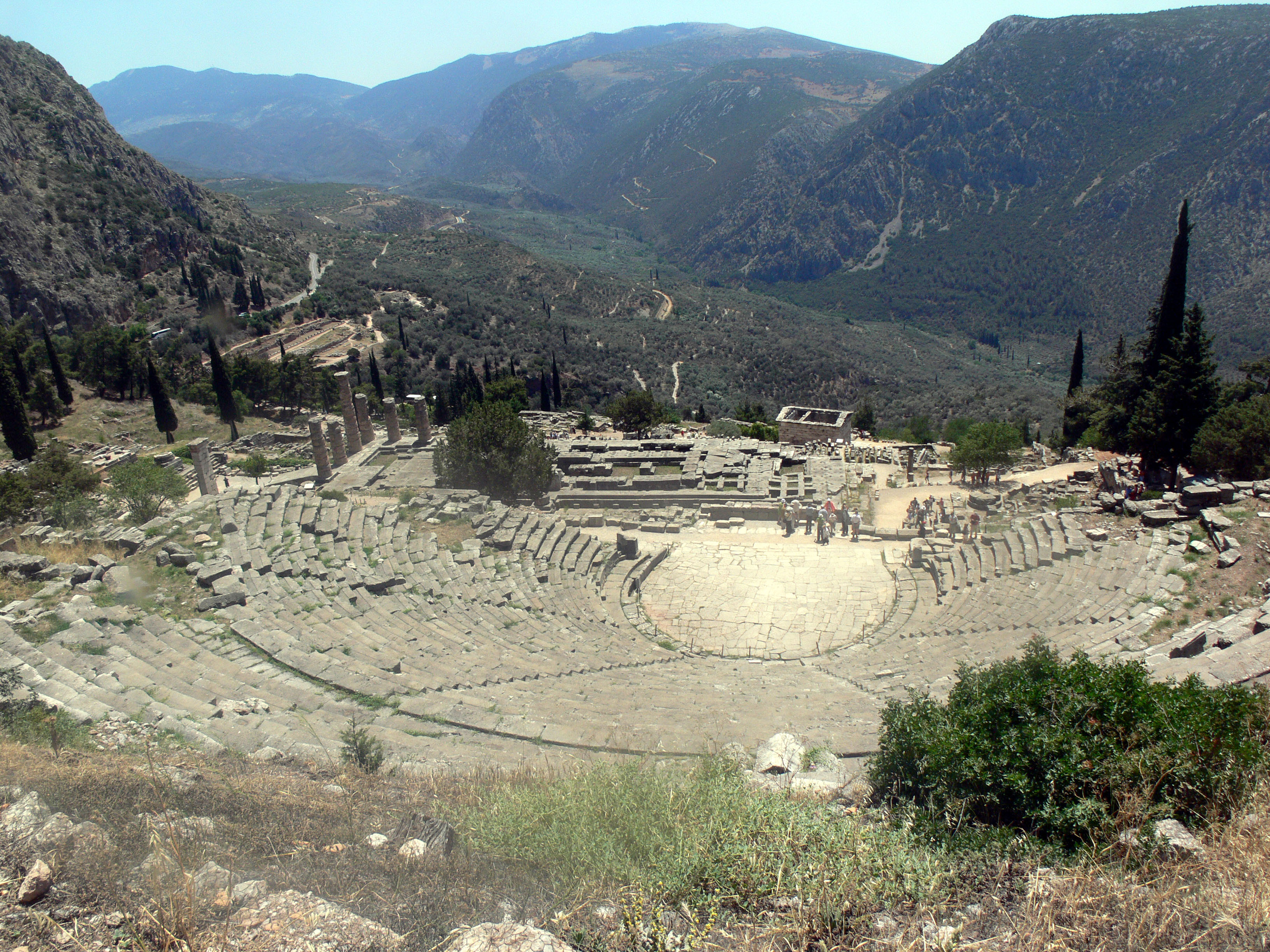
The ruins of ancient Delphi

In response, the Phocians, under the leadership of Philomelos, seized Delphi (which was situated within the boundaries of Phocis), and asserted the ancient claim of Phocis to the presidency of the Amphictyonic League, intending to annul the judgment against themselves. There seems to have been some sympathy in Greece for the Phocians, since other states could see that "the Thebans ... had used the Amphictyony to pursue petty and destructive vendettas". The Phocians were supported by Athens (perennial enemies of Thebes) and unsurprisingly Sparta, who hoped to see their own fine wiped out when the Phocians seized Delphi. However, Philomelos plundered the treasury of Apollo to pay for mercenaries, thus raising a powerful army, but drastically altering the opinion of the other Greek states. In winter 356/355 BC, a "sacred war" was declared against the Phocians by the Amphictyonic council, with the Thebans being the major protagonists. The war started relatively well for the Phocians, but a severe defeat was inflicted on the Phocians at Neon by the Thebans in either 355 or 354 BC, and Philomelos was killed. Undeterred, Onomarchus took over the Phocian effort, and raised new mercenaries to carry on the fight.

=== Chronology of the Sacred War ===
The ancient sources for the Sacred War are scant, and generally lacking in firm chronological information. Modern historians' dates for the war have therefore been hotly debated, with no clear consensus. It is generally accepted that the war lasted 10 years, and ended in summer 346 BC (one of the only firm dates), which yields a date of 356 BC for the beginning of the war, with Philomelos's seizure of Delphi. After Philomelos's defeat at Neon, the Thebans thought it safe to send the general Pammenes to Asia with 5000 hoplites; as has been discussed, Pammenes probably met with Philip at Maroneia in 355 BC, presumably on his outward journey. Buckler, the only historian to produce a systematic study of the sacred war, therefore places Neon in 355 BC, and suggests after the meeting with Pammenes, Philip went to begin the siege of Methone. Other historians have placed Neon in 354 BC, because Diodorus says that the battle took place while Philip besieged Methone which Diodorus (at one point) places in 354 BC. However, Diodorus's chronology for the sacred war is very confused—he dates the start and end of the war a year too late, variously says the war lasted 9, 10 or 11 years, and included the siege of Methone twice under different dates—and his dates cannot therefore be relied upon.

Disregarding the dates, most historians agree upon the same sequence of events for this part of the Sacred War. The principal question is therefore when that sequence started. Thus, Buckler (as well as Beloch and Cloche) dates Neon to 355 BC, Methone to 355–354 BC, Philip's first Thessalian campaign to 354 BC, and his second to 353 BC. Conversely, Cawkwell, Sealey, Hammond and others give these dates as occurring one year later, beginning with Neon in 354 BC.

=== First campaign in Thessaly ===
The Sacred War appears to have laid way for renewed conflict within Thessaly. The Thessalian Confederation were in general staunch supporters of the Amphictyonic League, and had an ancient hatred of the Phocians. Conversely, Pherae had allied itself with the Phocians. In either 354 or 353 BC, the Aleuadae appealed to Philip to help them defeat Pherae. Philip responded positively, perhaps unsurprisingly:

... the struggle between Pherae and its neighbours offered Philip rich possibilities. The chronic political instability of the area and the support of the Thessalian confederation guaranteed that he would face no united opposition to his ambitions. The Thessalians were giving Philip the same opportunity to become ascendant there that they had given Pelopidas and the Thebans in 369 BC.

— John Buckler

Philip thus brought an army into Thessaly, probably with the intention of attacking Pherae. Under the terms of their alliance, Lycophron of Pherae requested aid from the Phocians, and Onomarchus dispatched his brother, Phayllos with 7000 men; however, Philip repulsed this force before it could join up with the Pheraeans. Onomarchus then abandoned the siege he was currently prosecuting, and brought his whole force into Thessaly to attack Philip. It is possible that Onomarchus hoped to conquer Thessaly in the process, which would both leave the Thebans isolated (Locris and Doris having already fallen to the Phocians), and give the Phocians a majority in the Amphictyonic council, thus enabling them to have the war declared over. Onomarchus probably brought with him 20,000 infantry, 500 cavalry, and a large number of catapults, and outnumbered Philip's army. The exact details of the campaign that followed are unclear, but Onomarchus seems to have inflicted two defeats on Philip, with many Macedonians killed in the process. Polyaenus suggests that the first of Onomarchus' victories was aided by the use of the catapults to throw stones into the Macedonian phalanx, as they climbed a slope to attack the Phocians. After these defeats, Philip retreated to Macedon for the winter. He is said to have commented that he "did not run away but, like a ram, I pulled back to butt again harder".

=== Second campaign in Thessaly ===
Philip returned to Thessaly the next summer (either 353 or 352 BC, depending on the chronology followed), having gathered a new army in Macedon. Philip formally requested that the Thessalians join him in the war against the Phocians; the Thessalians, even if underwhelmed by Philip's performance the previous year, realistically had little choice if they wanted to avoid being conquered by Onomarchus' army. Philip now mustered all the Thessalian opponents of Pherae that he could, and according to Diodorus, his final army numbered 20,000 infantry and 3000 cavalry.

==== Pagasae ====
At some point during his campaigns in Thessaly, Philip captured the strategic port of Pagasae, which was in effect the port of Pherae. It is unclear whether this was during the first or second campaign; both Buckler and Cawkwell suggest that it took place in the second campaign, before the Battle of Crocus Field. By taking Pagasae, it is possible that Philip prevented Pherae from being reinforced by sea during his second campaign. Buckler suggests that Philip had learnt his lesson from the previous campaign, and intended to cut Pherae off from outside help before attacking it.

==== Battle of Crocus Field ====
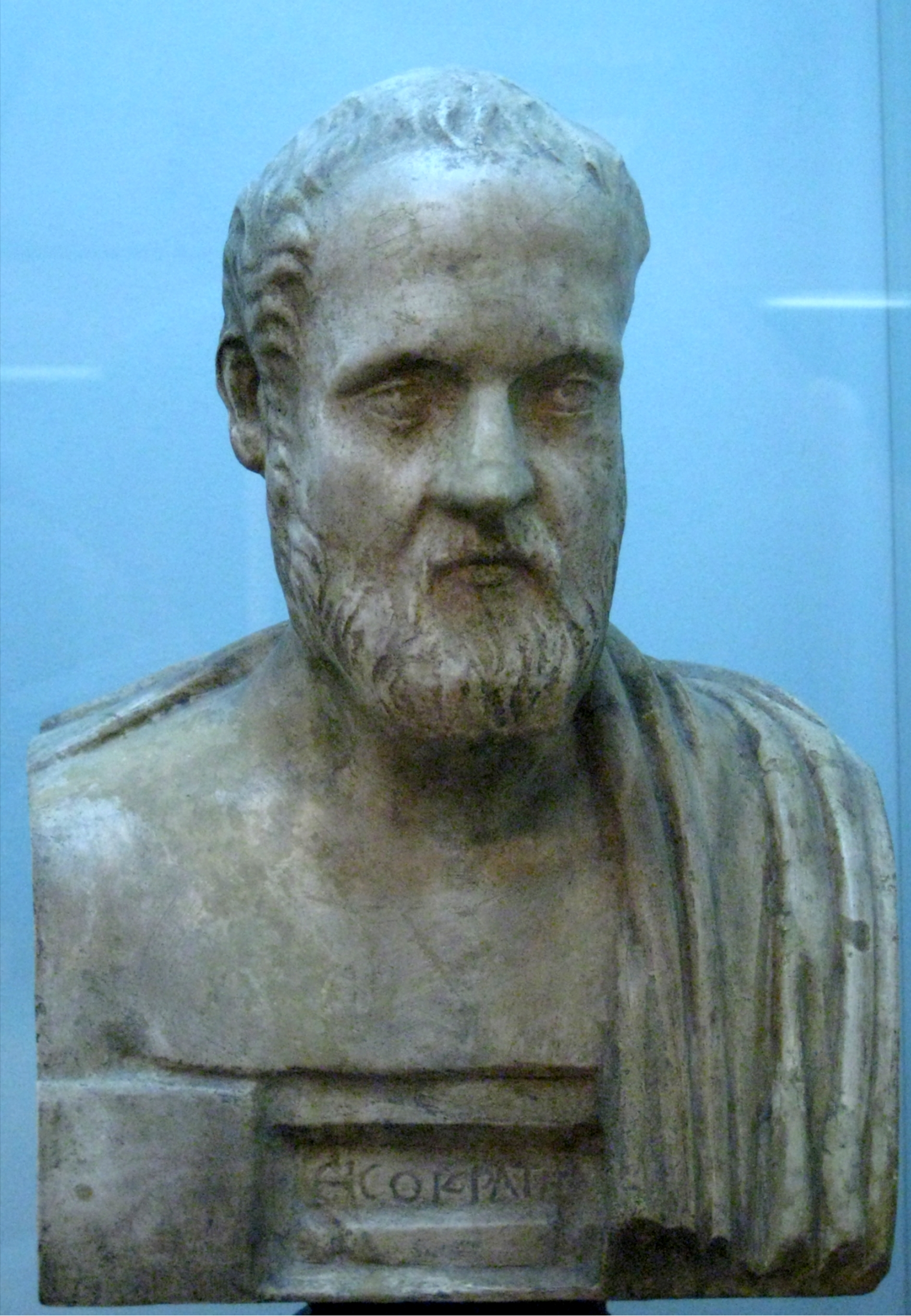
Bust of Isocrates; plaster cast in the Pushkin Museum of the bust formerly at Villa Albani, Rome

Meanwhile, Onomarchus returned to Thessaly to try to preserve the Phocian ascendancy there, with approximately the same force as during the previous year. Furthermore, the Athenians dispatched Chares to help their Phocian allies, seeing the opportunity to strike a decisive blow against Philip. Subsequent events are unclear, but a battle was fought between the Macedonians and the Phocians, probably as Philip tried to prevent the Phocians uniting forces with the Pheraeans, and crucially, before the Athenians had arrived. According to Diodorus, the two armies met on a large plain near the sea (the 'crocus field'), probably in the vicinity of Pagasae. Philip sent his men into battle wearing crown of laurel, the symbol of the Apollo; "as if he was the avenger ... of sacrilege, and he proceeded to battle under the leadership, as it were, of the god". Some of the Phocian mercenaries supposedly threw down their arms, panged by their guilty consciences. In the ensuing battle, the bloodiest recorded in ancient Greek history, Philip won a decisive victory against the Phocians. In total, 6000 Phocian troops had been killed including Onormarchus, and another 3000 taken prisoner. Onomarchus was either hanged or crucified and the other prisoners drowned, as was the ritual punishment demanded for temple-robbers. These punishments were designed to deny the defeated an honourable burial; Philip thus continued to present himself as the pious avenger of the sacrilege committed by the Phocians. Buckler states that: "Nor should one automatically assume that a mass-drowning ... would shock the Greek world. Even the mild-tempered Isocrates felt that the Phocian mercenaries were better off dead than alive ... Dreadful indeed was the punishment, but it was entirely consistent with Philip's role as Apollo's champion".

==== Re-organisation of Thessaly ====
It was probably in the aftermath of his victory (if not before) that the Thessalians appointed Philip archon of Thessaly. This was an appointment for life, and gave Philip control over all the revenues of the Thessalian Confederation, and furthermore made Philip leader of the united Thessalian army.

Philip was now able to settle Thessaly at his leisure. He probably first finished the siege of Pagasae, to deny the Athenians a landing place in Thessaly. Pagasae was not part of the Thessalian Confederation, and Philip therefore took it as his own, and garrisoned it. The fall of Pagasae now left Pherae totally isolated. Lycophron, rather than suffer the fate of Onomarchos, struck a bargain with Philip, and in return for handing Pherae over to Philip, he was allowed, along with 2000 of his mercenaries, to go to Phocis. Philip now worked to unite the traditionally fractious cities of Thessaly under his rule. He took direct control of several cities in western Thessaly, exiling the dissidents, and in one case refounding the city with a Macedonian population; he tightened his control of Perrhaebia, and invaded Magnesia, also taking it as his own and garrisoning it; "when finished, he was lord of Thessaly."

==== Thermopylae ====
Once satisfied with his reorganisation of Thessaly, Philip marched south to the pass of Thermopylae, the gateway to central Greece. He probably intended to follow up his victory over the Phocians by invading Phocis itself, a prospect which greatly alarmed the Athenians, since once he had passed Thermopylae, he could also march on Athens. The Athenians therefore dispatched a force to Thermopylae and occupied the pass; there is some debate as to whether other contingents may have joined the Athenians at Thermopylae. The Athenians were certainly there, since the Athenian orator Demosthenes celebrated the defence of the pass in one of his speeches. Cawkwell suggests that the Athenian force was the one that Diodorus says was dispatched under Nausicles consisting of 5000 infantry and 400 cavalry, and that they were joined by the remnants of the Phocians and the Pheraean mercenaries. However, Buckler argues that Diodorus never mentions Thermopylae, and the force under Nausicles was sent to help the Phocians the following year; instead, he believes that another Athenian force held the pass unassisted. Although it might have proved possible to force the pass, Philip did not attempt to do so, preferring not to risk a defeat after his great successes in Thessaly.

=== Summary to 352 BC ===
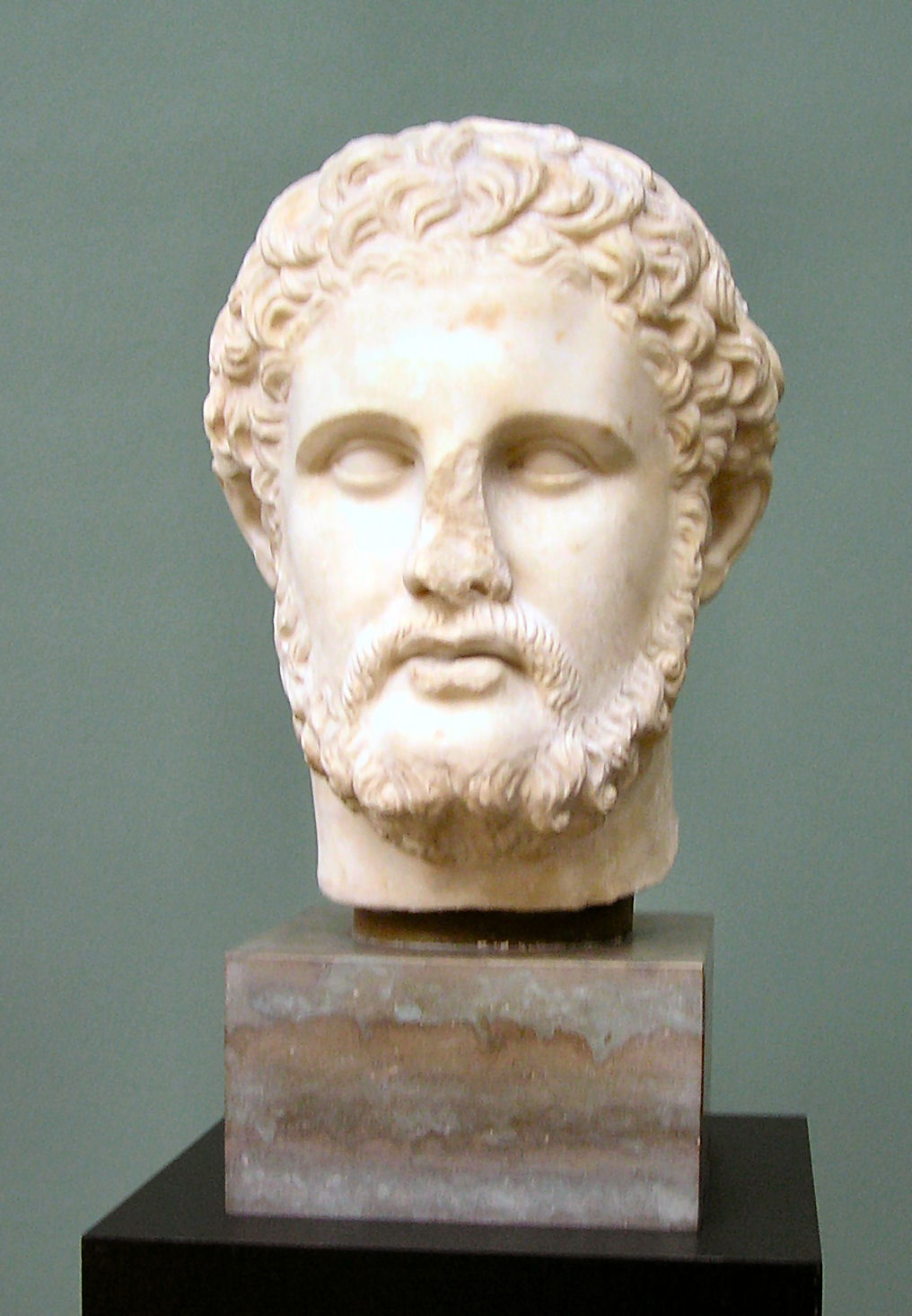
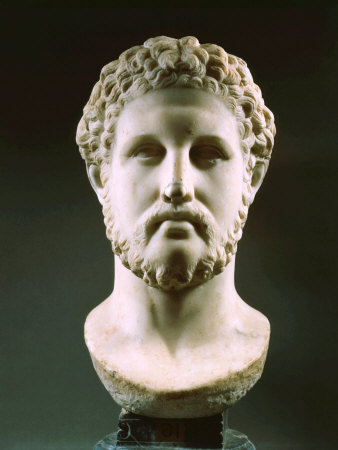
Left: a bust of Philip II of Macedon (r. 359–336 BC) from the Hellenistic period, located at Ny Carlsberg Glyptotek
Right: another bust of Philip II, a 1st-century AD Roman copy of a Hellenistic Greek original, now in the Vatican Museums

Cawkwell describes 352 BC as Philip's annus mirabilis. His appointment to high command in Thessaly was a dramatic increase in his power, effectively giving him a whole new army. His actions as the "avenger" and "saviour" of Apollo were calculated to win him goodwill amongst the Greeks in general. As a result of Philip's increased power and influence, Worthington suggests that by the time of Demosthenes' "First Philippic" (351 BC), Philip was already unstoppable in his aim to control Greece.

==== Strategic situation ====
The stalemate at Thermopylae pointed the future direction of the ongoing conflict between Philip and the Athenians. Athens was a significant naval power, whilst Macedon had no real navy to speak of. Conversely, Macedon had a very powerful army, especially with the addition of the Thessalians after 352 BC, which Athens could not hope to match. The Athenians could therefore prevent Philip attacking Athens by sea, but not by land—unless they could occupy Thermopylae in time. The pass was narrow enough to make troop numbers irrelevant, and could only be bypassed with some difficulty, meaning the Athenians could hope to resist Philip there; Thermopylae therefore became the key position in the conflict. The Athenians also began to realise that they could not hope to reclaim Amphipolis, or defeat Philip, and must instead act on the defensive; as Demosthenes said: "the war at the outset was concerned with taking revenge on Philip, now at its conclusion with not suffering at Philip's hands". From Philip's point of view, once he controlled Amphipolis, he could operate in the North Aegean unimpeded, especially if he campaigned during the Etesian winds, or in winter, when the Athenian navy could do little to stop him. However, he could not easily advance into Greece, to attack Athens for instance, if Thermopylae was held against him.

== Thrace (353–352 BC) ==
Most historians agree that Philip campaigned in Thrace in 353 BC, but what exactly he achieved is a matter of some confusion. As has been discussed, some, including Cawkwell and Sealey, place the Maroneia and Abdera campaign in 353 BC. Others suggest that, in a campaign whose details are essentially unknown, Philip defeated the central Thracian king, Amadokos, reducing him to the status of subject ally. Since the Maroneia and Abdera campaign took place in Amadokos's territory, it seems likely that, under either chronology, Philip campaigned against Amadokos in 353 BC.

In the early part of 352 BC several key events had occurred in, or around Thrace which challenged Philip's influence in the region. The Athenian general Chares captured Sestos, on the Thracian Chersonese early in the year, probably taking the city from Kersebleptes. The Athenians had a long-standing interest in the Chersonese for strategic reasons, and it had formed a significant part of their 'Empire' in the 5th century BC. Firstly, Athens depended largely on the import of grain from the Crimea for her food supply; controlling the Chersonese helped to ensure that supplies could safely pass through the Hellespont. Secondly, the Chersonese was used as a place to settle the excess citizenry of Athens, usually in the form of cleruchies, colonies which were not politically independent of the mother city. After the capture of Sestos, Kersebleptes, who up until now had resisted Athenian attempts to reclaim the Chersonese, now came to terms with Athens. He was probably now worried about Philip's influence in the region, and thus sought to ally with the Athenians, giving them control of all the cities of the Chersonese except Cardia. Furthermore, the Chalkidian League also seems to have turned against Philip in 352 BC, presumably also concerned by his designs on their territory, and sought peace with Athens.

Philip probably also campaigned in Thrace in late 352 BC, possibly after returning to Macedon from Thessaly. At this point, if not before, Philip defeated Amadokos and subjugated him, and possibly also expelled Cetriporis from his client kingship. During the campaign, Philip's army reached deep into Kersebleptes' territory and laid siege to the fortress of Heraion Teichos located somewhere near Perinthos, on the coast of the Propontis (although Buckler places this siege in 353 BC). On learning of the siege, the Athenians voted to dispatch 40 triremes to oppose Philip. However, they then heard that Philip had died (or had been taken ill), so the relief mission never actually sailed. It seems clear that Philip did fall ill during the campaign, but exactly how the campaign ended is unclear. It was probably at this time that Philip took Kersebleptes' son as a hostage to Pella, effectively ending Kersebleptes' freedom of action.

== Olynthian War (349–348 BC) ==
As discussed, the Chalkidian League had made peace with Athens in 352 BC, in clear breach of their alliance with Philip, due to their growing fear of Macedonian power. Cawkwell contends that from that moment on, Olynthos and the League were doomed. However, the next few years of Philip's reign appear to have been militarily quiet; Diodorus does not mention any activity by Philip until 349 BC. Philip did not yet make any further efforts to intervene in the Sacred War, which was to rumble on until 346 BC. In the meantime, there may have been some unrest in Macedonia; Philip executed one of his stepbrothers (sons of Amyntas III's second wife), and two more fled to Olynthos. According to Justin, this provided Philip with the pretext of attacking Olynthos and the Chalkidian League.

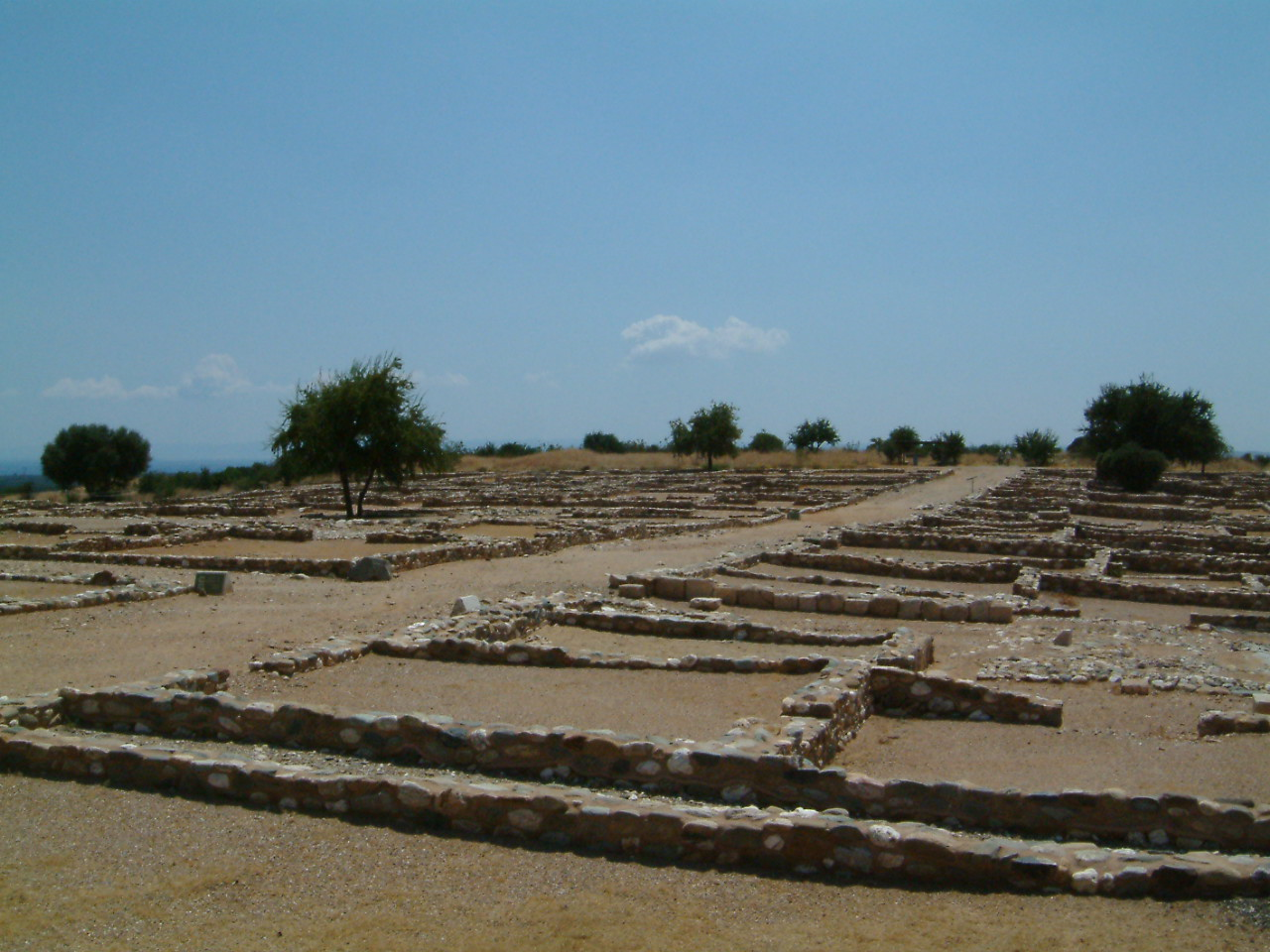
Ruins of ancient Olynthos

Philip finally began his campaign against the Chalkidian league in 349 BC, probably in July, when the Etesian winds would prevent Athens sending aid. Diodorus says that he started by besieging, capturing and razing the fortress of Zereia (possibly at or near Stageira). Philip seems to have methodically worked his way around the 32 cities of the League, leaving Olynthos to the end. At least some cities submitted to him, including Toroni and Mecyberna—a small town which acted as the harbour of Olynthos—having seen the fate of the cities which resisted Philip. By the spring of 348 BC, the western part of Chalkidiki had been lost, and the Olynthians resorted to ravaging their former territory.

Finally, in probably June 348 BC, with all the other cities captured or in submission, Philip moved to attack Olynthos. According to Diodorus, there were two pitched battles against the Olynthians; after being defeated twice, the Olynthians were then confined to the city. Two of the commanders of Olynthos, Euthycrates and Lasthenes, defected to Philip with 500 cavalry shortly before the siege. Diodorus therefore claims that the city fell by treachery; certainly treachery was committed, but it is not clear that this is how the city was captured. Either way, by September the siege was over, and the Chalkidian league had been annihilated. Philip razed the city, and sold the remaining inhabitants into slavery; the same fate awaited the other Chalkidian cities that had not submitted to him. Philip then incorporated Chalkidike into the Macedonian state, distributing the land amongst his followers.

=== Athens and the Olynthian War ===
When Philip began his attack in 349 BC, the Olynthians appealed to Athens for aid. In response, Demosthenes gave a series of speeches, now known as the Olynthiacs, encouraging the Athenians to resist Philip. The period from 351 BC to 346 BC marks the gradual ascendancy of Demosthenes in Athenian politics, as he became leader of the Athenian resistance to Philip. However, exactly when Demosthenes became important is disputed; Cawkwell points out that the chance preservation of a good proportion of Demosthenes's speeches may make him seem more important than he was. In the end, the Athenians decided to send a force of 2000 lightly armed mercenaries (referred to in the sources as peltasts, even if strictly speaking, they were not), and 38 triremes to aid the Olynthians. Of these triremes, 30 were already in service under Chares, possibly operating in the north Aegean; the other 8 were to be crewed by Athenians citizens. However, it is not clear whether this force achieved anything.

Later, in early 348 BC, the Olynthians appealed for help again. The Athenians sent Charidemos, a former general of Kersebleptes who had been adopted as an Athenian citizen, with 4000 peltasts, 150 cavalry and 18 triremes; of the triremes, 10 were probably already in his service, and the other 8 may have been those sent to Chares in 349 BC. Charidemus joined up with the Olynthians, and together they attacked the former territory of Olynthos in western Chalkidike. Finally, just before the final siege of Olynthos started, the Olynthians appealed a last time for aid. The Athenians prepared to send a force of citizen hoplites, but they were delayed by the weather, probably due to the Etesian winds, and arrive too late to achieve anything.

=== Euboea ===
Athens was prevented from sending more effective aid by events on Euboea in 348 BC. A pre-eminent politician from Chalcis, Callias, sought to unite the cities of Euboea in a new confederation, inevitably meaning the end of the hitherto strong Athenian presence on the island. Strategically, this was unacceptable for the Athenians. In 410 BC, the strait between Euboea and the mainland, the Euripos, had been narrowed, and then bridged at Chalcis. If Euboea, and in particular Chalcis, was no longer controlled by Athens then Philip could potentially cross into Euboea from Thessaly, and then cross back into Boeotia via the bridge at Chalcis, thus outflanking Thermopylae. The whole Athenian strategy in the years after 352 BC therefore required that they hold Euboea.

In early 348 BC, the Athenians were distracted by events on Euboea, and were in no position to send much help to Olynthos. However, the expedition the Athenians sent to Euboea to try to maintain their position on the island was a disaster, and the Athenians had to seek peace with Chalcis, thereby effectively losing control of the island. It is possible that Philip actually incited the revolt on Euboea, though it is considered more likely that this is a misreading of a speech of the Athenian politician Aeschines.

== End of the Sacred War (347–346 BC) ==
The Athenian politician Philocrates had suggested offering Philip peace in 348 BC, during the Olynthian war. However, the Athenian assembly had effectively rejected this proposal by putting Philocrates on trial, and by the time he was cleared of the charges, it was too late to save Olynthos. The war between Athens and Philip thus continued through 347 BC, as did the Sacred War. In 347 BC, Philip sent privateers to attack Athenians colonies on various Aegean islands. Meanwhile, it was becoming clear that the Sacred War could only be ended by outside intervention. The Phocians had occupied several Boeotian cities, but were running out of treasure to pay their mercenaries; conversely, the Thebans were unable to act effectively against the Phocians. The Phocian general Phalaikos was removed from his command in 347 BC, and three new generals appointed, who successfully attacked Boeotia again. The Thebans appealed to Philip for aid, and he sent a small force to their assistance. Philip sent force enough to honour his alliance with Thebes, but not enough to end the war—he desired the glory of ending the war personally, in the manner of his choosing, and on his terms.

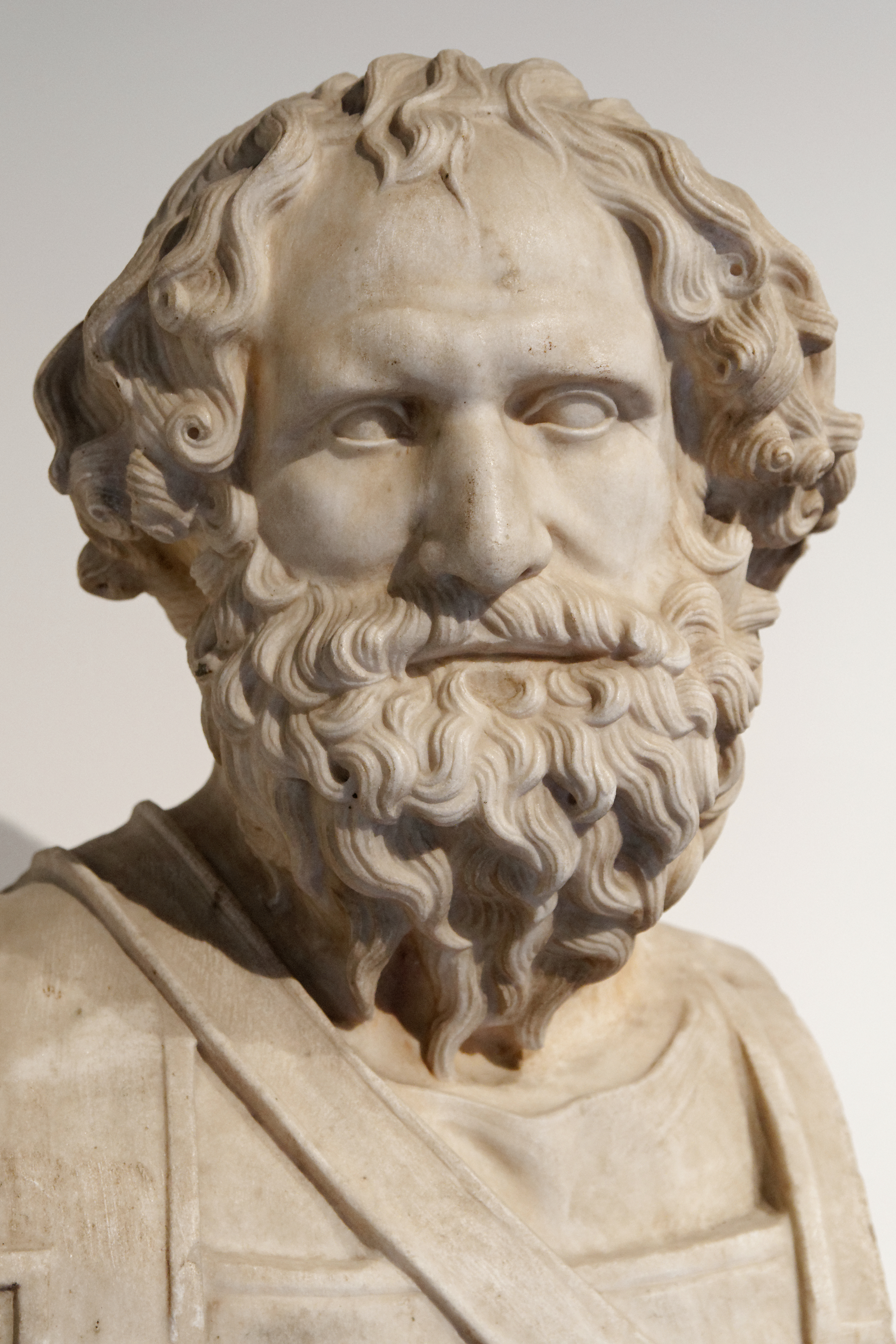
Bust of Archidamus III from the Villa of the Papyri in Herculaneum, now in the Naples National Archaeological Museum

In early 346 BC, Philip let it be known that he intended to march south with the Thessalians, though not where or why. The Phocians thus made plans to defend Thermopylae, and requested assistance from the Spartans and the Athenians, probably around 14 February. The Spartans dispatched Archidamos III with 1000 hoplites, and the Athenians ordered everyone eligible for military service under the age of 40 to be sent to the Phocians' aid. However, between the Phocians' appeal and the end of the month, all plans were upset by the return of Phalaikos to power in Phocis; the Athenians and the Spartans were subsequently told that they would not be permitted to defend Thermopylae. It is not clear from the ancient sources why Phalaikos was returned to power, nor why he adopted this dramatic change of policy. Cawkwell suggests, based on remarks of Aeschines that the Phocian army restored Phalaikos because they had not been properly paid, and further that Phalaikos, realizing that the army could not be paid and that the Phocians could no longer hope to win the war, decided to try to negotiate a peace settlement with Philip.

=== Peace with Athens ===
When the Athenians received this news, they rapidly changed policy. If Thermopylae could no longer be defended, then Athenian security could no longer be guaranteed. By the end of February, the Athenians had dispatched an embassy, including Philocrates, Demosthenes and Aeschines, to Philip to discuss peace between Athens and Macedon. The embassy had two audiences with Philip, in which each side presented their proposals for the terms of the peace settlement. The embassy then returned to Athens to present the proposed terms to the Athenian Assembly, along with a Macedonian embassy to Athens, empowered by Philip to finalize an agreement. The Athenians debated the peace treaty in April and tried to propose a common peace in which all Greek states could partake (including Phocis). However, Demosthenes (at this point a strong proponent of peace) persuaded the Assembly that Philip would never agree to such a peace, and that Athens's vulnerable position meant that they had little choice but to accept Philip's terms. On 23 April, the Athenians swore to the terms of the treaty which is now known as the Peace of Philocrates in the presence of the Macedonian ambassadors. Amongst the principal terms were that Athens become Philip's ally, and that they forever renounce their claim to Amphipolis.

=== End of Thracian independence ===
Following the first Athenian embassy to Macedon, Philip went on campaign against Kersebleptes. Details of the campaign are scarce, but it seems that Philip easily captured the Thracian treasury on the "Sacred Mountain". Then, rather than deposing Kersebleptes, he made him a subject ally, in the same manner as his brother Amadokos.

=== Settlement of the Sacred War ===
After agreeing to the peace terms with Macedonian ambassadors in April, the Athenians dispatched a second embassy to Macedon, to extract the peace oaths from Philip. When they arrived, the Athenians (again including Demosthenes and Aeschines) were rather surprised to find embassies from all the principal combatants in the Sacred War were also present, in order to discuss a settlement to the war. When Philip returned from Thrace he received all these embassies. The Thebans and Thessalians requested that he take the leadership of Greece, and punish Phocis; conversely, the Phocians, supported by the Spartans and the Athenian delegations, pleaded with Philip not to attack Phocis. Philip, however, delayed making any decisions; "[he] sought by every means not to reveal how he intended to settle things; both sides were privately encouraged to hope that he would do as they wanted, but both were bidden not to prepare for war; a peacefully arranged concordat was at hand"; he also delayed taking the oaths to the Peace of Philocrates. Military preparations were ongoing in Pella during this period, but Philip told the ambassadors that they were for a campaign against Halos, a small Thessalian city which held out against him. He departed for Halos before making any pronouncements, compelling the Athenian embassy to travel with him; only when they reached Pherae did Philip finally take the oaths, enabling the Athenian ambassadors to return home.

It was now that Philip applied the coup de grace. He had persuaded the Athenians and other Greeks that he and his army was heading for Halos, but it seems certain that he also sent other units straight to Thermopylae. All of central and southern Greece was now at Philip's mercy, and the Athenians could not now save Phocis even if they abandoned the peace. Philip could be certain of dictating the terms of the end of the Sacred War, since he could now use force against any state that did not accept his arbitration. He began by making a truce with Phalaikos on 19 July; Phalaikos surrendered Phocis to him, in return for him being allowed to leave, with his mercenaries, and go wherever he wished. Philip then declared that the fate of Phocis would not be decided by him, but by the Amphictyonic Council. However, it is clear that Philip was dictating the terms behind the scenes; allowing the Amphictyons the formal responsibility allowed him to dissociate himself from the terms in the future.

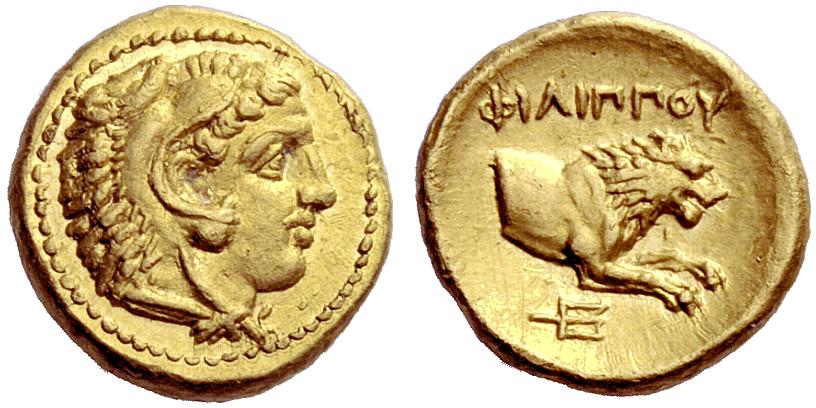
A gold half stater of Philip II of Macedon minted at Pella, with the head of young Heracles wearing the Nemean Lion's skin on the obverse and on the reverse the lion's forepart

In return for ending the war, Macedon was made a member of the Amphictyonic council, and given the two votes which had been stripped from Phocis. This was an important moment for Philip, since membership of the Ampictyony meant that Macedon was now no longer a 'barbarian' state in Greek eyes. The terms imposed on Phocis were harsh, but realistically Philip had no choice but to impose such sanctions; he needed the support of the Thessalians (sworn enemies of Phocis), and could not risk losing the prestige that he had won for his pious conduct during the war. Aside from being expelled from the Amphictyonic council, all the Phocian cities were to be destroyed, and the Phocians settled in 'villages' of no more than fifty houses; the money stolen from the temple was to be paid back at a rate of 60 talents per year; the Phocians were not, however, destroyed, and they retained their land. The Athenians, having made peace with Philip, were not penalised by the Amphictyonic council, and the Spartans also seem to have escaped lightly. Philip presided over the Amphictyonic festival in the autumn, and then much to the surprise of the Greeks, he went back to Macedon and did not return to Greece for seven years. He did however retain his access, by garrisoning the closest town to Thermopylae, Nicaea with Thessalian troops.

=== Summary to 346 BC ===
346 BC was another remarkable year for Philip. The city-states of Greece had exhausted themselves in the previous years, and Philip was therefore the only power capable of finally ending the Sacred War. Ultimately, once in control of Thermopylae, this military strength allowed him to settle the war by mere threat of force. Philip undoubtedly intended to settle the war even before the Thessalians and Thebans requested that he do so, and the terms on which the war was concluded were presumably much as he would have desired; coming to a separate peace with Athens was a bonus. Philip was, through his membership of the Amphictyonic council, now legitimized as a "true" Greek; and by the prestige he had gained for his pious conduct on behalf of Apollo, and by his military strength, he was now the de facto leader of the Greek city-states. Simon Hornblower suggests that Philip was the only real victor in the Sacred War. Furthermore, Philip's domination of northern Greece and the north Aegean was now almost complete, after his success in the Olynthian War and his subjugation of Kersebleptes. Diodorus sums up Philip's achievements in 346 BC:

Philip returned to Macedon, not only having gained a reputation for piety and superb generalship, but also having made considerable preparations for the increase of power that was destined to be his. For he wished to be appointed the commander-in-chief of Greece and to wage war against the Persians.

— Diodorus Siculus

There has been much debate amongst historians about Philip's motives and aims in 346 BC, with particular regard to Athens. Although Philip had made peace and alliance with Athens prior to his settlement of the Sacred War, they failed to send him troops he requested under the terms of the alliance. Although these troops were not ultimately needed by Philip, the Athenian failure to honour the terms gave Philip reasonable grounds for war. However, even when in possession of Thermopylae, he made no hostile moves towards Athens, and still prevented any punishment being meted on Athens by the Amphictyonic council. Why was Philip so lenient towards Athens? Cawkwell suggests that Philip was already beginning to contemplate a campaign against Persia in 346 BC (as tentatively suggested by Diodorus), for which purposes he desired the use of the powerful Athenian navy; hence his request for alliance, and his on-going patience with Athens. This may also provide another explanation for Philip's use of the Amphictyonic council to formally settle the Sacred War; if he was to campaign in Asia, he needed Greece to be peaceful, and a peace imposed through a pan-Greek organisation (backed with the threat of Macedonian intervention), was more likely to succeed than one directly imposed by Macedon.

== Reorganisation and retrenchment (345–342 BC) ==
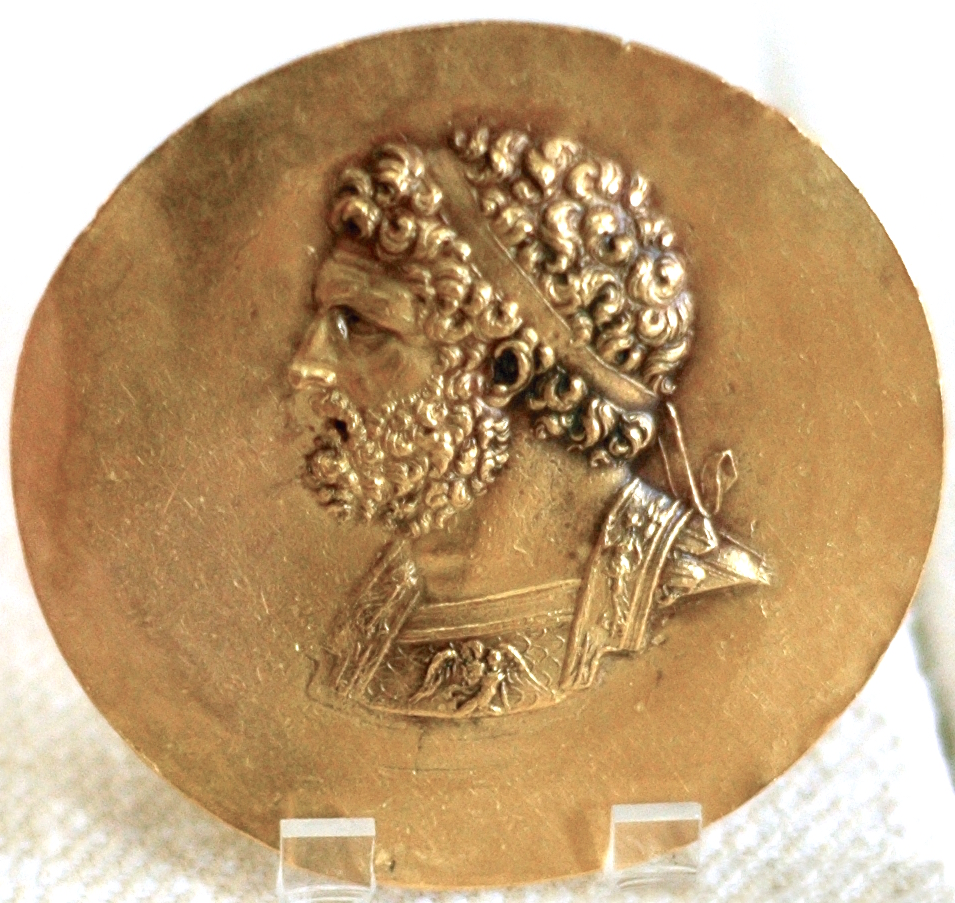
Niketerion (victory medallion) bearing the effigy of king Philip II of Macedon, 3rd century AD, probably minted during the reign of Roman Emperor Severus Alexander.

The next year, Philip returned to the ongoing business of restructuring Macedon. Justin reports that after returning to Macedon, he began transplanting parts of the population to new locations, in particular strengthening the cities of Macedon. This was probably to increase the security of the population, and promote trade; Alexander the Great would later recall that his father had brought "the Macedonians down from the hills to the plains".

=== Illyria (345 BC) ===
Philip then went on campaign against the Illyrians, particularly Pleuratus, whose Taulantii kingdom probably lay along the Drin river in modern Albania and was the main independent power in Illyria after Grabus' defeat. During the campaign, Philip suffered a smashed shin-bone, and was only saved from death by the bravery of his Companion cavalry (150 of whom were wounded in the process). Philip did not campaign in 344 or 343 BC, which may have been due to the effects of this severe injury. Instead, Philip contented himself with reorganising Thessaly in 344 BC, reinstating the ancient fourfold "Tetrarchic" administration system.

After Philip's Illyrian campaigns, the Illyrian ruler Cleitus was a vassal of Macedon. The previously defeated Grabaei, as well as perhaps the Ardiaei and Autariatae are usually considered vassals of Philip, although the evidence is weak. King Glaucias and his Taulantii were probably expelled from the border area of Dassaretia, but after the harsh battle against Philip they remained independent in the Adriatic coast.

=== Molossia and Cassopaea (342 BC) ===
The Molossian kingdom of Epirus had been an important subject ally of Macedon since 350 BC, when Philip had taken the son of king Arybbas, Alexander hostage. During this time at court, Alexander (brother of Philip's wife Olympias), had grown into an admirer of Philip, and Philip therefore decided to replace Arybbas with Alexander. The exact date this occurred is unclear; Cawkwell suggests this happened in early 342 BC, when Alexander would have been 20, as a prelude to his Thracian campaign. Arybbas went into exile in Athens, where he was promised help to regain his kingdom; however, Alexander would remain on the throne (and loyal to Philip) until his death in 334 BC. Philip certainly campaigned against the Epirote Cassopaeans in early 342 BC, taking control of three coastal cities (Pandosia, Elateia and Bucheta) to secure the southern regions of his kingdom.

== Thrace (342–340 BC) ==
In approximately June 342 BC, Philip set off on what must have been a long-planned expedition into Thrace. The campaign was to last for two years, but other than that his forces were large, and that he fought several battles, the ancient sources contain very few details. Undoubtedly Philip's primary aim was to depose Kersebleptes, who according to Diodorus had been causing problems for the Greeks on the Chersonese, once and for all. Philip ended the campaign by marrying Meda of Odessos, daughter of a king of the Getae, which has been taken to suggest that Philip campaigned not just in Thrace, but in the valley of the Hebrus, and north of the Great Balkan range of mountains, near the Danube.

During the campaign, Philip founded several cities, most notably Philippopolis on the site of the old Thracian fort of Eumolpia (modern Plovdiv, Bulgaria). A tithe was levied on the Thracians, and the new post of "general in charge of Thrace" may have been established at this time, effectively governor of a new Macedonian province of Thrace. To pacify the north of this region, the Thracians were left mostly independent, under their own kings, who were subject to Philip. Cawkwell rates this extended campaign as one of Philip's major achievements, given the terrain and severe winter conditions.

== Perinthos and Byzantion (340–339 BC) ==
At the end of his Thracian campaign, Philip moved against the city of Perinthos, formerly his ally. Diodorus says that this was because the city had begun to oppose him, and favour the Athenians; however, from Athenian sources, there is no indication that this was the case. One possible explanation is that Perinthos had refused to send aid to Philip during the Thracian campaign, and it was for this reason he decided to attack it. Either way, since Perinthos was a Greek city, Philip's actions gave the Athenian war-party the excuse it had been looking for to disrupt the peace Philip had wrought in Greece, thereby starting a new phase in the wars.

=== Breakdown of the Peace ===
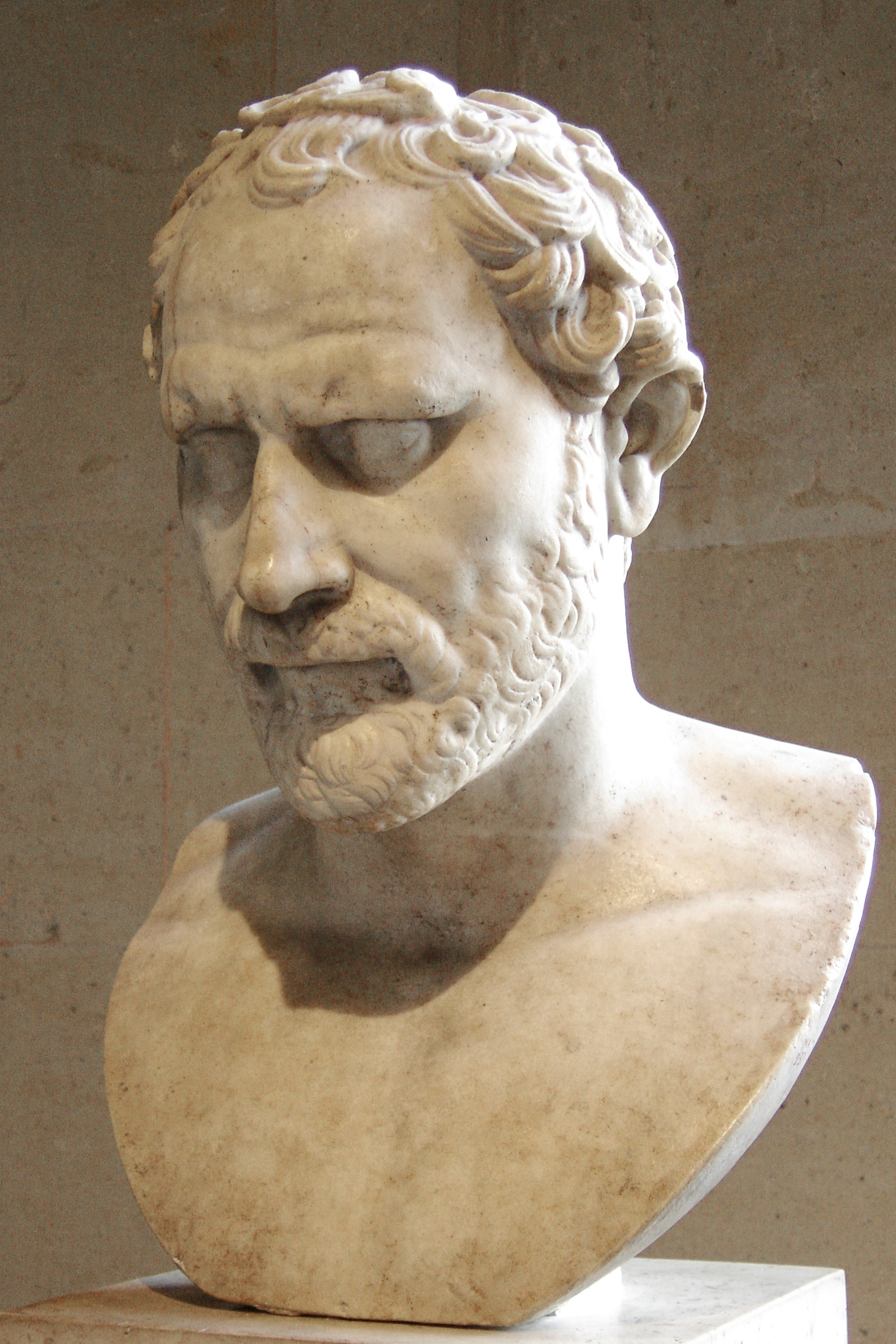
Bust of the Athenian politician Demosthenes

Although Demosthenes had been a principal architect of the Peace of Philocrates, almost as soon as it was made, he wished to be rid of it. Over the next few years, Demosthenes became leader of the "war-party" in Athens, and at every opportunity he sought to undermine the peace: "His method was simple and effective. He kept hammering away at untruths until enough Athenians came to believe them." Demosthenes believed that all Philip's successes were due to his bribery and corruption of the Greeks, a view which, although there is little evidence for it, became commonplace until re-examined by modern historians. Conversely, there was also a substantial body of feeling in Athens, led by Aeschines, that the peace should be maintained and developed.

From 343 BC onwards, in order to try to disrupt the peace, Demosthenes and his followers used every expedition and action of Philip to argue that he was breaking the peace. One of the first points of conflict may have been Thasos and the north Aegean piracy. The weakening of Athens' naval hegemony and the use of privateers in the last war had led to a resurgence of piracy. In parallel, Philip's continually improving financial situation had allowed him to start building a navy by 342 BC, something that did not pass undetected in Athens. Philip's new navy had occupied the small island of Halonnesus in the northern Aegean after expelling the pirates who had seized the island. Its return during the Philocrates peace became a diplomatic claim by the orator Hegesippus, a Demosthenes supporter. In general, the anti-Macedonian party had allowed or promoted the use of the island of Thasos, in front of the Macedonian and Thracian coastline, as a pirate safe harbor. The Athenians also made similar use of other islands and ports in Thrace. Thasos' internal politics was in the meantime divided between pro and anti-Athenian parties with their continental interests having been seized by Philip during his earlier conquests. Demosthenes refers to Thasos as independent in 340 but the subsequent references to Thasos had been construed by scholars like Rubensohn as suggesting it may have fallen to Philip in 340–338.

Finally, in 341 BC, matters began to come to a head. Athens sent out new settlers to the cleruchs on the Chersonsese under the command of Diopeithes, who proceeded to ravage the territory of Cardia, an ally of Philip. Philip therefore wrote to the Athenians to demand that they desist, but in his speech 'On the Chersonese', Demosthenes persuaded the Athenians that since Athens was effectively at war with Philip anyway, there was no need to do what Philip asked; Diopeithes therefore continued to cause trouble in Thrace. Then, in the Third Philippic of approximately May 341 BC, Demosthenes accused Philip of breaking the peace by intervening in the affairs of Euboea. Finally, in the Fourth Philippic delivered later in 341 BC, Demosthenes argued that Athens should send an embassy to the Persian king, requesting money for a forthcoming war with Macedon. The embassy was sent, much to Philip's anger, but was sharply rebuffed by the Persians.

=== Perinthos ===
Against this fraught background, Philip started the siege of Perinthos in July 340 BC. Perinthos occupied a strong position on a hill rising to 56 meters, with its own port. Philip did not have a large enough fleet to blockade the port, meaning that Perinthos could be supplied from outside; Philip would therefore have to assault the city. Philip's engineers constructed siege towers (some allegedly 80 cubits high), battering rams and mines for the assault, and in a short time, a section of the wall was breached. However, fighting uphill through the city proved difficult, with the rings of houses providing impromptu defence lines for the Perinthians. Aid, both material and military, now began arriving at Perinthos; the Persian king ordered his satraps on the coast of Asia Minor to send money, food and weapons to the city, while the Byzantians sent a body of soldiers and their best generals.

=== Byzantion ===
The Byzantians' actions meant that they too were now at war with Philip. He continued the siege of Perinthos, but now (September) sent half his army to besiege Byzantion. Byzantion was a more important city for Philip, because of its control of the Bosphorus;

[Perinthos] did not really matter to Athens. [Byzantion] did. The corn-ships on their way to Athens down the Bosphorus could still be conveyed past the city, but even so, there was the danger of serious interruption. Given a moderate fleet, whoever controlled [Byzantion] could cause the greatest alarm in Athens.

— George Cawkwell

Demosthenes was determined to prevent the capture of the city, and went on an embassy to Byzantion, which agreed to form an alliance with Athens. The Athenians general Chares was already in the vicinity with 40 ships, and was sent to support Byzantion; furthermore, Byzantion's other allies, Chios, Rhodes and Kos also sent aid to the city. Since he still did not control the seas, Philip already faced a difficult task to besiege Byzantion, made all the more difficult by the outside support. Again, Philip's engineers set to work, and created a breach; a night assault was then made, but was repulsed. Frustrated in the two sieges, Philip now lost patience with the Athenians, and wrote to them, declaring war. In Athens, Demosthenes proposed that the Athenians should respond by declaring war on Philip; the motion was passed, and the stone tablet recording the peace of Philocrates destroyed. The Athenians prepared another fleet under the command of Phocion, and dispatched it to Byzantion.

The first act in this new war was Philip's seizure of 230 grain ships that had been waiting on the far side of the Bosphorus to be convoyed past Byzantion by Chares. He used the grain for his own supplies and the ships' timbers to build siege engines. However, what happened over the next few months is unclear; although to judge by Philip's activities in 339 BC, he cannot have spent more than three months besieging Byzantion. The walls of Byzantion were very tall and strong, and the city was full of defenders, and well supplied by sea; it is therefore possible Philip gave up on the siege, rather than waste time and men trying to assault it. The Greeks viewed this, and the abandonment of the siege of Perinthos, as a glorious victory. Philip's motives are as unclear as ever; Cawkwell suggests that, since he was now at war with Athens, he decided to go straight to the root of the problem, rather than be detained at Byzantion.

== Philip's final campaigns (339–338 BC) ==
=== Scythia ===
As a prelude to his planned campaign in Greece, Philip went on campaign in the winter of 339 BC, against the Scythians living south of the Danube, near the river's mouth (in Dobruja). He defeated them in battle, taking many captive, and built a statue of Heracles to commemorate his victory. He then marched through the territory of the Triballi in a demonstration of force, which probably lay upstream along the course of the Danube. During a skirmish, he was severely wounded in the leg when a spear passed through it and killed the horse he was riding. Recovering from this wound may have delayed Philip's campaign in Greece, since he did not set off until the autumn of 339 BC.

=== Fourth Sacred War ===
Philip's campaign in Greece became linked with a new, fourth, sacred war. The citizens of Amphissa in Ozolian Locris had begun cultivating land sacred to Apollo on the Crisaean plain south of Delphi; after some internal bickering the Amphictyonic council decided to declare a sacred war against Amphissa. A Thessalian delegate proposed that Philip should be made leader of the Amphictyonic forces, which therefore gave Philip a pretext to campaign in Greece; it is, however, probable that Philip would have gone ahead with his campaign anyway.

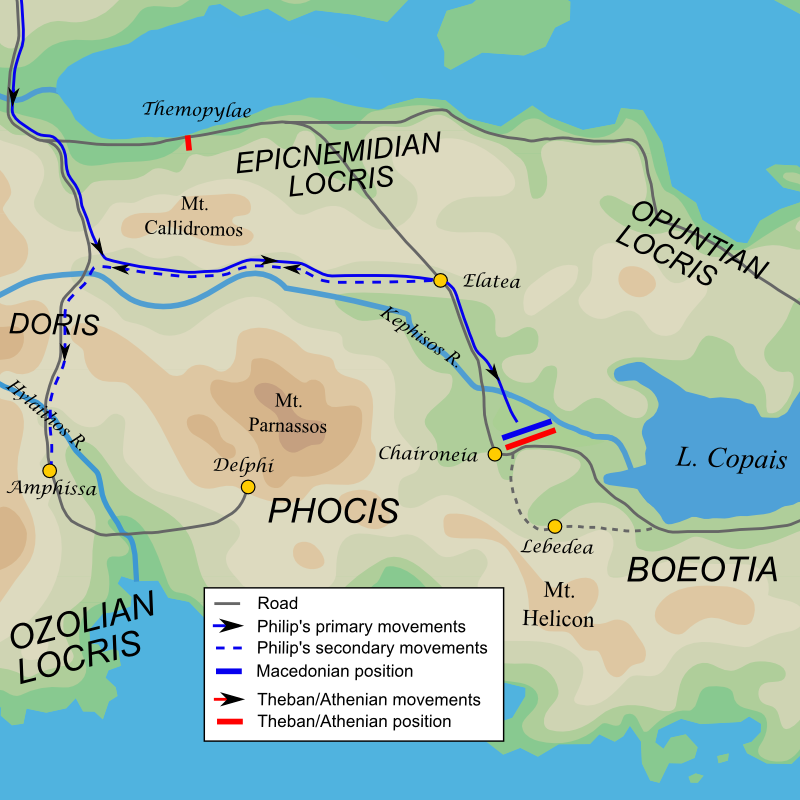
Map showing Philip's movements during 339–338 BC

At the start of the 339 BC, the Thebans had seized the town of Nicaea near Thermopylae, which Philip had garrisoned in 346 BC. Philip does not appear to have treated this as a declaration of war, but it nevertheless presented him with a significant problem, blocking the main route into Greece. However, a second route into central Greece was available. In 480 BC, during the Battle of Thermopylae, the Persian king Xerxes had sent his army via a mountain track (the Anopea) to outflank the pass. From this track, on the western side of Mount Kallidromon, another road led off and descended in Phocis. In 480 BC, a thousand Phocian troops were stationed above Thermopylae to guard the road and prevent a Persian assault on Phocis (though they notably failed to prevent the Persians using Anopea). However, in 339 BC, the Greeks had either forgotten the existence of this road, or believed that Philip would not use it; the subsequent failure to guard this road allowed Philip to slip into central Greece unhindered.

Philip's relatively lenient treatment of the Phocians in 346 BC now bore fruit. Reaching Elatea, he ordered the city to be re-populated, and during the next few months the whole Phocian confederation was restored to its former state. This provided Philip with a base in Greece, and new, grateful allies in the Phocians. Philip probably arrived in Phocis in November 339 BC, but the decisive phase of the campaign did not occur until August 338 BC. During this period Philip discharged his responsibility to the Amphictyonic council by settling the situation in Amphissa. He tricked a force of 10,000 mercenaries who were guarding the road from Phocis to Amphissa into abandoning their posts, then took Amphissa and expelled its citizens, turning it over to Delphi. He probably also engaged in diplomatic attempts to try to avoid further conflict in Greece, although if so, he was unsuccessful. The Amphictyonic council decided to hold a special session two or three months later. The Athenians and the Thebans did not send envoys to this council.

=== Alliance between Athens and Thebes ===
When news first arrived that Philip was in Elatea, just three days march away, there was panic in Athens. In what Cawkwell describes as his proudest moment, Demosthenes alone counselled against despair, and proposed that the Athenians should seek an alliance with the Thebans; his decree was passed, and he was sent as ambassador. Philip had also sent an embassy to Thebes, requesting that the Thebans join him, or at least allow him to pass through Boeotia unhindered. Since the Thebans were still not formally at war with Philip, they could have avoided the conflict altogether. However, in spite of Philip's proximity, and their traditional enmity with Athens, they chose to ally with the Athenians, in the cause of liberty for Greece. The Athenian army had already pre-emptively been sent in the direction of Boeotia, and was therefore able to join the Thebans within days of the alliance being agreed.

The details of the campaign leading up to the decisive Battle of Chaeronea are almost completely unknown. Philip was presumably prevented from entering Boeotia by way of Mount Helikon, as the Spartans had done in the run-up to the Battle of Leuctra, or by any of the other mountain passes. There were certainly some preliminary skirmishes; Demosthenes alludes to a "winter battle" and "battle on the river" in his speeches, but no other details are preserved. Finally, in August 338 BC, Philip's army marched straight down the main road from Phocis to Boeotia, to assault the allied Greek army defending the road at Chaeronea.

=== The Battle of Chaeronea ===
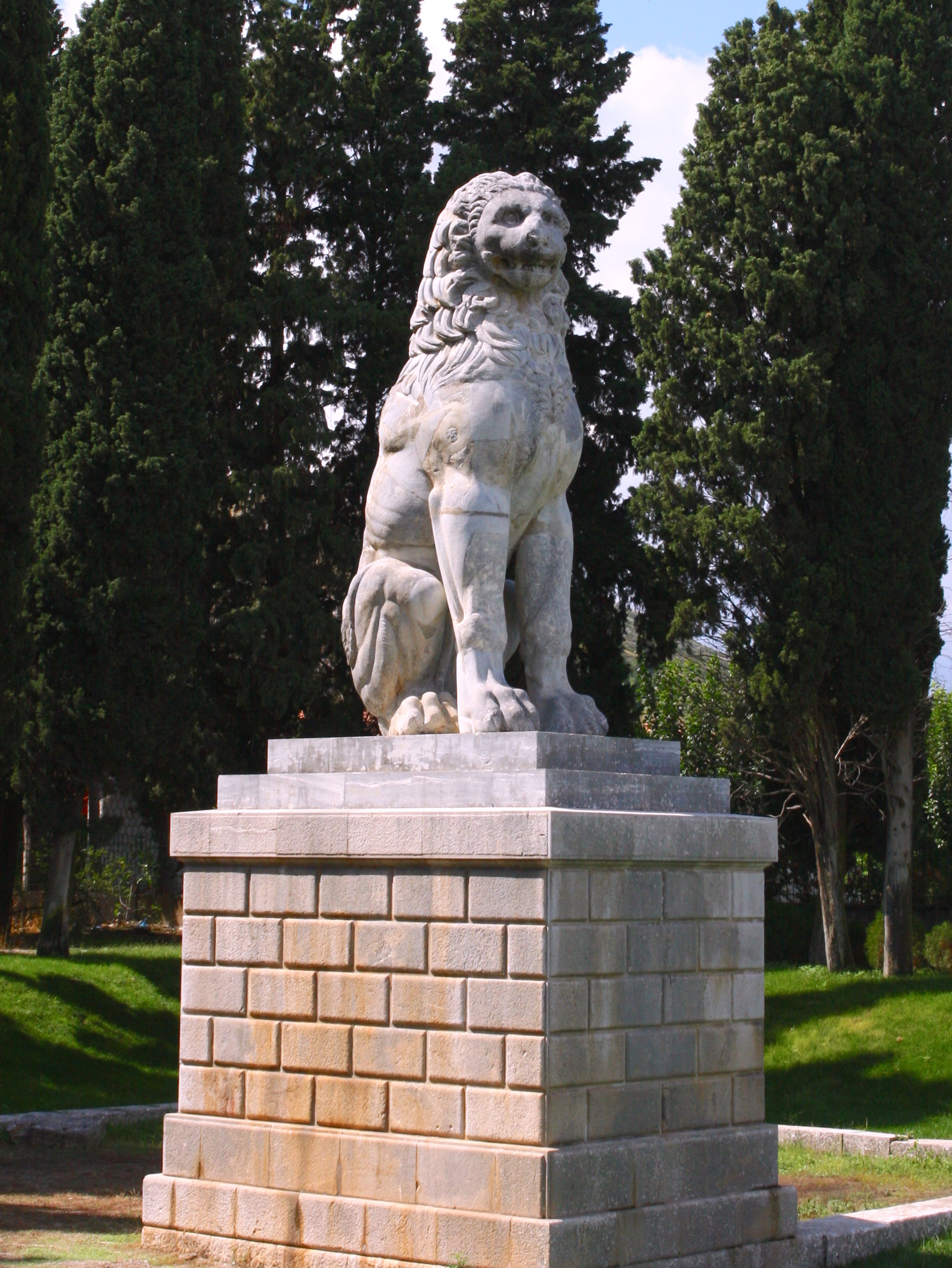
The Lion of Chaeronea, erected by the Thebans to honor the dead from the Battle of Chaeronea (338 BC), described by the ancient geographer Pausanias and discovered by the British architect George Ledwell Taylor in the early 19th century.

The allied Greek army had taken up a position near Chaeronea, astride the main road. On the left flank, the allied Greek line lay across the foothills of Mount Thurion, blocking the side-road that led to Lebedea, while on the right, the line rested against the Kephisos river, near a projecting spur of Mount Aktion. The allied Greek army included contingents from Achaea, Corinth, Chalcis, Epidaurus, Megara and Troezen, with the majority of troops being supplied by Athens and Thebes, thus making it an army of allied cities of southern Greece, that had been traditionally self-governed for centuries. The Athenian contingent was led by the generals Chares and Lysicles, and the Thebans by Theagenes. No source provides exact numbers for the allied Greek army; the modern view is that the allied Greek numbers were approximately equal to those of the Macedonians, who according to Diodorus numbered roughly 30,000 infantry and 2,000 cavalry. Philip took command of the right wing of the Macedonian wing and placed his 18-year-old son Alexander (the future Alexander the Great) in command of the left wing, accompanied by a group of Philip's experienced generals.

Details of the battle itself are scarce, with Diodorus providing the only formal account. He says that "once joined, the battle was hotly contested for a long time and many fell on both sides, so that for a while the struggle permitted hopes of victory to both." He then recounts that the young Alexander, "his heart set on showing his father his prowess" succeeding in rupturing the allied Greek line aided by his companions, and eventually put the allied Greek right wing to flight; meanwhile, Philip advanced in person against the allied Greek left and also put it to flight. This brief account can be filled out, if Polyaenus's anecdotes related to the battle (found in his work Stratagems) are to be believed. Polyaenus's accounts have led some modern historians to tentatively propose the following synthesis of the battle. After the general engagement had been in progress for some time, Philip had his army perform a wheeling manoeuver, with the right wing withdrawing, and the whole line pivoting around its centre. At the same time, wheeling forward, the Macedonian left wing attacked the Thebans on the allied Greek right and punched a hole in the allied Greek line. On the allied Greek left, the Athenians followed Philip, their line becoming stretched and became disordered; the Macedonians then turned, attacked and routed the tired and inexperienced Athenians. The allied Greek right wing, under the assault of the Macedonian troops under Alexander's command, then were also routed, ending the battle. Diodorus says that more than 1000 Athenians died in the battle, with another 2000 taken prisoner, and that the Thebans fared similarly. Cawkwell suggests that this was one of the most decisive battles in ancient history; since there was now no army which could prevent Philip's advance, the war effectively ended.

== Settlement of Greece and League of Corinth (337–336 BC) ==
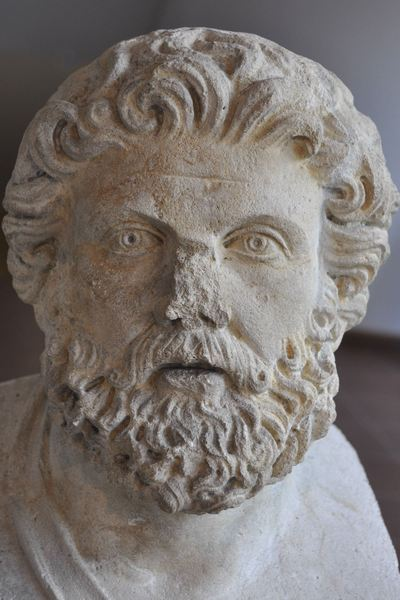
A Roman era sculpture of Philip II of Macedon, 350-400 AD, Rheinisches Landesmuseum Trier

In the aftermath of Chaeronea, records show desperate attempts in Athens and Corinth to re-build the city walls, as they prepared for Philip to lay siege to them. However, Philip had no intention of besieging any city, nor indeed of conquering Greece. Himself also being Greek, he wanted the rest of the Greeks as his allies for his planned campaign against the Persians, and he wanted to leave a stable Greece in his rear when he went on campaign; further fighting was therefore contrary to his aims. Philip marched first to Thebes, which surrendered to him; he expelled the Theban leaders who had opposed him, recalled those pro-Macedonian Thebans who had previously been exiled, and installed a Macedonian garrison. He also ordered that the Boeotian cities of Plataea and Thespiae, which Thebes had destroyed in previous conflicts, be re-founded. Generally, Philip treated the Thebans severely, making them pay for the return of their prisoners, and even to bury their dead; he did not, however, dissolve the Boeotian confederacy.

By contrast, Philip treated Athens very leniently indeed; although the Second Athenian League was dissolved, the Athenians were allowed to keep their colony on Samos, and their prisoners were freed without ransom. Philip's motives are not entirely clear, but one likely explanation is that he hoped to use the Athenian navy in his campaign against Persia, since Macedon did not possess a substantial fleet; he therefore needed to remain on good terms with the Athenians. Philip also made peace with the other combatants, Corinth and Chalcis, which controlled important strategic locations; both received Macedonian garrisons. He then turned to deal with Sparta, which had not taken part in the conflict, but was likely to take advantage of the weakened state of the other Greek cities to try to attack its neighbours in the Peloponnese. The Spartans refused Philip's invitation to engage in discussions, so Philip ravaged Lacedaemonia, but did not attack Sparta itself.

=== League of Corinth ===
Philip seems to have moved around Greece in the months after the battle, making peace with the states that opposed him, dealing with the Spartans, and installing garrisons; his movements also probably served as a demonstration of force to the other cities, lest they oppose him. In mid-337 BC, he seems to have camped near Corinth, and began the work to establish a league of the Greek city-states, which would guarantee peace in Greece, and provide Philip with military assistance against Persia. The result, the League of Corinth, was formed in the latter half of 337 BC at a congress organised by Philip. All states signed up to the league, with the exception of Sparta. The principal terms of the concord were that all members became allied to each other, and to Macedon, and that all members were guaranteed freedom from attack, freedom of navigation, and freedom from interference in internal affairs. Philip, and the Macedonian garrisons installed in Greece, would act as the 'keepers of the peace'. At Philip's behest, the synod of the League then declared war on Persia, and voted Philip as Strategos for the forthcoming campaign.

== War with Persia and death of Philip (336 BC) ==
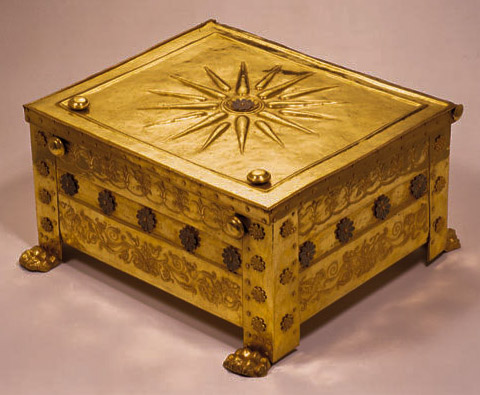
The golden larnax that was buried with Philip II of Macedon in his tomb at Vergina (Aigai), featuring the Vergina Sun design, the royal symbol of the Argead dynasty.

In 336 BC, whilst the invasion of Persia was in its very early stage, Philip was assassinated in Aegae by the captain of his bodyguard, Pausanias, whilst attending the wedding of his daughter by Olympias, Cleopatra, to Olympias's brother (and Cleopatra's uncle) Alexander I of Epirus. Philip's son Alexander III by Olympias was proclaimed king by the Macedonian army and by the Macedonian noblemen.

== Aftermath ==
=== Accession of Alexander ===
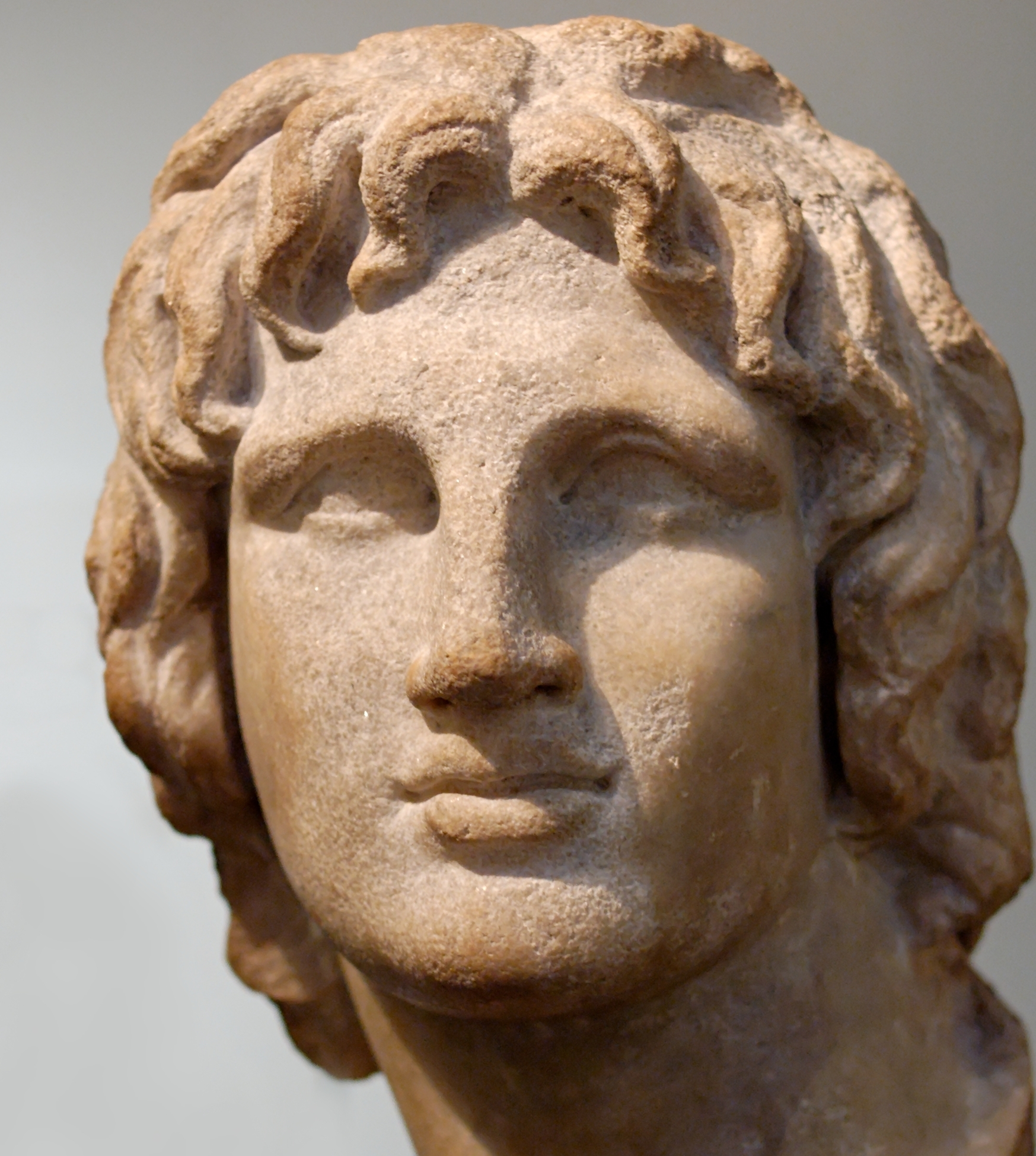
Bust of a young Alexander the Great from the Hellenistic period, British Museum

Alexander began his reign by having his potential rivals to the throne murdered. He had his cousin, the former Amyntas IV, executed, as well as having two Macedonian princes from the region of Lyncestis killed, while a third, Alexander Lyncestes, was spared. Olympias had Cleopatra Eurydice and her daughter by Philip, Europa, burned alive. When Alexander found out about this, he was furious with his mother. Alexander also ordered the murder of Attalus, who was in command of the advance guard of the army in Asia Minor. Attalus was at the time in correspondence with Demosthenes, regarding the possibility of defecting to Athens. Regardless of whether Attalus actually intended to defect, he had already severely insulted Alexander, and having just had Attalus's daughter and grandchildren murdered, Alexander probably felt Attalus was too dangerous to leave alive. Alexander spared the life of his half-brother Arrhidaeus, who was by all accounts somewhat mentally disabled, possibly as a result of poisoning by Olympias.

News of Philip's death roused many states into revolt, including Thebes, Athens, Thessaly, and the Thracian tribes to the north of Macedon. When news of the revolts in Greece reached Alexander, he responded quickly. Though his advisors advised him to use diplomacy, Alexander mustered the Macedonian cavalry of 3,000 men and rode south towards Thessaly, Macedon's neighbor to the south. When he found the Thessalian army occupying the pass between Mount Olympus and Mount Ossa, he had the men ride over Mount Ossa. When the Thessalians awoke the next day, they found Alexander in their rear, and promptly surrendered, adding their cavalry to Alexander's force, as he rode down towards the Peloponnesus. Alexander stopped at Thermopylae, where he was recognized as the leader of the Amphictyonic League before heading south to Corinth. Athens sued for peace and Alexander received the envoy and pardoned anyone involved with the uprising. At Corinth, he was given the title Hegemon, and like Philip, appointed commander of the forthcoming war against Persia.

=== Balkan campaign ===
Before crossing to Asia, Alexander wanted to safeguard his northern borders; in the spring of 335 BC, he advanced to suppress several apparent revolts. Starting from Amphipolis, he first went east into the country of the "Independent Thracians", and at Mount Haemus, the Macedonian army attacked and defeated a Thracian army manning the heights. The Macedonians marched on into the country of the Triballi, and proceeded to defeat the Triballian army near the Lyginus river (a tributary of the Danube). Alexander then advanced for three days on to the Danube, encountering the Getae tribe on the opposite shore. Surprising the Getae by crossing the river at night, he forced the Getae army to retreat after the first cavalry skirmish, leaving their town to the Macedonian army. News then reached Alexander that Cleitus, king of Illyria, and King Glaukias of the Taulantii were in open revolt against Macedonian authority. Marching west into Illyria, Alexander defeated each in turn, forcing Cleitus and Glaukias to flee with their armies, leaving Alexander's northern frontier secure.

While he was triumphantly campaigning in the north, a rumour of his death caused the Thebans and Athenians to rebel against Macedonian hegemony once more. Alexander reacted immediately but, while the other cities hesitated when he advanced into Greece, Thebes decided to resist with the utmost vigor. However, the resistance was useless, and the city was captured and then razed to the ground, and its territory was divided between the other Boeotian cities. The end of Thebes cowed Athens into submission, leaving all of Greece at least outwardly at peace with Alexander. With Macedon's vassals and allies once again peaceable, Alexander was finally free to take control of the stalled war with Persia, and in early 334 BC he crossed with an army of 42,000 men into Asia Minor.

=== Alexander's campaigns in Asia ===
Alexander's 10-year campaign in Asia, and the Macedonian conquest of the Persian empire, were to become the stuff of legend. The Macedonian army campaigned in Asia Minor, the Levant, Egypt, Assyria, Babylonia and Persia, winning notable battles at the Granicus, the Issus and Gaugamela, before the final collapse of Darius's rule in 330 BC. Alexander thus became ruler of the extensive Persian domains, although his rule over most of the territory was far from secure. Alexander continued campaigning in central Asia in the following years, before crossing into the Indian sub-continent. However, the Macedonian army became increasingly unhappy, and eventually mutinied, forcing Alexander to turn back. Alexander spent his final years attempting to consolidate his empire and planning future campaigns but, probably exhausted by years of hard campaigning, he died in Babylon in 323 BC.

== See also ==
- Government of Macedonia (ancient kingdom)
- History of Macedonia (ancient kingdom)

== Notes ==
a: "... The victory over Bardylis made him an attractive ally to the Epirotes, who too had suffered at the Illyrians' hands ..."
b: Although Pausanias, the 2nd century AD geographer, claimed that Sparta was expelled from the Amphictyonic council for her part in the Sacred War, inscriptions at Delphi show that this was not the case.
c: Ever since the murder, there have been many suspicions that Pausanias was actually hired to murder Philip. Suspicion has fallen upon Alexander, Olympias and even the newly crowned Persian Emperor, Darius III. All three of these people had motive to have Philip murdered.
d: For a critical review of scholars defending one view or the others, A. J. Graham provides a recapitulation during the analysis of Thasos and Portus in Colony and Mother City in Ancient Greece, explaining both Rubensohn thesis, Pouilloux objections and the indirect support for each one.
e: Philip married Phila of Elimeia, the sister of the last independent king of Elimea. Machatas of Elimeia, brother of Phila, is associated with the Machatas described by Plutarch as punished by Philip as part of his court. Similarly, Aeropus of Lyncestis appears as a commander in Cheronea and was exiled by Philip. His sons, Arrhabaeus, Heromenes and Alexander Lyncestes, also appear in Philip's court and during the politics surrounding his murder. Carney provided a detailed analysis of the impact of Macedonian annexation in Lyncestis when discussing the figure of Alexander Lyncestes
