= Lycophron (disambiguation) =

Lycophron or Lycophro (Greek: Λυκόφρων) may refer to:

- Lycophron, Hellenistic tragic poet and possible author of the poem Alexandra or Cassandra
- Lycophron of Corinth, son of Periander, the seventh-century BC tyrant of Corinth
- Lycophron (Sophist), a sophist mentioned by Aristotle
- Lycophron I of Pherae, establisher of the tyranny of Pherae, to which his son Jason of Pherae succeeded
- Lycophron II of Pherae, cousin or nephew of Jason of Pherae, and possible joint tyrant with his brother Tisiphonus: see Rise of Macedon
- Lycophron (mythology), an Achaean warrior during the Trojan War.
- Lycophron titan, a species of Ordovician trilobite.
