= Menelaus (disambiguation) =

Menelaus (/ˌmɛnɪˈleɪəs/; Ancient Greek: Μενέλαος, Menelaos), is one of the two most known Atrides, a king of Sparta and son of Atreus and Aerope.

Menelaus may also refer to:

== Astronomy ==
- 1647 Menelaus, Jovian asteroid
- Menelaus (crater) on the Moon

== People and mythology ==
- Menelaus of Macedon (various)
  - Menelaus (son of Amyntas III)
  - Menelaus (son of Lagus), brother of Ptolemy I Soter
  - Menelaus of Pelagonia who received Athenian citizenship
- Menelaus (High Priest), 2nd century BC High Priest of the Second Temple
- Menelaus, pupil of Stephanus (fl. 33 BC) sculptor in the workshop of Pasiteles in the time of Caesar Augustus
- Menelaus of Alexandria, a Hellenistic mathematician and astronomer
  - Menelaus's theorem, a theorem attributed to Menelaus of Alexandria

== Contemporary ==
- Jane Menelaus (born 1959), Australian actress

== Places ==
- Menelaus Portus, ancient port
