= Zereia =

Zereia (Ancient Greek: Ζερεία), also known as Zeira, was a town of Chalcidice, in ancient Macedonia.

It probably belonged to the Delian League since it appears in the tribute registry of Athens for the year 422/1 BCE, where it had to pay a phoros of 500 drachmas although it does not appear in any other tribute registry.

It has been suggested that it is related to a passage from Stephanus of Byzantium that collects a fragment of Theopompus that mentions the Zeranians (Ζηράνιοι) located in Thrace and another fragment of Ephorus that indicates the name of the region of Zerania (Ζηρανία).

Its site is unlocated.
