= Battle of Upper Macedon (360 BC) =

Battle between Bardylis and Perdiccas III

- Part of Macedonian campaigns of Bardylis
Date	360 or 359 BC
Location	Upper Macedonia
Result	Illyrian victory
Territorial changes	Upper Macedon conquered by Bardylis

Belligerents
Illyrian kingdom	Kingdom of Macedon

Commanders and leaders
Bardylis	Perdiccas III of Macedon †

Strength
Unknown	6,000 Infantrymen; 200 Cavalrymen

Casualties and losses
Unknown	4,000 killed

The Battle of Upper Macedon was fought either in October 360 or early spring or summer of 359 BC between Perdiccas III, King of Macedon, and Bardylis, King of the Dardanians.

== Background ==
The Dardanians, under the leadership of Bardylis, frequently launched invasions and raids against Macedonia and neighboring kingdoms.

In 393 BC, Bardylis invaded Macedonia and won a decisive battle against Amyntas III, driving him out and establishing control over lower Macedonia through a puppet ruler named Argaois Bardylis' forces advanced as far as the Thermaic Gulf, bringing key cities like the capital Pella and former capital Aigai under Dardanian control. Although Amyntas managed to reclaim Macedonia from Dardanian control in 392/1 BC, with support of the Thessalians, the persistent Dardanian raids forced him to begin paying an annual tribute to Bardylis by 382 BC.

== Battle ==
Bardylis launched an invasion of Macedon either in October 360 BC or in the early spring or summer of 359 BC. When Perdiccas learned of the incursion, he mobilized an army of six thousand infantry and two hundred cavalry to confront Bardylis. The exact location of the battle remains uncertain, but it is believed to have occurred in Upper Macedonia. Perdiccas's army was almost completely annihilated, with 4,000 soldiers killed, including Perdiccas himself, who was slain by Bardylis in single combat. The surviving soldiers were panic-stricken, deeply fearful of the Dardanian army, and had lost the morale to continue the war.

The death of the third king within a decade was widely perceived as a sign of weakness for the Macedonian monarchy.

== Aftermath ==
After Perdiccas III's death, his infant son, Amyntas IV, was chosen as the next king. Philip II was appointed as the child's tutor and regent. However, several months later, Philip II deposed his nephew. Philip then declared himself king and immediately sought peace with Bardylis.

=== Battle of Erigon Valley ===
In 358 BC, Philip II marched towards Dardanian-occupied Upper Macedon with a newly trained force of ten thousand infantry and six hundred cavalry. Bardylis initially sought peace but refused to return any conquered land. Philip declined the offer, stating he would only accept peace if Bardylis withdrew from Upper Macedon. Unwilling to relinquish his gains without a fight, Bardylis at the age of 90 gathered a similarly sized army of ten thousand infantry and five hundred cavalry to confront Philip. The two forces met in Lynkestis. Despite similar numbers, Philip's reformed phalanx proved better. The Macedonians secured a victory against the Dardanian forces. Bardylis was killed, and his army was forced to withdraw.
