= Menelaus of Pelagonia =

4th-century BC ruler of Pelagonia

Menelaus (/ˌmɛnɪˈleɪəs/; Ancient Greek: Μενέλαος, Menelaos) was a local ruler of Pelagonia, honoured as euergetes ("benefactor") of Athens in 363 BC, for helping Athenians in the war against Amphipolis and the Chalcidian League. In the decree it is stated that not only Menelaus himself but also his ancestors were benefactors of Athens. Soon after, he probably fled to Athens and received Athenian citizenship and is the "Menelaus, son of Arrhabaeus" honoured as Athenian proxenos in Troy (~ 359 BC) and the Menelaus, commander of the cavalry against Philip II of Macedon mentioned by Demosthenes.

== See also ==
- Greeks in North Macedonia
