= Lycophron II of Pherae =

Tyrant of Pherae from 355/4 BC to 352 BC

Lycophron
- Tyrant of Pherae
- Reign: 355/54 - 352 BC
- Predecessor: Tisiphonus
- Successor: Peitholaus
- Father: Jason of Pherae

Lycophron (Ancient Greek: Λυκόφρων), son of Jason of Pherae, was a co-tyrant of Pherae (355/4-352 BC), ruling alongside his brother Peitholaus. He was also one of the murderers of Alexander of Pherae.

Lycophron and Peitholaus succeeded their elder brother Tisiphonus as co-tyrants of Pherae in c. 355/4 BC.

In 352 BC, Lycophron and Peitholaus surrendered Pherae to Philip II of Macedon and fled with 2000 mercenaries to Phayllus, the Phocian leader. While in exile, Lycophron and Peitholaus supported Spartans in the Peloponnese, supplying them with 150 cavalry.
