= Tisiphonus of Pherae =

Tyrant of Pherae from 357 BC to 355/4 BC

Tisiphonus
- Tyrant of Pherae
- Reign: 357–355/54 BC
- Predecessor: Alexander of Pherae
- Successor: Lycophron & Peitholaus
- Father: Jason of Pherae

Tisiphonus (Ancient Greek: Τισίφονος), son of Jason of Pherae, was a tyrant of Pherae (357-355/4 BC) following the death of Alexander of Pherae.

Tisiphonus together with his two brothers, Lycophron and Peitholaus, murdered Alexander in his sleep. At first the brothers were celebrated for ridding the city of a tyrant, but later, with help of mercenaries, they established their own tyranny and slew many of their opponents.

Tisiphonus held the nominal title of a tyrant until at least 355 BC, since Xenophon mentions Tisiphonus as ruler of Pherae at the time of writing his narrative (Xenophon died in 354 BC). After that Tisiphonus disappears from history. When Diodorus Siculus mentions affairs of Pherae in 352 BC, he says that Lycophron and Peitholaus were tyrants.
