= Alexander of Lyncestis =

4th-century BC Greek general

Alexander (Greek: Αλέξανδρος) (d. 330 BC), son of Aeropus of Lyncestis, was a native of the upper Macedonian district called Lyncestis, whence he is usually called Alexander of Lynkestis or Alexander Lyncestes. Justin makes the singular mistake of calling him Alexander's brother, while in other passages he uses the correct expression.

== Background ==
Alexander was a contemporary of Philip III of Macedon and Alexander the Great. He had two brothers, Heromenes and Arrhabaeus; all three were under suspicion of involvement in the assassination of Philip II of Macedon, in 336 BC. Alexander the Great, on his accession, put to death all those who had taken part in the murder, and Alexander the Lyncestian was the only one who was pardoned, because he was the first who did homage to Alexander the Great as his king.

== Career ==
Moreover, King Alexander not only pardoned him, but even made him his friend and raised him to high honors. He was first entrusted with the command of an army in Thrace, and afterwards received the command of the Thessalian cavalry. In this capacity he accompanied Alexander on his eastern expedition. In 334, when Alexander was laying at Phaselis, he was informed that the Lyncestian was carrying on a secret correspondence with King Darius III of Persia, and that a large sum of money was promised, for which he was to murder Alexander. The bearer of the letters from Darius was taken by Parmenion and brought before Alexander, and the treachery was considered proven. Yet Alexander the Great, dreading to create any hostile feeling in Antipater, the regent of Macedonia, whose daughter was married to Alexander Lyncestes, thought advisable not to put him to death, and had him merely deposed from his office and kept in custody.

In this manner Alexander was dragged about for three years with the army in Asia, until in 330, when, Philotas having been executed for similar crime, the Macedonians, led by the arguments of Atarrhias, demanded that Alexander Lyncestes should likewise be tried and punished accordingly. Alexander the Great gave way, and as the traitor was unable to exculpate himself, he was put to death at Alexandria Prophthasia, the capital of Drangiana.

Alexander's likely motive originally, was to gain possession of the throne of Macedonia, which previous to the reign of Amyntas III of Macedon had for a time belonged to his family.

== See also ==
- Amyntas (son of Antiochus) – 4th-century BC Macedonian general
