= Battle of Lyncestis =

423 BCE battle, part of the Peloponnesian Wars

- Part of Peloponnesian Wars
Date	423 BC
Location	Lyncestis
Result	Lyncestian-Illyrian victory

Belligerents
Illyrians; Lynkestians	Sparta; Kingdom of Macedon

Commanders and leaders
Arrhabaios; Grabos I or Sirras	Brasidas; Perdikkas II

Strength
4,000 Illyrians	3,000 Greek hoplites 1,000 Macedonian and Chalcidian cavalry

The Battle of Lyncestis/Lyncus took place in 423 BC between the allied forces of the Lyncestians and Illyrians against those of the Spartans and Makedonians. The battle was part of the wider Peloponnesian Wars. Before Athens suffered defeat at Delium in 424 BC, Sparta had sent an expedition under Brasidas to assist Perdiccas II of Macedonia and other opponents of Athens. At first Sparta avoided involvement in Macedon's war with Arrhabaeus, but in 423 BC they joined an expedition which ended with retreat by the Macedonians and a brilliantly contrived escape of the Spartans.

After the initial joint Illyrian and Lyncestian attack was repulsed, they pursued the Macedonians and blocked Brasidas' route at a pass, forcing his army up the surrounding hill and into Macedonia. This brought to a head the quarrel between Brasidas and Perdiccas.

== Prelude ==
Arrhabaeus, the rebellious king of Lyncestis (also Lyncus), was subject to Perdiccas, whom Perdiccas at the time wanted to subordinate to Argead control. Much of what is known about the Macedonian kings before Alexander I relates to their struggles against Illyrian incursions. These Illyrian raids penetrated western Macedonia and threatened the Argead territory in the central plain. A century later the Illyrians continued to press their claim by joining Arrhabaeus. In 423 BC Sirras married the daughter of Arrhabaeus. Some claim that the Illyrians were under Sirras when the battle took place but this is not supported in historiography (Thucydides incidentally never makes any mention of Sirras). If the Illyrians were indeed under the rule of Sirras during the events of the battle, then they were either the Taulantii or Enchelii, depending on the affiliation of Sirras with either tribe and the exact location of his kingdom.

Perdiccas II was allied to the Spartans and, in 424 BC, helped the Spartan general, Brasidas, to take Amphipolis from the Athenians, one of her most important colonies, mainly for its ready access to timber for her fleets. This was a severe blow to Athens, and would tie them to Macedonian timber for years to come, which strengthened Macedonia’s bargaining power considerably. In return for this, and after initial reluctance, the Spartans helped Perdiccas secure his borders, by leading an assault on King Arrhabaeus, with the promise of support from the Illyrians.

== Battle - 423 BC ==
Brasidas and Perdiccas started on a second joint expedition into Lyncestis. Perdiccas was leading the forces of the Macedonians he ruled over and a body of hoplites. Brasidas had with him Chalcidians, Acanthians and such forces as the other allies could have contributed, in addition to the rest of the Peloponnesians in the area. In all three there were about 3,000 southern Greek hoplites, accompanied by all the (Northern Greek) Macedonian cavalry together with the Chalcidians, almost 1,000 strong, besides an immense number of barbarians.

On entering Lyncestis, Brasidas and Perdiccas found the Lyncestians encamped and waiting for them, so Brasidas and Perdiccas took up a position opposite. The infantry on either side were on hills, with a plain between them, into which the cavalry of both armies galloped down and engaged. After this, the Lyncestian hoplites advanced from their hill to join their cavalry and offered battle; in response to which Brasidas and Perdiccas also came down to meet them, and engaged and routed them with heavy loss; the survivors taking refuge upon the heights and there remaining disengaged. Brasidas and Perdiccas then waited two or three days for the Illyrian mercenaries who were to join Perdiccas. Perdiccas then wished to go on and attack the villages of Arrhabaeus, but Brasidas refused. He was anxious to return, as the Illyrians had not appeared, and he feared that the Athenians might sail up during his absence and attack Mende.

=== Illyrians ally with Arrhabaeus ===
In the meantime, the news arrived that the Illyrians had actually betrayed Perdiccas and allied instead with Arrhabaeus. The fear inspired by their warlike character made both parties now think it best to withdraw. However, owing to the disagreement between Brasidas and Perdiccas, nothing had been settled as to when they should retreat. During the night the Macedonians and their allies, believing that an army of Illyrians many times more numerous than that which had arrived was advancing, took fright. This compelled Perdiccas to flee in the direction of his homeland. At daybreak, Brasidas, seeing that the Macedonians had gone, and that the Illyrians and Arrhabaeus were on the point of attacking him, formed his hoplites into a square with the light troops in the centre, and prepared to retreat. Posting his youngest soldiers to dash out where ever the Illyrians and Lyncestians should attack them, Brasidas and 300 picked men went to the rear intending to face about during the retreat and to beat off the most forward of their assailants.

Meanwhile, before the Illyrians approached, Brasidas sought to sustain the courage of his soldiers, clearly shaken by the fearsome appearance of a new enemy:

The present enemy might terrify an inexperienced imagination; they are formidable in outward bulk; their loud yelling is unbearable; and the brandishing of their weapons in the air has a threatening appearance. But when it comes to real fighting with an opponent who stands his ground, they are not what they seemed; they have no regular order that they should be ashamed of deserting their positions when hard pressed; flight and attack are equally honourable with them, and afford no test of courage; their independent mode of fighting never leaving anyone who wants to run away without a fair excuse for doing so.

After this brief address, Brasidas began to lead off his army. Seeing this, the Illyrians and Lyncestians came on with much shouting and noise, thinking that he was fleeing and that they would overtake him and cut him off. But each time they charged they found the young men ready to dash out against them, while Brasidas with his picked company backed them up. Thus the Peloponnesians withstood the first attack, to the surprise of their enemy, and afterwards received and repulsed them as fast as they came on, retiring as soon as their enemy became quiet. The main body of the Illyrians and Lyncestians ceased to molest Brasidas and his troops once they were in open country, and left just a part of their forces behind to follow them and keep up the attacks. The rest made off at a run after the fleeing Macedonians, killing any they caught, and went on ahead to take control of the narrow pass that lay between two hills and led into Lyncestis, knowing that Brasidas had no other line of retreat. Therefore, as he approached the most difficult part of the route they began to encircle him to cut him off.

Realising what was happening, Brasidas gave orders to the 300 men to break ranks and each run as fast as he could to the nearest hill. He thought it easiest to capture and to try and dislodge the Illyrians and Lyncestians already there before the larger encircling group could join them. His men attacked and overpowered the party on the hill, enabling the main body of Peloponnesians to make their way to join them with relatively little difficulty.

=== Aftermath ===
Brasidas now that he had taken the high ground, went on in greater security to Arnisa, the first place he reached in Perdiccas’ state. His soldiers were furious at the premature retreat of the Macedonians, and whenever they came across any of their oxcarts or any baggage that had fallen off, they would cut loose and slaughter the oxen and take the baggage for themselves. It was from this point that Perdiccas started think of Brasidas as an enemy, and from then on he nursed a lasting hatred of the Peloponnesians.

== Historical sources ==
- Thucydides: The Peloponnesian War, book 4, chapter 124-126 (online copy at Perseus Project)
