= Aristomedes =

Aristomedes (Ancient Greek: Ἀριστομήδης) can refer to more than one person in ancient history:

- Aristomedes of Thebes, ancient Greek sculptor of the late 6th and early 5th centuries BCE
- Aristomedes of Pherae, a deserter from Alexander the Great in the 4th century BCE
