= Aeropus =

Aeropus may refer to:

- Aeropus, brother of Perdiccas I, who was the first king of Macedonia of the family of Temenus
- Aeropus I of Macedon, King of Macedon, 602–576 BC
- Aeropus II of Macedon, King of Macedon, 399–393 BC
- Aeropus of Lyncestis, commander of Philip II
- Aeropus, a son of Cepheus, King of Tegea, in Greek mythology
- Aeropus, in Greek mythology a kind of bird into which Botres was changed
- The Nemerçkë mountain range shared between Greece and Albania
