= Autobares =

Persian nobleman

Autobares (Greek: Αὐτοβάρης; (Note: The spelling "Aigobares" (Greek: Αἰγοβάρης) is a corruption.) from Old Persian Wata-para) was a Persian nobleman who flourished in the second half of the 4th century BC. He and his brother Mithrobaeus were enrolled into the Agema of the Hetairoi cavalry at Susa in 324 BC during the short-lived reign of Alexander the Great.
