= Aeropus of Lyncestis =

4th-century BC Macedonian commander

Aeropus (Greek: Ἀέροπος) of Lyncestis was a commander in the battle of Chaeronea. After the battle Philip II of Macedon exiled him and an officer called Damasippus for disciplinary reasons. He was father of Arrhabaeus and Heromenes, who were accused of being conspirators against Philip II and Alexander of Lyncestis, who was befriended by Alexander the Great but later also conspired against the Macedonian king.
