= Atarrhias =

Ancient Macedonian general

Atarrhias (Ancient Greek: Ἀταῤῥίας) (or Tarrhias according to Plutarch), son of Deinomenes, was a man of ancient Macedonia mentioned several times by the historian Quintus Curtius Rufus, with a slight variation in the orthography of the name, in the wars of Alexander the Great.

He was a hypaspist, and commanded other hypaspists, being described as the foremost hypaspist officer after Neoptolemus. He served with distinction at Halicarnassus. He was a leading voice in the argument to execute Alexander of Lyncestis.

He could have been the same Atarrhias as the one who was sent by Cassander with a part of the army to oppose Aeacides, king of Epirus, in 317 BCE.

He is described as a "rougher and tougher" sort of character than Alexander's other generals, and Alexander considered him undisciplined. We know that by the end of the Macedonian campaign he was heavily in debt, so much so that he attempted to defraud Alexander in a scheme involving veterans funds. Nothing further is known of him.
