= Treasury of the Acanthians =

The Treasury of the Acanthians at Delphi was built by the citizens of Acanthos on the Chalcidice peninsula in commemoration of their joint victory with the Lacedaemonians against the Athenians.

== Description ==
In 424 B.C., in the course of the Peloponnesian War, the Spartan general Brasidas managed to persuade Acanthos, an ally of Athens on the Chalcidice peninsula, to defect from their alliance. Then, the Acanthians sided with the Lacaedemonians and fought against Athens. From the booty of the battles, including the battle of Lyncestis, they built a treasury in the sanctuary of Apollo at Delphi, commemorating the joint victory. Plutarch in his "Life of Lysander" mentions the dedicatory inscription: Brasidas and the Acanthians from the Athenians. The commemoration of the name of Brasidas would have constituted an unusually great honour, if it was written while he was still alive. In the Classical period, it was not a common practice to write the name of leaders or individuals on such dedications, particularly if the latter constituted collective offerings of an entire "polis" to the god. It has been thus suggested that the Treasury of the Acanthians was built after Brasidas' death in 422 B.C. However, there are also opposing views, supporting that the mention of the name indicated that Brasidas was still alive when the building was erected.

Plutarch mentions that the statue which stood within the Treasury belonged to Lysander, despite the fact that many believed that it depicted Brasidas. Plutarch also mentions that in the treasury of the Acanthians stood a chryselephantine trireme, donated by Cyrus the Younger. Behind the treasury of the Acanthians in the Roman period a gate opened onto the sacred precinct, leading to the so-called "House of the Peristyle", dated to the 1st century A.D.
