= Hyperetes =

Ancient Greek title

Hyperetes (Ancient Greek: ὑπηρέτης; pl. hyperetai) was an Ancient Greek title. It is derived from ἐρέσσω (eresso), and therefore originally signifies a rower, but in later times the word was, with the exception of the soldiers or marines, applied to the whole body of persons who performed any service in a vessel. In a still wider sense it was applied to any person who acted as the assistant of another, and performed manual labour for him, whether in sacred or profane things. Consequently, the word is sometimes used as synonymous with slave. The name was sometimes given to those men by whom the hoplites were accompanied when they took the field, and who carried the luggage, the provisions, and the shield of the hoplites, although the more common name for this servant of the hoplites was skeuophoros.

At Athens it seems to have been applied to a whole class of officers. Aristotle (Politics vi. 5) divides all public offices into three classes, archai or magistracies, epimeleiai or administrations, and hyperesiai or services.

Cities and administrations had their own hyperetai in the Hellenistic world. In Jewish Greek texts the term hyperetes has the meaning of religious servant (deacon). Luke the Evangelist (Acts 13.5) described John Mark as a hyperetes of Paul and Barnabas in a synagogue, which may be equivalent to Jewish hazzan. Those who compiled and collected the words of Jesus are called hyperetai tou logou in Luke 1.2, "servants of Logos."
