= Amyntas (son of Antiochus) =

4th-century BC Macedonian general

Amyntas (Greek: Ἀμύντας), son of Antiochus, was a Macedonian general, fugitive and traitor. As officer of Philip II, he and Amyntas (son of Perdiccas) were awarded proxenies by the Oropians in Boeotia before 338 BC. After the death of Philip II, Amyntas fled from Macedonia. Arrian (p. 17, f.) ascribes his flight from Macedonia to his hatred and fear of Alexander the Great; the ground of these feelings is not stated, but Mitford (ch. 44. sect. 1) connects him with the plot of Pausanias of Orestis and the murder of Philip.

He took refuge in Ephesus under Persian protection; whence, however, after the battle of the Granicus, fearing the approach of Alexander, he escaped with the Greek mercenaries who garrisoned the place, and fled to the court of Darius III. In the winter of the same year, 333 BC, while Alexander was at Phaselis in Lycia, discovery was made of a plot against his life, in which Amyntas was implicated. He appears to have acted as the channel through whom Darius had been negotiating with Alexander of Lyncestis, and had promised to aid him in mounting the Macedonian throne on condition of assassinating Alexander. The design was discovered through the confession of Asisines, a Persian, whom Darius had despatched on a secret mission to the Lyncestian, and who was apprehended by Parmenion in Phrygia.

At the battle of Issus we hear again of Amyntas as a commander of Greek mercenaries in the Persian service and Plutarch and Arrian mention his advice vainly given to Darius shortly before, to await Alexander's approach in the large open plains to the westward of Cilicia.

On the defeat of the Persians at the battle of Issus, Amyntas fled with a large body of Greeks to Tripolis (region of Phoenicia) along with Aristomedes of Pherae and others. There he seized some ships, with which he passed over to Cyprus, and thence to Egypt, of the sovereignty of which—a double traitor—he designed to possess himself. The gates of Pelusium were opened to him on his pretending that he came with authority from Darius : thence he pressed on to Memphis, and being-joined by a large number of Egyptians, defeated in a battle the Persian garrison under Mazaces. But this victory made his troops overconfident and incautious, and, while they were dispersed for plunder, Mazaces sallied forth upon them, and Amyntas himself was killed with the greater part of his men.
