= Sirras =

Late-5th/early 4th-century Macedonian prince

- Reign: c. 423–393 BC
- Died: After 390
- Consort: Irra of Lyncestis
- Ancient Greek: Σίρρας

Sirras or Sirrhas (Ancient Greek: Σίρρας; d. 390 BC) was the son-in-law of the king of Lynkestis, Arrhabaeus (fl. 423–393 BC), having married his daughter Irra. He participated in an Illyrian-Lynkestian coalition's defeat of the attempted invasion of Lynkestis by the Macedonian king Archelaus. He may have been a Lynkestian prince-regent or an Illyrian chieftain, part of the Illyrian force in a previous and also successful Illyrian-Lynkestian coalition against Sparta and Macedon during the Peloponnesian War.

Sirras' daughter Eurydice married Amyntas III, king of Macedon; the youngest of their sons was Philip II of Macedon, father of Alexander the Great.

== Name ==
The origin of the name Sirras or Sirrhas is somewhat obscure. It has been suggested that the characteristic doubling of the r (Greek: ρ) and the ending in -as (-ας) are typical of Macedonian names. Historian Waldemar Heckel notes that the "name does not appear elsewhere in Upper Makedonia, nor does it repeat within the family", but others interpret the name as being Lynkestian and not attested in Illyria.

== Biography ==
=== Origin ===
Sirras' origin is disputed, scholars being mainly divided on whether he was Illyrian or Lynkestian. Some have theorized that his father was probably the Illyrian chieftain Grabos, while his mother was perhaps a native Macedonian.

The only evidence for Sirras' ethnicity in ancient literature is the description of his daughter Eurydice's ethnicity, expressly described as "Illyrian", and through her maternal grand-father Arrhabaeus as "Lynkestian" from the Doric Greek Bacchiadae family. Modern scholars are divided on whether they are historically accurate or not, or whether they are mutually exclusive or not.

=== Participation in the Peloponnesian War ===
Although not mentioned in ancient historiography, Sirras was possibly the Illyrian chieftain during the Peloponnesian War taking the side of Athens, as an ally of the Lynkestian king Arrhabaeus against Perdiccas II of Macedon. The marriage between Sirras and the daughter of the Lynkestian king Arrhabaeus in c. 430–420 BC is regarded to have been a political marriage to strengthen the Illyrian-Lynkestian alliance, in order to counterbalance the power of the Macedonian king Perdiccas.

At first Sparta avoided involvement in Macedon's war with Arrhabaeus, but in 423 BC they joined an expedition which ended with a retreat by the Macedonians and a brilliantly contrived escape of the Spartans. After an initial success against Arrhabaeus, Perdiccas persuaded his allies to await the arrival of Illyrian mercenaries. Rather the Illyrians opted instead to join the army of Arrhabaeus as they were now allies. The Spartan general, Brasidas who came to support the Macedonians in their advance into the remote regions of Lyncestis, was abandoned by the Macedonians but was able to extract his army of 4,000 from Illyrian encirclement. Thucydides stated that the fear inspired by their warlike character made both Greek armies think it best to retreat. The young Spartans were clearly shaken by the fearsome appearance of the Illyrian forces.

Thucydides reports Brasidas saying that the Illyrians may terrify those with an active imagination, they are formidable in their outward bulk, their loud yelling is unbearable and the brandishing of their weapons in the air has a threatening appearance, but when it comes to real fighting with an opponent who stands his ground they are not what they seemed; they have no regular order that would make them ashamed of deserting their positions when hard pressed; with them flight and attack are equally honourable, and afford no test of courage; their independent mode of fighting never leaving anyone who wants to run away without a fair excuse of doing so.

Besides Brasidas' forces, Perdiccas' faction was supported by Chalcidians, however the campaign against the Illyrian-Lynkestian coalition was a disaster because of Macedonian incompetence, resulting in the end of Brasidas' alliance with Perdiccas. A pacification between Arrhabaeus and Perdiccas was started by Athenians. Perdiccas was interested in peace with Lynkestis due to his recent defeat in the Lynkestian campaign, the Illyrian-Lynkestian collaboration, and his new enmity with Brasidas. On the other hand, Arrhabaeus was interested in peace with the Argeads to avert future invasions of his realm by Macedon.

=== War against Archelaus I of Macedon ===
In 413 Perdiccas's son Archelaus obtained the throne of Macedon, and he evidently continued his father's conflict against the Lynkestians, probably involving Illyrians. The Macedonian king undertook a war against the Lynkestian Arrhabaeus and his ally Sirras. Seeking help from the king of Elimeia, the marriage of Archelaus' eldest daughter with the king of Elimeia ensured a solid Upper Macedonian ally for Archelaus' war against Arrhabaeus and Sirras. Additionally, Archelaus made general ameliorations to the military and reinforced the borders of his kingdom, which apparently held the Illyrians momentarily at bay.

== Family ==
Sirras' daughter, Eurydice, married King Amyntas III of Macedon in around 390 BC, probably in a Macedonian effort to establish an alliance with both the Illyrians and Lynkestians, or to detach the Lynkestians from their historical alliance with the Illyrians, after Amyntas was defeated by Illyrians or an Illyrian-Lynkestian coalition in 393 BC. One of the sons from this marriage was the future Philip II of Macedon.

== Bibliography ==
- Carney, Elizabeth D. (2019). Eurydice and the Birth of Macedonian Power. Oxford University Press. ISBN 978-0-19-028054-3.
- Chrystal, Paul (2017). Women at War in the Classical World. Pen and Sword Books Ltd. ISBN 978-1-47385-660-8.
- Carney, Elizabeth D.; Müller, Sabine (2020). The Routledge Companion to Women and Monarchy in the Ancient Mediterranean World. Routledge. ISBN 9780429783982.
- Chrystal, Paul (15 May 2016). In Bed with the Ancient Greeks. Amberley Publishing Limited. pp. 133–. ISBN 978-1-4456-5413-3.
- Greenwalt, William S. (2011). "Macedonia, Illyria and Epirus". In Roisman, Joseph; Worthington, Ian (eds.). A Companion to Ancient Macedonia. John Wiley & Sons. pp. 279–305. ISBN 978-1-4443-5163-7.
- Hatzopoulos, M. B. (2020). Ancient Macedonia. Walter de Gruyter GmbH & Co KG. ISBN 978-3-11-071868-3.
- Hammond, Nicholas Geoffrey Lemprière (1989). The Macedonian State: Origins, Institutions, and History. Oxford: Clarendon Press. ISBN 0-19-814883-6.
- Heckel, Waldemar (2016). Alexander's Marshals: A Study of the Makedonian Aristocracy and the Politics of Military Leadership. Routledge. ISBN 978-1317389224.
- Heckel, Waldemar; Heinrichs, Johannes; Müller, Sabine, eds. (2020). Lexicon of Argead Makedonia. Frank & Timme GmbH. ISBN 978-3732904051.
- Howe, T. (2017). "Plain tales from the hills: Illyrian influences on Argead military development". In Müller, S.; Howe, Tim; Bowden, H.; Rollinger, R. (eds.). The History of the Argeads: New Perspectives. Wiesbaden. ISBN 978-3447108515.
- Kapetanopoulos, Elias (1994). "Sirras" (PDF). The Ancient World. XXV (1). Archived from the original (PDF) on 2020-10-21.
- King, Carol (2017). Ancient Macedonia. Routledge. ISBN 978-1351710329.
- King, Karol J. (2024). "Macedonia". In Ogden, Daniel (ed.). The Cambridge Companion to Alexander the Great. Cambridge University Press. pp. 147–164. ISBN 9781108887427.
- Lane Fox, Robin J. (22 June 2011). Brill's Companion to Ancient Macedon: Studies in the Archaeology and History of Macedon, 650 BC - 300 AD. BRILL. pp. 221–. ISBN 978-90-04-20923-7.
- Müller, Sabine (2017a). Die Argeaden: Geschichte Makedoniens bis zum Zeitalter Alexanders des Großen. Verlag Ferdinand Schöningh. ISBN 978-3657777686.
- Müller, Sabine (2017b). Perdikkas II. – Retter Makedoniens. Altertumswissenschaften, Archäologie (in German). Vol. 6. Frank & Timme GmbH. ISBN 9783732902088.
- Müller, Sabine (2021). "Political Marriage in Antiquity". In Mohammed, Jowan A.; Jacob, Frank (eds.). Marriage Discourses: Historical and Literary Perspectives on Gender Inequality and Patriarchic Exploitation. Walter de Gruyter GmbH & Co KG. pp. 25–50. ISBN 9783110751451.
- Ogden, Daniel J. (2023). "Argead Macedon". Polygamy, Prostitutes and Death: The Hellenistic Dynasties. Classical Press of Wales. pp. 3–40. ISBN 9781108887427.
- Palairet, Michael (2016). Macedonia: A Voyage through History. Vol. 1, (From Ancient Times to the Ottoman Invasions). Cambridge Scholars Publishing. ISBN 9781443888431.
- Psoma, S. (2011). "The Kingdom of Macedonia and the Chalcidic League". In Lane Fox, R. (ed.). Brill's Companion to Ancient Macedon: Studies in the Archaeology and History of Macedon, 650 BC – 300 AD. Leiden: Brill. pp. 113–136. ISBN 978-90-04-20650-2.
- Roisman, Joseph (2011). "Classical Macedonia to Perdiccas II". In Roisman, Joseph; Worthington, Ian (eds.). A Companion to Ancient Macedonia. John Wiley & Sons. pp. 145–165. ISBN 978-1-4443-5163-7.
- Rowson, Alex (2022). The young Alexander: the making of Alexander the Great. William Collins. p. 491. ISBN 9780008284398.
- Šašel Kos, Marjeta (2002). "Pyrrhus and Illyrian Kingdom(s?)". Greek Influence Along the East Adriatic Coast. Knjiga Mediterana. 26: 101–119. ISBN 9531631549.
- Whitehorne, John (2002). Cleopatras. Routledge. ISBN 1134932154.
- Worthington, Ian (2008). Philip II of Macedonia. Yale University Press. ISBN 9780300120790.
