= Grabos I =

5th-century BC Illyrian chieftain

- King

King of Taulantia
- Reign: 437–423 BC
- Predecessor: unknown
- Successor: (?) Sirras
- Ancient Greek: Γράβος

Grabos (or Grabus; Ancient Greek: Γράβος; ruled c. 437–423 BC) was an Illyrian chieftain who is mentioned once in an Athenian inscription in 423 BC. He or his son (possibly Sirras) were the leaders of the Illyrians who supported the Lyncestians against an expedition by the Macedonians in 423 BC. The Illyrian-Lyncestian troops defeated the Macedonian-Spartan alliance.

He probably was the grandfather of Grabos II.

== See also ==
- Illyria
- List of Illyrians
- Illyrian kingdom

== Sources ==
- Heckel, Waldemar (2016). Alexander's Marshals: A Study of the Makedonian Aristocracy and the Politics of Military Leadership. Routledge. ISBN 1317389220.
