= Amyntas of Lyncestis =

Amyntas of Lyncestis or Amyntas Lyncestes (Ancient Greek: Ἀμύντας) was a taxiarch of Alexander the Great. He finished sixth in the competition in Sittacene, and was appointed chiliarch or pentacosiarch of the hypaspists.
