= Aristomedes of Thebes =

Ancient Greek sculptor

Aristomedes (Ancient Greek: Ἀριστομήδης) was a sculptor of ancient Greece, a native of Thebes, and a contemporary of Pindar. In conjunction with his neighbor, a man named Socrates, he made a statue of Cybele, which was dedicated by Pindar in the temple of that goddess, near Thebes.
