= Botres =

Greek mythological figure

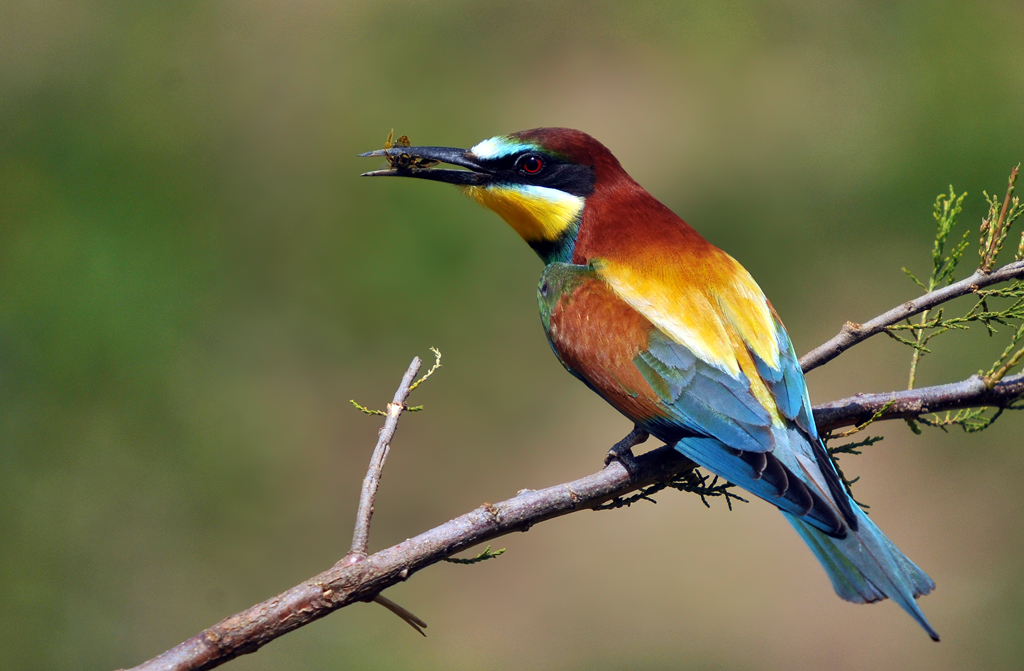
Aeropus (bee-eater)

In Greek mythology, Botres (Ancient Greek: Βότρης, romanized: Bótrēs) was a Theban son of Eumelus and grandson of Eugnotus.

== Mythology ==
Eumelus venerated the god Apollo devotedly and honored him with generous offerings. One day, when Eumelus was sacrificing a ram to the god, Botres, who was helping around, tasted the victim's brain before the ritual was completed. Eumelus, enraged, hit Botres on the head with a brand and inflicted a fatal injury on him. As it became evident that Botres was dying, Eumelus, his wife and the servants were overcome with sorrow. Being that Eumelus was a devotee, Apollo took pity on them and changed Botres into a bird called Aeropus (bee-eater).

This myth is also briefly referenced in Ovid's Metamorphoses.
