= Hypaspists =

Ancient Macedonian military unit also known as a shield-bearer

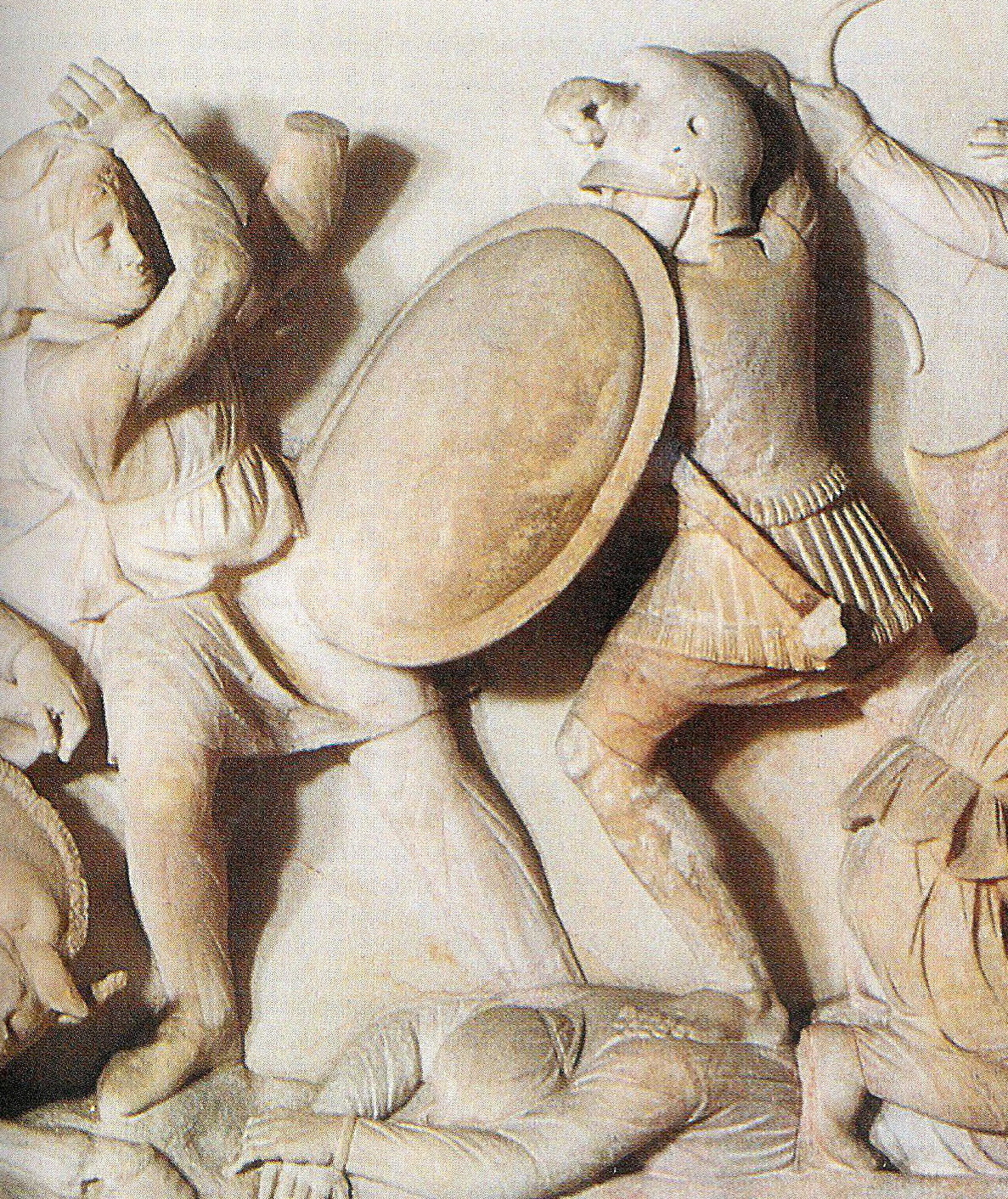
Ancient depiction of a Macedonian infantryman (right). He is equipped with an Argive shield, so probably is a Hypaspist. He also wears a linothorax cuirass and a Thracian helmet. Alexander Sarcophagus.

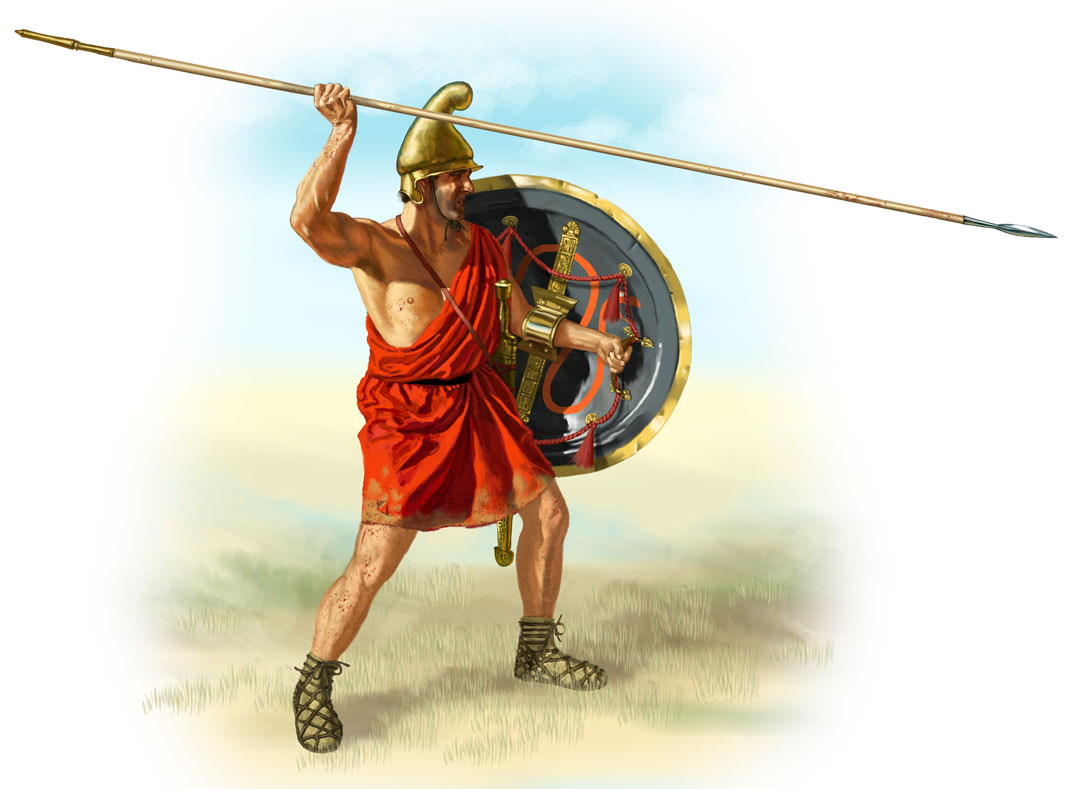
A Hypaspist

A hypaspist (Greek: Ὑπασπιστής "shield bearer" or "shield covered") is a squire, man at arms, or "shield carrier". In Homer's Iliad, Deiphobos advances "ὑπασπίδια" (hypaspídia) or under cover of his shield. By the time of Herodotus (426 BC), the word had come to mean a high status soldier as is strongly suggested by Herodotus in one of the earliest known uses:

Now the horse which Artybius rode was trained to fight with infantrymen by rearing up. Hearing this, Onesilus said to his hypaspist, a Carian of great renown in war and a valiant man ...

A similar usage occurs in Euripides's play Rhesus and another in his Phoenissae. Xenophon was deserted by his hypaspist in a particularly sticky situation. A hypaspist would differ from a skeuophoros in most cases because the "shield bearer" is a free warrior and the "baggage carrier" was a servant.

== Macedonian hypaspists ==
The word may have had Homeric and heroic connotations that led Philip II of Macedon to use it for an elite military unit. This unit, known as the Hypaspistai, or hypaspists, was probably armed in the hoplite manner, with a large concave shield (Aspis) and a spear (Dory), in addition to spolas or linothorax body-armor, hoplite's helmet, greaves and a xiphos or kopis sword (though their equipment was likely more ornate than main-line soldiers).

In contrast, the main Macedonian Phalanx consisted of the pikemen known as phalangites. These men were armed with the Sarissa, a pike of between 4 and 6.7m, a small flat shield and a shortsword called a Xiphos as a secondary weapon. The divergence in equipment and tactics between the traditional Greek Hoplite phalanx and the Macedonian Phalanx is attributed to Philip II of Macedon, the father of Alexander the Great.

In set piece battles, the Macedonian Hypaspists were positioned on the flanks of the phalangite's phalanx; in turn, their own flanks were protected by light infantry and cavalry. Their job was to guard the flanks of the large and unwieldy pike phalanx. The armored Phalangites with their sarissas were not particularly agile or able to turn quickly, so hypaspists would prevent attacks on the vulnerable sides of the formation. Their role was vital to the success of Philip's tactics because the Macedonian phalanx was all but invulnerable from the front, and was, with five layers of iron spikes moving in unison, used as the anvil in a hammer and anvil tactic, where the Companion cavalry was the hammer that smashed the enemy against an anvil of thousands of iron spikes. As such an important yet vulnerable part of the Macedonian army, it needed protection for its main vulnerability, the flanks. The protection/remedy for this vulnerability was the Hypaspists, who were able to conduct maneuvers and use tactics, which, owing to their hoplite panoply of weapons and armor, would have been impossible (or at least much less effective) if performed by the phalangites.

All the references to a unit called "Hypaspists" are much later than the period of Philip, and modern historians have to assume that later sources, like Diodorus Siculus (1st century BC) and Arrian, had access to earlier records.

Arrian's phrase tous kouphotatous te kai ama euoplotatous) has frequently been rendered as 'lightest armed', although Brunt concedes it is more properly translated as 'nimblest' or 'most agile'.

There has been a great deal of speculation by military historians ever since the late Hellenistic period about the elite units of Philip's army. The hypaspists may have been raised from the whole kingdom rather than on a cantonal basis; if so, they were the king's army rather than the army of the kingdom.

In the Hellenistic period, hypaspists apparently continued to exist, albeit in different capacities and under different names, like Agema. The name lived on in the Seleucid (agema of the hypaspists), Ptolemaic and Antigonid kingdoms, and they were now seen as royal bodyguards and elite infantry as well as military administrators. Polybius mentions a hypaspist being sent by Philip V of Macedon, after his defeat at the Battle of Cynoscephalae in 197 BC, to Larissa to burn state papers.

The actual fighting unit of hypaspists seems to have lived on in Macedon as the corps of Antigonid peltasts, whose status, equipment and role seems to have been almost exactly the same as that of the hypaspist under Philip. Originally consisting of 3,000 men, by the Third Macedonian War there were 5,000, most likely to accommodate their elite formation, the Agema.

== See also ==
- Skeuophoros
- Amyntas of Lyncestis
