= Aristomedes of Pherae =

4th-century BC Greek soldier and mercenary

Aristomedes (Ancient Greek: Ἀριστομήδης) of Pherae was a soldier of ancient Greece who deserted or defected from the army of Philip II of Macedon to the side of the Persians some time around 341 or 340 BCE. It is not known what his grievance was. Scholar John R. Ellis speculates he was part of a coalition inside Macedonia seeking foreign support to overthrow the dynasty of Philip II of Macedon and replace the ruling dynasty with the family of one of the coalition members -- Amyntas son of Antiochus -- who came from high birth.

First-century BCE scholar Didymus Chalcenterus claimed that he had seen a text of a letter of Philip II of Macedon complaining about Aristomedes, seeming to refer to the (spurious) "Letter from Philip to the Athenians" present in some of the corpus of Demosthenes, however this does not match the text of any of the letters of Philip we have.

He is next heard from leading 8000 Greek mercenaries against Alexander for Darius III during the Battle of Issus, alongside Bianor the Akarnanian, Amyntas son of Antiochus, and Thymondas son of Mentor -- all of whom were deserters from the Macedonian side. All four of these generals fled very early in the action during an attack from Alexander. First, after torching all other boats that could pursue them, they launched in boats to Tripolis, thence to Cyprus and ultimately Egypt.
