= Agema =

Greek term for a special military detachment

Agema (Greek: ἄγημα), plural agemata (αγήματα) is a term to describe a military detachment, used for a special purpose, such as guarding high valued targets. Due to its nature the agema most probably comprises elite troops.

== Etymology ==
The word derives from the Greek verb ago (Greek: ἄγω, lit. 'to route', 'to drive'). It can literally mean a pack, a routing party and/or a detachment that has a single commander.

== Macedonian army ==
In ancient Macedonia, the royal squadron of the Companion cavalry formed the mounted agema, and was usually led in person by the king. The senior chiliarchy (χιλιαρχία) of the hypaspists and asthetairoi, and later argyraspids (silver shields) formed the foot agema. In the eastern Diadochi states (the Seleucid Empire, Ptolemaic Egypt, the Kingdom of Bactria) they were the infantry guards of the king. The eastern agema guards wore bronze plate, Phrygian helmet (or Thracian) helmet and aspis shield, and carried a sarissa and short sword.

=== The agema in the Antigonid army ===
In Macedonia, especially under Philip V of Macedon and Perseus of Macedon, the agema formed an elite body within the corps of Antigonid peltasts. This corps is not to be confused with the light infantry. The Macedonian peltast corps was the equivalent of the hypaspists in Alexander the Great's army. The agema, as well as the peltasts, according to Duncan Head, would fight in pitched battle as a conventional phalanx. Yet they may have used lighter equipment for forced marches.

=== The agema in the Seleucid army ===
The agema had a full name, the agema of the hypaspists. The absence of mention of them in detailed writings about the Seleucid campaigns may be due to their having retained only the second half of their name, being called the hypaspists. They formed a crack force within the infantry guardsmen corps. There were 1000 argyraspides of the royal guard at the right flank led by the king at the Battle of Magnesia in 190 BC.

The agema in the Seleucid army was also elite corps of cavalry that would escort the king into battle or be placed under direct command and combined with the Companions to escort the king.

They were recruited from the Medes and their neighbors.

=== The agema in the Ptolemaic army ===
At the battle of Raphia, the Ptolemaic forces included 3,000 Hypaspists under Eurylochus the Magnesian (the foot Agema).

== Modern use ==
In modern Greece's Hellenic Army, the term agema denotes an honorary guard detachment, such as at the hoisting of the Greek flag or in national and religious feasts. The name was applied for a short time to the Royal Guard, following its establishment in December 1868.
