= Skeuophoros =

Slave or servant who carried baggage in ancient Greece

A skeuophoros (Greek: Σκευοφόρος "Βaggage carrier") was a slave or servant who carried baggage in ancient Greece. Herodotus records that every hoplite was followed on campaign by a servant as a skeuophoros. In Aristophanes' play The Frogs, Xanthias, the slave of Dionysus, acts as his skeuophoros:

Διόνυσος ἴθι νυν ἐπειδὴ ληματίας κἀνδρεῖος εἶ,
σὺ μὲν γενοῦ 'γὼ τὸ ῥόπαλον τουτὶ λαβὼν
καὶ τὴν λεοντῆν, εἴπερ ἀφοβόσπλαγχνος εἶ:
ἐγὼ δ᾽ ἔσομαί σοι σκευοφόρος ἐν τῷ μέρει.
