= Pausanias of Orestis =

Assassin of Philip II of Macedon

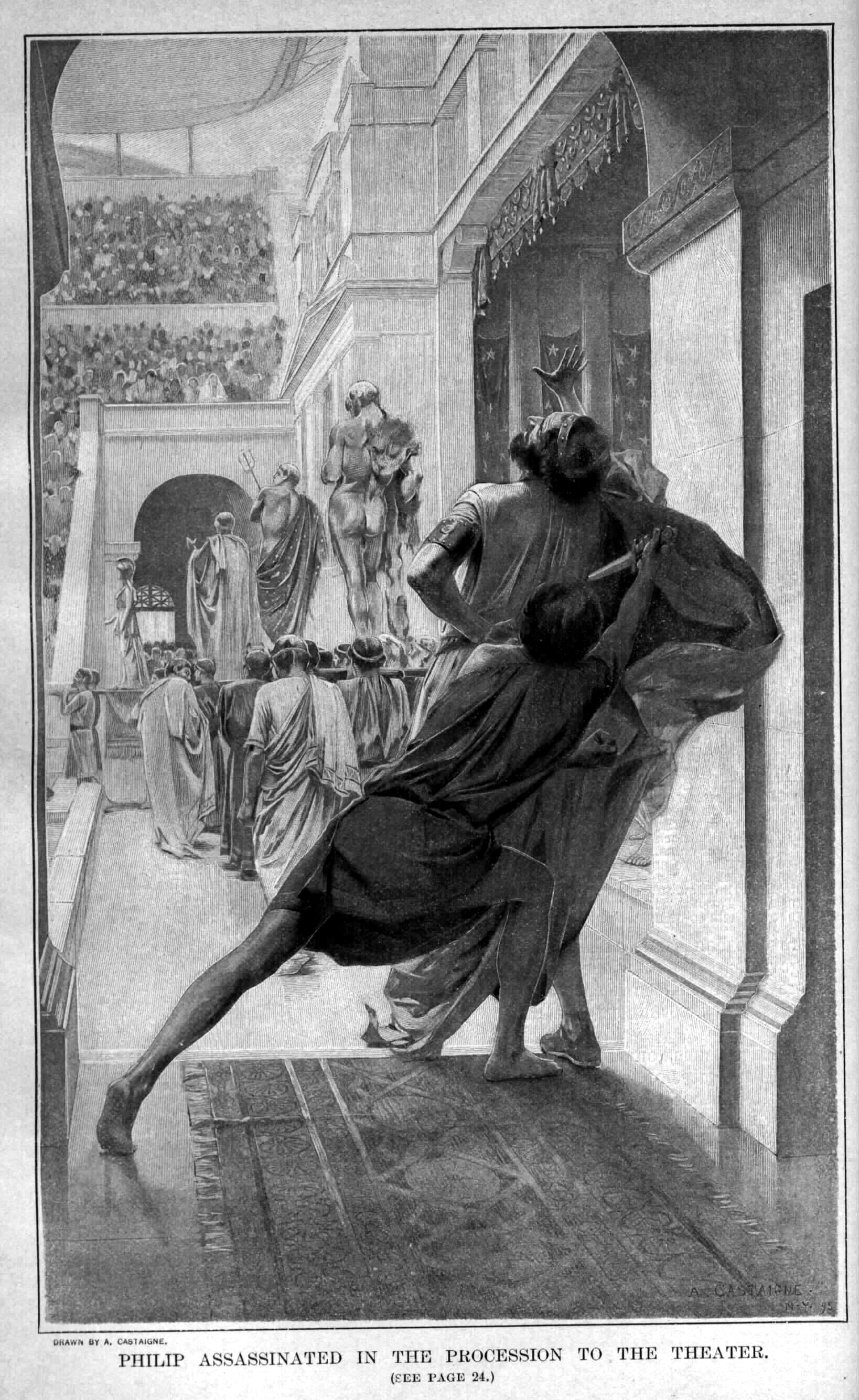
Drawing of Philip II's assassination by artist André Castaigne (c. 1898)

Pausanias of Orestis (Ancient Greek: Παυσανίας ἐκ τῆς Ὀρεστίδος) was a member of Philip II of Macedon's personal bodyguard (somatophylakes). He assassinated Philip in 336 BC. Pausanias was killed while fleeing the assassination.

== Family background ==
"About this time it was that Philip, king of Macedon, was treacherously assaulted and slain at Aegae by Pausanias, the son of Cerastes, who was derived from the family of Orestae".

== Motive as an assassin ==
The first historical record of the assassination comes from Aristotle, a contemporary of Philip's. He only gives a brief mention of the events, not delving into details about which specific affront Pausanias was exacting revenge for. Fifty years later, Cleitarchus expanded and embellished the story and centuries later Diodorus Siculus would in turn reiterate this account in his Bibliotheca Historica.

According to Diodorus, Pausanias of Orestis, a former lover of Philip's, was angered when the king turned his attention to a younger man, confusingly also named Pausanias. Feeling spurned he publicly insulted his romantic rival, prompting the latter Pausanias to prove his honor by risking his life in battle to protect the king and ultimately dying as a result. The general Attalus, a friend of the slain Pausanias, to whom he had previously confided what he intended to do, was angered by his friend's death and sought to exact revenge. He supposedly invited Pausanias of Orestis to dinner and after getting him drunk, he handed his nearly unconscious body to his servants and had them rape him.

Philip II reportedly did not punish Attalus for raping his former lover, possibly for political reasons (Attalus was a prominent nobleman and general, whom Philip trusted to lead his advance army against the Persians). Instead, Pausanias of Orestis was promoted to the rank of somatophylax (royal bodyguard), which may have been intended as compensation. It was this refusal to punish Attalus which, according to Diodorus, prompted Pausanias to murder Philip.

=== Problems with timing of the revenge ===
In spite of these claims, there is a problem with the delay between the rape and the revenge: Diodorus supports the attribution of a personal motive to Pausanias, but dates the events that led to the assault on Pausanias to the time of the Illyrian Pleurias, but the last known campaign Philip conducted against the Illyria took place in 344 BC. The correspondence between these dates would put eight years between Pausanias' rape and the murder of Philip – a long wait for an ostensibly hot-blooded act of personal revenge.

== Killed while fleeing and trial of co-conspirators ==
Pausanias killed Philip at the wedding ceremony of Philip's daughter Cleopatra to Alexander I of Epirus; however, in the aftermath of the murder, whilst fleeing to the city gate in order to try to make his escape, Pausanias tripped on a vine root and was speared to death by several of Philip's bodyguards, including Attalus, son of Andromenes the Stymphaean, Leonnatus, and Perdiccas, who were also bodyguards and friends of Alexander.

The murder was certainly premeditated, as horses were found near where Pausanias had tried to flee. At the murder trial, two other men, Heromenes and Arrhabaeus, were found guilty of conspiring with Pausanias, and executed. Leonnatus, who threw the spear that killed Pausanias, was demoted, possibly under the suspicion that he was trying to prevent the assassin from being interrogated.

== See also ==
- Amyntas (son of Antiochus)

== Sources ==
=== Ancient ===
- Plutarch: Life of Alexander
  - "Philip's Assassination", Plutarch
- Diodorus Siculus, 16.94

=== Modern ===
- "Death of Philip: Murder or Assassination?"
- Alexander The Great, J. R. Hamilton
- Alexander Of Macedon 356-323 B.C., Peter Green
