= Arrhabaeus =

Arrhabaeus (Greek: Ἀρραβαῖος) or Arrhibaeus may refer to:

- Arrhabaeus, the king of Lynkestis, who claimed Corinthian aristocratic (Bacchiadae) origin. He was the maternal grandfather of Eurydice I of Macedon, mother of Phillip II. Arrhabaeus revolted against his sovereign, king Perdiccas II of Macedon in 424 BC. Brasidas the Spartan helped Perdiccas against Arrhabaeus.
- Arrhabaeus, son of Aeropus of Lyncestis, a conspirator against Philip II of Macedon. He was executed, along with his brother Heromenes. His son Amyntas served as cavalry officer of Alexander the Great.
- Arrhabaeus, a nobleman from Pelagonia, the father of Menelaus of Pelagonia.
